= Hendrik Conscience Heritage Library =

Repository library of Antwerp, Belgium

Coordinates: 51.2208°N 4.4039°E

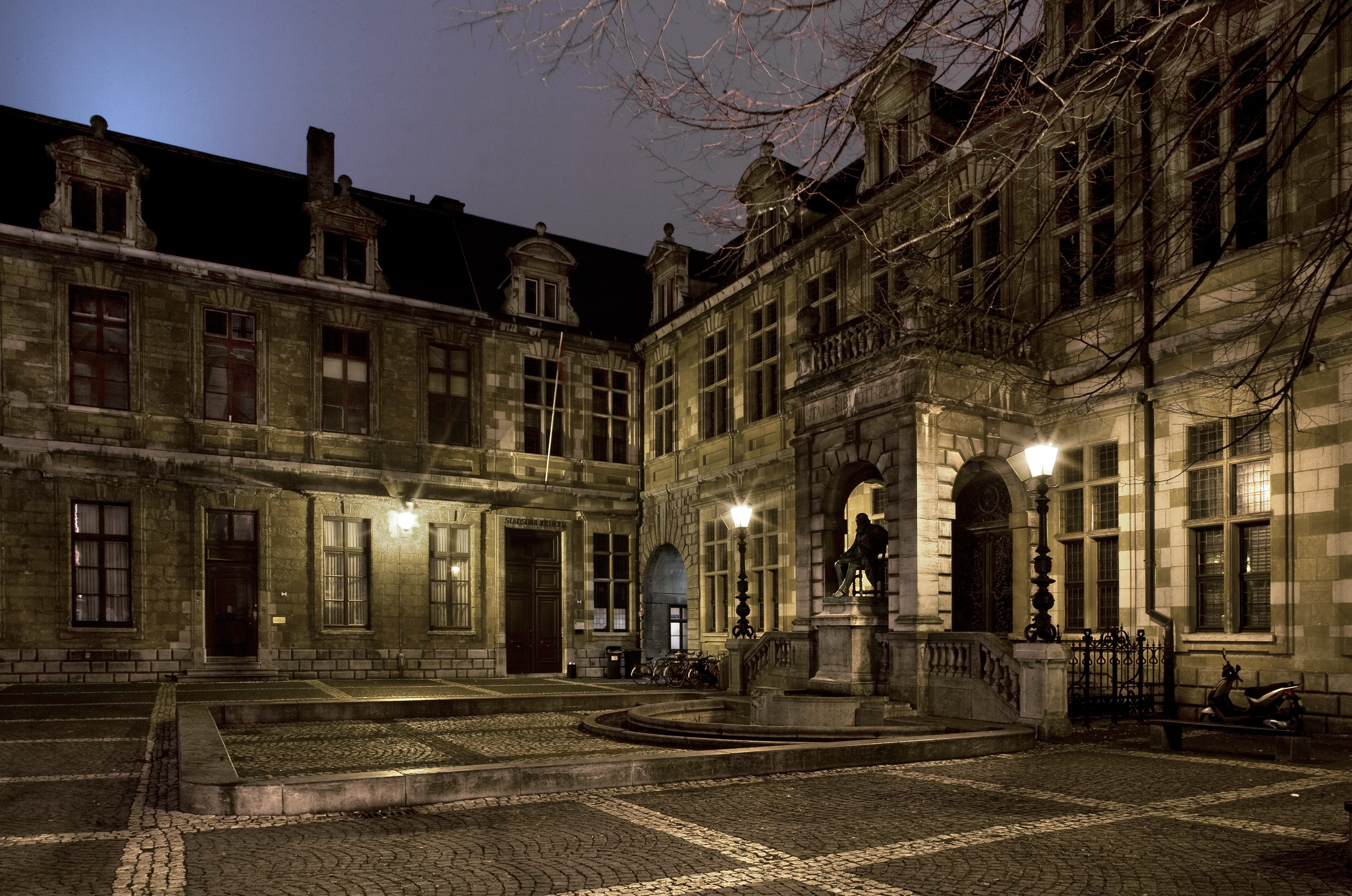
Hendrik Conscience Square

The Hendrik Conscience Heritage Library (Dutch: Erfgoedbibliotheek Hendrik Conscience) is the repository library of the city of Antwerp. It is named after the Flemish writer Hendrik Conscience, whose statue adorns the library. The library conserves books and magazines to keep them available permanently.

The history of the Hendrik Conscience Heritage Library, which was called the City Library until 2008, goes back to 1481. The collection contains more than one million books. The primary collection areas are Dutch literature, history of the Netherlands, early printed books (pre-1830), Flemish folk culture, art in the Netherlands, and works about Antwerp ("Antverpiensia").

== History ==
The library originated in the fifteenth century, Over the centuries, the collection grew steadily. In the nineteenth century, the library expanded significantly. Today the Hendrik Conscience Heritage Library possesses a vast and versatile collection.

=== Ancien regime ===
In 1481, city secretary Willem Pauwels donated his collection of 41 books to the City of Antwerp. In 1505, the collection was placed in Antwerp City Hall. This original collection was lost in 1576, when the city hall caught fire during the Spanish Fury, when mutinous Spanish troops plundered the city.

The city soon decided to rebuild the library. Christopher Plantin and his successors donated a copy of each book they printed, including the Biblia Polyglotta and Opticorum libri VI of Francis Aguilonius. In 1594, the new library was again housed in the city hall, but this time in the former room of the militia, the Camer van de Librarye.

In 1604, Bishop Joannes Miraeus founded the Antwerp seminary, which was responsible for the education of the secular clergy. There soon was a need for a private library, so Miraeus appointed his erudite nephew Aubertus Miraeus as the librarian. Aubertus created an expansive humanist collection, thanks to donations of scholars, wealthy citizens and book printers. In 1609 the chapter started negotiations with the city council to merge the two libraries. Aubertus Miraeus made an inventory of the chapter library and published it as Bibliothecae Antverpianae Primordia. He mentions 356 works, including 32 manuscripts. In 1617, the two libraries merged. The resulting collection was housed in the seminary.

After the Treaty of Munster and the blocking of the river Scheldt, space became available in the Trade House because of the economic crisis. The city council decided to store the library collection in this building. For the following thirty years, the library was neglected. In 1677 city secretary Andries Van Valckenisse made a new inventory. The books moved to the "pest room" in the city hall in 1687. In this room, the magistrate and city doctors tried to make a prevention plan against epidemics.

=== French period ===
During the 18th century, the City Library was just like the rest of Antwerp victim of a general malaise. In 1795, this changed when the French occupiers founded the Ecole Centrale in Antwerp, which had a library that consisted of works from abolished monasteries. The Ecole Centrale closed in 1802 already. Many books were returned to the original owners, but other works became part of the City Library. In 1805, the library opened for the public.

=== Nineteenth century ===
The City Library's heyday was in the nineteenth century. Librarians Frans Henry Mertens and Constant Jacob Hansen developed the collection substantively and built the structure of the library as it stands today.

Mertens was appointed as a librarian in 1834. He created a new book order and published a printed catalog. He started the impressive collection of Dutch literature on which the library still focuses. In his last years, he helped to develop the People's Library, which was later called the Public Library. In 1865 the city of Antwerp opted for two types of libraries: a People' Library (Dutch: Volksboekerij) with contemporary books on loan and a City Library for permanent conservation of publications on the other.

The constant growth of both the City Library and the People' Library lead to a lack of space at city hall. Therefore, the city of Antwerp bought the 17th century former Jesuit Sodality house, located on the Western side of the Jezuiëtenplein, nest to the professed house and opposite the Carolus Borromeuskerk . After a thorough renovation approximately 43,000 volumes of the former City Library along with the 20,000 works of the People's Library were transferred to the new premises in 1883. On the day of the official opening, the statue of Hendrik Conscience was ceremoniously unveiled. The Jezuiëtenplein was renamed Hendrik Conscienceplein. However, the lack of space remained a major problem, and in 1895, the People's Library moved to a new location.

=== Twentieth century ===
When in 1905 the heirs of Gustave Havre wanted to sell his impressive book collection at an auction in Amsterdam, the head librarian French Gittens and Maximum Rooses, curator of the library of the Plantin-Moretus Museum, asked the City Council, the press and several patrons to buy the collection. Thanks to an Endowment Fund a quarter of the collection could be purchased. Today the collection of Havre is still an important part of the library books. The Endowment Fund still exists. It is now called the Dotatiefonds voor Boek en Letteren and it is a regular sponsor for significant acquisitions.

The City Library kept struggling with a lack of space. In 1930 and 1990, thorough renewal and extension works were performed. Each time, the infrastructure was optimized for the comfort of the visitor and for the preservation of a growing, valuable collection.

In 1980 the Public Library and the City Library were separated.

At the turn of the century, the City Library had become one of the main reference libraries in Flanders. It now had an online catalogue of the entire collection. The library's main focus remained on the humanities in general and Flemish cultural heritage in particular. In 2008 the official name was changed: the City Library of Antwerp was renamed as the Erfgoedbibliotheek Hendrik Conscience (Hendrik Conscience Heritage Library).

== Building ==
=== Sodality ===
The history of the Sodality, the impressive building on the Hendrik Conscienceplein, dates from the seventeenth century. After the Carolus Borromeuskerk was built in 1621, the Jesuits founded different fraternities, called sodalities. For these sodalities, a two-storey building was erected opposite the church. After the dissolution of the Jesuit order in 1773, the building was used for all sorts of activities, including as a bar and as a ballroom. On the wall at the Wijngaardstraat you can still read the old name "Café Moortgat".

In 1879 the City of Antwerp bought the building, which was still called the Sodality, to accommodate the City Library. The city council renovated the building drastically. On 13 August 1883, the new library building opened and the bronze statue of Hendrik Conscience at the entrance was revealed. The building then offered shelter to both the City Library and the People's Library, which was reached through a separate entrance on the corner of Wijngaardstraat. After several years, the Sodality became too small for the growing library collections and in 1895, the People's Library moved to Blinde Straat.

The City Library could now use the entire space of the Sodality, but after some time it was necessary to expand even further, towards the old Jesuit convent. In this convent, the reading room, offices and three floors of stacks opened in 1936. In the Sodality, two additional floors of stacks were realized, plus the Nottebohmzaal.

=== Nottebohmzaal ===
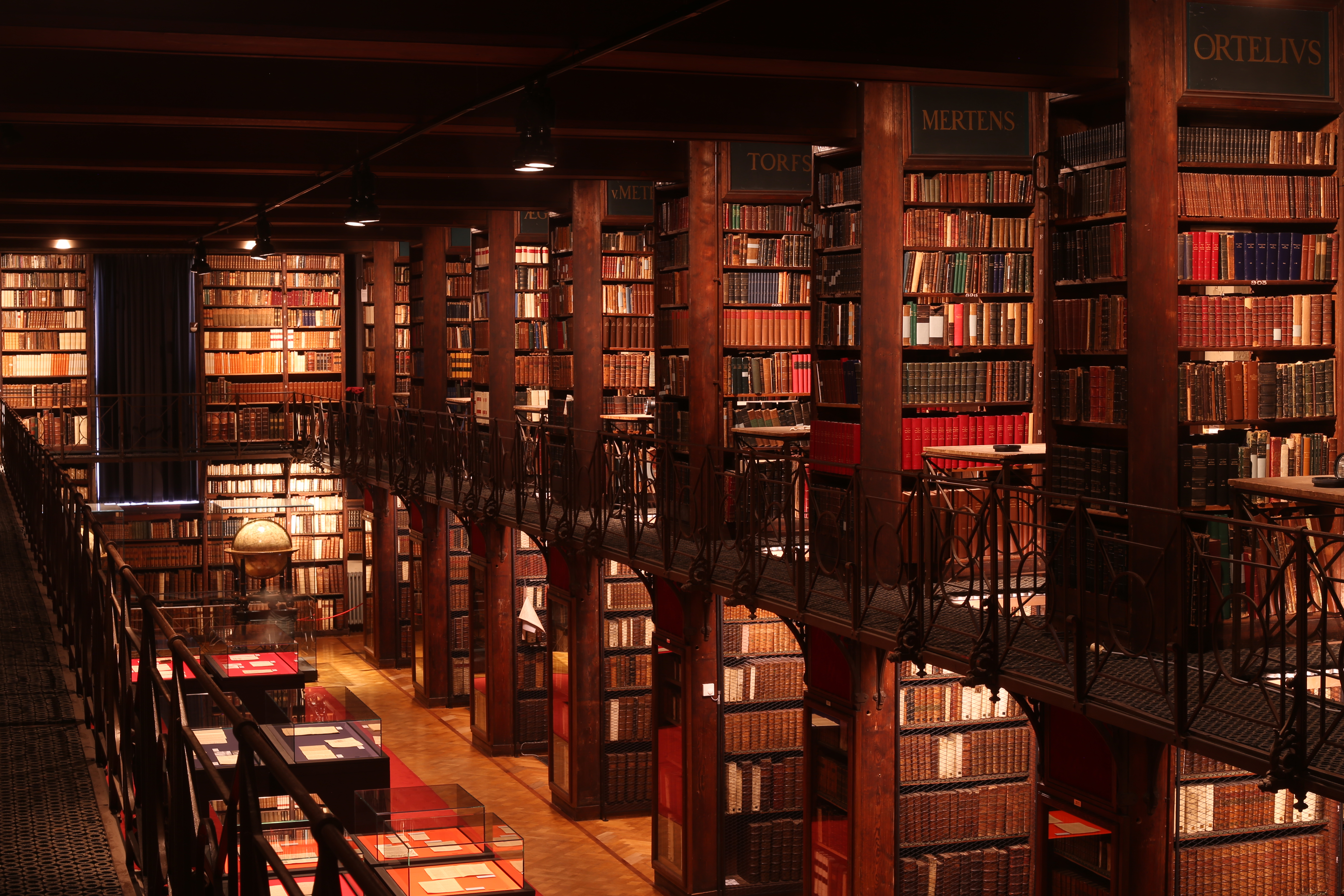
Nottebohmzaal or The Nottebohm Room

The Nottebohmzaal was designed as a space for exhibitions, lectures and as a storage space for museum objects. The hall was after Oscar Nottebohm, a businessman of German origin who was an important social and cultural patron for Antwerp. In his will, he donated a large amount of money to the City Library.

The Nottebohmzaal a preserves some of the foremost items from the library's collection, such as an Egyptian cabinet, celestial and terrestrial globes by William and Joan Blaeu, and several busts of European authors.

=== Korte Nieuwstraat ===
In the 1960s, the large magazine collection moved to an outbuilding at Minderbroedersrui. In 1996, more stacks and a new public entrance were built adjacent to the existing building, at Korte Nieuwstraat. At the same time the reading room was renovated. Because of the extra stacks, thee magazine collection could be accommodated by the main building again.

=== Reading Room ===
The reading room provides access to the collections of the library heritage. The entire library is retrievable via the digital catalog. The library does not lend books, but all works can be consulted in the reading room. Here, one can also read historical newspapers on microfilm and consult digital resources. In the reading room, current volumes of about one hundred magazines are available. There are various photocopiers and scanners available, and power connections for laptops and Wi-Fi.

== Collections ==
=== Dutch Literature ===
The library systematically collects all original publications of Flemish and Dutch authors in various literary genres (prose, poetry, drama, essay, comics), and all editions and translations of the literary work of Flemish authors, including work that is not distributed through the commercial circuit (poetry in-house, bibliophilic editions, etc.). The library also collects works on the history of Dutch literature, literature studies and literary criticism.

=== Study: cooperation Reading Foundation ===
The collection of Flemish children's literature is supplemented by the collections of the former National Centre for Children's Literature, now merged into Stichting Lezen. The library collects Flemish children's literature published before 1976. There is also an incomplete collection of Dutch children's literature.

=== History of Flanders ===
The library collects all publications on the history of Flanders, regardless of time or geographic changes (Burgundian Netherlands, French Flanders, United Netherlands, etc.): political history, social and economic history, church history, archaeology, biography, genealogy, heraldry, cartography, etc. In particular, the library collects publications about the history of the Flemish Movement, from the beginning (early pioneers in the 18th century) to the political independence of Flanders. Travel stories about Flanders are also part of the collection.

=== Flemish folk culture and local history ===
Publications on Flemish folklore and local history are systematically acquired. These (local) studies are often published by folklore or historical associations, local authorities, documentation centers, museums, archives, etc. The library has a cooperation agreement with Heemkunde Flanders. Both the Flemish and provincial local history organizations transferred their journal collection to the Heritage Library. Since 2004, all connected local history societies have provided their magazine to the collection.

=== Art in Flanders ===
Includes work on Flemish art and art history, like broad historical overviews, monographs and catalogs raisonnes on individual artists, exhibition catalogs, and museum catalogs. Featured art areas are painting and drawing, sculpture, architecture, photography and film, music, dance and applied arts.

Another part of the art collection consists of original books to which Flemish artists participated as an illustrator, which were often published as bibliophile editions.

=== Book history ===
The book history collection includes works on the history of the book in general ( writing, manuscripts, etc.), printing, technical and historical aspects about content, etc. The collection is geographically mainly based on Europe. In detail, its domains are typography, bookbinding, illustration techniques, paper study, book design, the history of publishing, bookstores, libraries, collectors, press essence, and bibliophile editions.

=== Antverpiensia ===
The library systematically collects all Antverpiensia – historical studies on the history of Antwerp, primary sources such as publications issued upon events in Antwerp (parades, celebrations, exhibitions, commemorations, etc.), publications of Antwerp publishers, and works by Antwerp authors.

=== Early printed books ===
The library holds an important collection of early printed books (books published before 1830), historically grown over the course of five centuries. The collection is constantly growing via donations (including through the Endowment Fund for Book and Literature) and purchases. Because of the exceptional size of the collection, its specific contents are extremely varied: history, literature, art, science, religion, etc. All kinds of print are represented: pamphlets, atlases, emblem books, ephemera (almanacs, occasional poems, etc.), plate works, musical works and so on. Manuscripts from the tenth to the twenty-first century are also part of the collection.

The main focus of the collection is Antwerp, with works on the history of the city and bibliographies about Antwerp authors and printers. Only publications by Plantin and his successors, the family Moretus are exclusively left to the Plantin-Moretus Museum. The library does not purchase works that are already present in other public collections in Antwerp.

== Dotatiefonds voor Boek en Letteren ==
The Dotatiefonds voor Boek en Letteren (The Endowment Fund for Book and Literature) is the friends association of the library and the letterenhuis.

It aims to raise public enthusiasm for the literary heritage. The association cast on the tradition in which citizens act as a patron. With the support of literary enthusiasts the fund prevents the written heritage for neglect. The Dotatiefonds sponsors the Erfgoedbibliotheek Hendrik Conscience and the Letterenhuis so they are able to expand their collections.
