= Balthasar I Moretus =

Flemish printer (1574-1641)

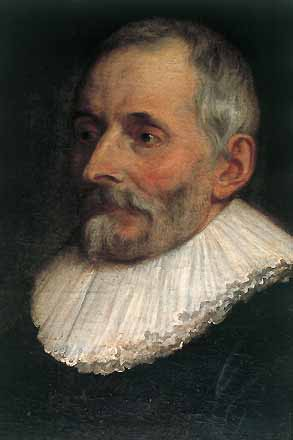
Portrait of Balthasar I Moretus by Peter Paul Rubens

Balthasar Moretus or Balthasar I Moretus (23 July 1574 – 6 July 1641) was a Flemish printer and head of the Officina Plantiniana, the printing company established by his grandfather Christophe Plantin in Antwerp in 1555. He was the son of Martina Plantin and Jan Moretus.

== Life ==
Moretus was the son of Jan Moretus and Martina Plantin, daughter of Christophe Plantin. Both of his parents had worked at the Plantin printing business.

Balthasar Moretus was paralysed on his right side. He studied for a few months under Justus Lipsius, but then fell sick and returned home to work in the office. At first he was a proofreader, but soon he took over more responsibilities. After the death of his father Jan Moretus in 1610, Balthasar took over the company together with his brother Jan II. After the death of Jan II in 1619, Balthazar started a partnership with Jan van Meurs, who was married to a sister of Maria De Sweert, the wife of Jan II Moretus. This lasted until 1629. By that time, Balthasar II Moretus, son of Jan II, was helping his uncle, and would eventually take over the company after his death in 1641. Balthasar I never married.

When he was the head of the Officina, he continued ordering illustrations from the workshop of engraver Theodore Galle. He also contacted Peter Paul Rubens to design title pages and provide other illustrations. He knew Rubens from his school period and they were lifelong friends. Apart from many book illustrations and designs, Balthasar also ordered 19 portraits from Rubens. Many of those are still preserved in the Plantin-Moretus Museum, and include portraits of Christoffel Plantin, Jan I Moretus and Justus Lipsius.

Balthasar I Moretus was also responsible for the expansion and completion of the buildings of the company, which now are the Plantin-Moretus Museum. They were built in the Renaissance style, and together with Rubens' house in Baroque style were considered highlights of early seventeenth century civil building in Antwerp. The Museum, both the building and the interior, is now a Unesco World Heritage Site.

== Works ==
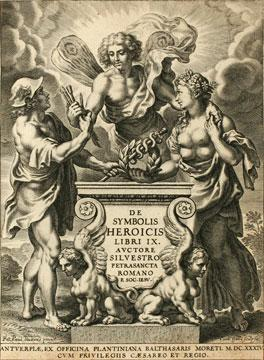
Title page of Silvester Petra Sancta, De symbolis heroicis book 9, from 1634

This is a very partial list of the works published during the years that Balthasar I Moretus was leading the Plantin company. Some of them are reprints of works published earlier by the Plantin company of by other companies, but most are first impressions. Until 1616, the books were officially printed by the widow and sons of Jan Moretus: between 1616 and 1618, by Jan and Balthasar Moretus; from 1618 until 1629, both the widow of Jan II and Jan van Meurs may be mentioned as co-printers: between 1629 and 1641, only Balthasar was mentioned.

- 1613: Balthasar Moretus, Iusti Lipsi sapientiæ et litterarum antistitis fama postuma
- 1613: Pedro de Ribadeneira, Catalogus scriptorum religionis Societatis Iesu
- 1613: Thomas Stapleton, Promptuarium morale super Evangelia dominicalia
- 1613: Missale Romanum, with illustrations by Rubens, reprinted 1618
- 1613: François d'Aguilon, Opticorum libri sex, with illustrations by Rubens
- 1614: Seneca the Younger, Opera, quae exstant omnia, with illustrations by Rubens
- 1614: Justus Lipsius, De militia romana
- 1614: Leonardus Lessius, Quae fides et religio sit capessenda
- 1614: Breviarium Romanum, with illustrations by Rubens
- 1615: Robert Bellarmine, De ascensione mentis in Deum
- 1617: Leonardus Lessius, De iustitia et iure, with illustrations by Rubens
- 1620: Henricus Culens, Spiritualium Strenarum ac variarum Concionum manipulus
- 1620: Robert Bellarmine, De arte bene moriendi
- 1621: Justus Lipsius, De Vesta et vestalibus syntagma
- 1621: Litaniae omnium Sanctorum, with engravings by the atelier of Theodore Galle
- 1622: Aubert Miraeus, De vita Alberti pii, sapientis, prudentis Belgarum principis commentarius
- 1622: Augustinus Mascardus, Silvarum, with illustrations by Rubens
- 1622: Henricus Culens, Thesaurus locorum communium, de nova et vetera proferuntur
- 1624: Biblia Sacra Vulgatae editionis
- 1626: Balthasar Cordier, Catena Sexaginta quinque Graecorum Patrum in S. Lucam, with illustrations by Rubens
- 1626: Joannes Malder, Tractatus de sigillo confessionis sacramentalis
- 1627: Pontificale Romanum iussu Clementis VIII Pont. Max.
- 1627: Libert Froidmont, Meteorologicorum
- 1628: Justus Lipsius, De constantia
- 1630: Balthasar Cordier, Catena patrum graecorum in Sanctum Joannem
- 1631: Libert Froidmont, Labyrinthus
- 1631: Erycius Puteanus, Diva virgo Bellifontana in Sequanis: loci ac pietatis descriptio
- 1631: Edmund Campion, Decem rationes propositae in causa fidei, et opuscula eius selecta
- 1633: Jodocus à Castro, Conciones super Evangelia dominicalia. Pars Hiemalis
- 1633: Balthasar Cordier, Opera S. Dionysii Areopagitae, with illustrations by Rubens
- 1634: Pedro de Bivero, Sacrum oratorium piarum imaginum immaculatae Mariae
- 1634: Silvester Petra Sancta, De symbolis heroicis
- 1635: Benedictus van Haeften, Regia via Crucis
- 1635: Maximilianus ab Eynatten, Manuale exorcismorum
- 1637: Justus Lipsius, Opera omnia, postremum ab ipso aucta et recensita
- 1637: Vincentius Guinisius, Lvcensis e Soc. Iesv Poesis
- 1638: Carolus Neapolis, Anaptyxis ad fastos P. Ovidii Nasonis
- 1640: Imago primi saeculi Societatis Iesu, celebrating 100 years of the Jesuit congregation

== Sources ==
- Metropolitan Museum: Information on Rubens' involvement with Moretus
- Max Rooses, Petrus-Paulus Rubens en Balthasar Moretus. Een bijdrage tot de geschiedenis der Kunst
- Leon Voet, The Golden Compasses: the history of the House of Plantin-Moretus chapter 4
