= Anna Maria de Neuf =

Publisher

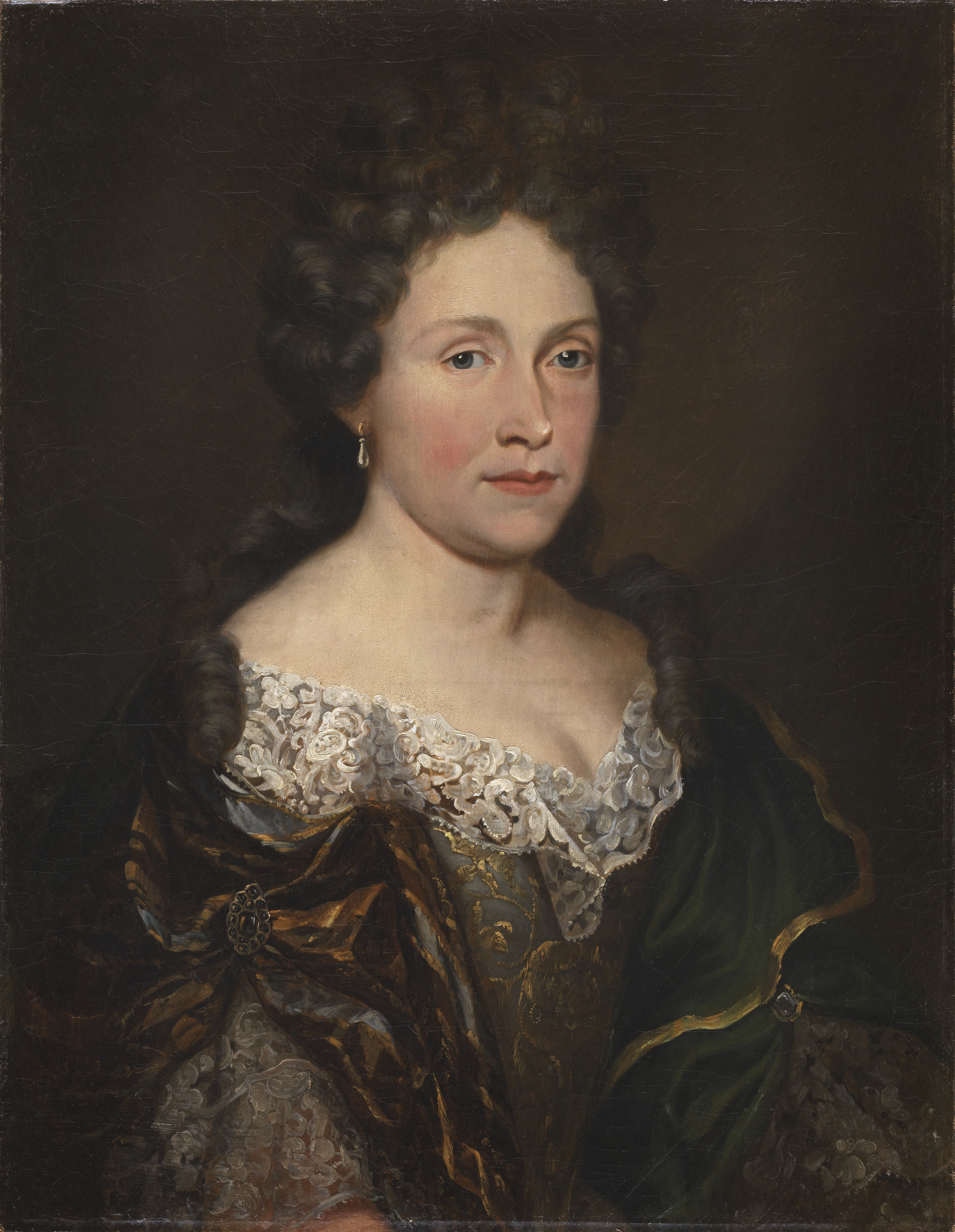
Anna-Maria de Neuf, collection Plantin-Moretus Museum

Anna Maria de Neuf (1654–1714), was a printer and manager of the Plantin Press in Antwerp, a leading publisher in Antwerp, from 1696 to 1714.

== Life ==
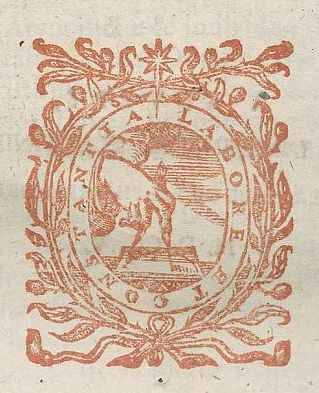
Printer's device of Anna Maria de Neuf

Anna Maria de Neuf was born in Antwerp where she was baptized in the Cathedral on 9 September 1654. She was the daughter of Simon, lord of Hooghelande, and lady Anna Steymans. Her family was titled and wealthy. She married Balthasar III Moretus in July 1673, with wedding celebrations occurring from 9 through 11 July, provided by his father Balthasar II Moretus and Anna's father, Simon.

Balthasar was the head of Officina Plantiniana (also known as Plantin Press) starting in 1674, when he partnered with his mother in running the firm. Her husband died the following year. Balthasar II died in 1674 after which his mother Anna Goos provided leadership and training to, and worked in partnership, with her son Balthasar III to run the printing business until he took over management of Officina Plantiniana on 17 November 1681. He primarily produced liurgical books within the country and Hispanic countries. He received the title of jonkheer on 1 September 1692 from the King of Spain.

De Neuf's husband died when she was 42 years of age. She ran the printing press business for 18 years, during which she reduced the number of work hours for her employees. She conducted business throughout the War of the Spanish Succession. De Neuf was the mother of Balthasar IV Moretus and Joannes Jacobus Moretus.

== See also ==
- List of women printers and publishers before 1800
