= Anna Goos =

Spain printer

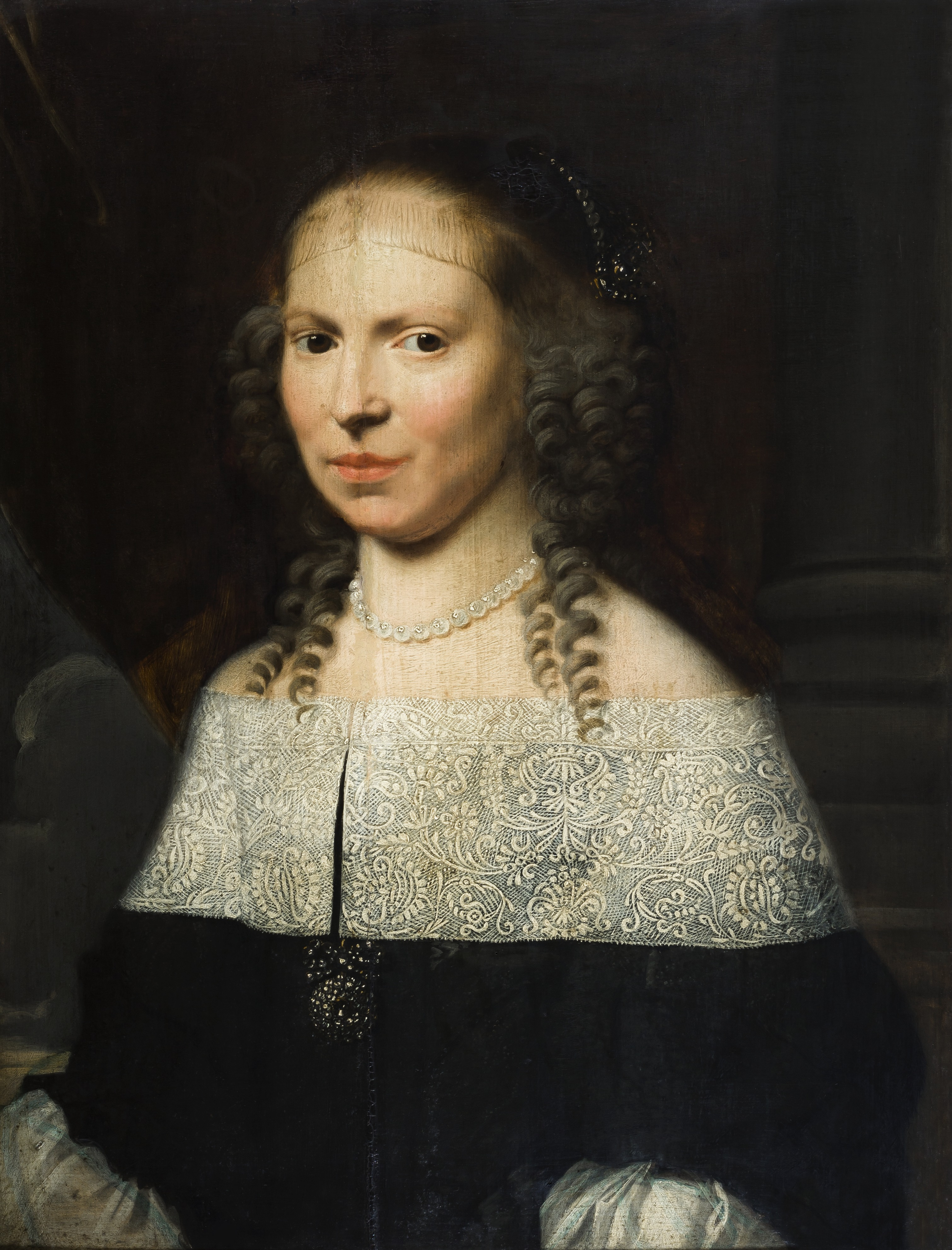
Jacob van Reesbroeck, Portrait of Anna Goos, oil on canvas, 1659, Plantin-Moretus Museum, Antwerp

Anna Goos (1627–1691), was a printer and co-manager of Officina Plantiniana (now called Plantin Press) in Antwerp from 1674 to 1681. She prepared her son, Balthasar III Moretus, to run the business, during politically and financially turbulent times, such as during the Franco-Dutch War (1672–1678) and the financial collapse in Spain that affected their largest client, the Hieronymite Fathers of San Lorenzo in Royal Site of San Lorenzo de El Escorial. Her leadership helped prevent the business from closing down during these times.

== Biography ==
Goos was raised in an aristocratic family. She married Balthasar II Moretus when she was eighteen and he was thirty. Balthasar was the son of Jan II Moretus and Maria De Sweert (1588 - 1655) and the grandson of Jan Moretus and Martina Plantin. Like those before him, Balthasar continued to publish liturgical books. Although he endeavored to also publish literary and historical books, by the end of his career nearly all of the books that were published were religious books due its profitability.

Described as "energetic and capable woman", she took over management of the business in 1673. Her husband died the following year. She provided leadership and training, and worked in partnership, with her son Balthasar III Moretus, so that he could take over running the business.

She took over bookkeeping of the firm and addressed a payment crisis. Their major client, the Hieronymite Fathers of San Lorenzo in Royal Site of San Lorenzo de El Escorial, suffered under a national financial crisis and were unable to pay their bills beginning about 1675. The monks also had books printed by a low-cost printer who used the Officina Plantiniana name in their publications. Under her direction, Balthasar traveled to Spain and resolved contractual breaches and negotiated a repayment schedule.

Balthasar returned to Antwerp and took over management of Officina Plantiniana on 17 November 1681. The business also suffered, but did not close, during the Franco-Dutch War (1672–1678).

Goos lived in the Plantin house called the Golden Compass and selected the artwork and their placement in the house. She wore clothing and her hair was coifed in the style of the day and befitting her station.

== See also ==
- List of women printers and publishers before 1800
