= Martina Plantin =

Flemish lace merchant and printer

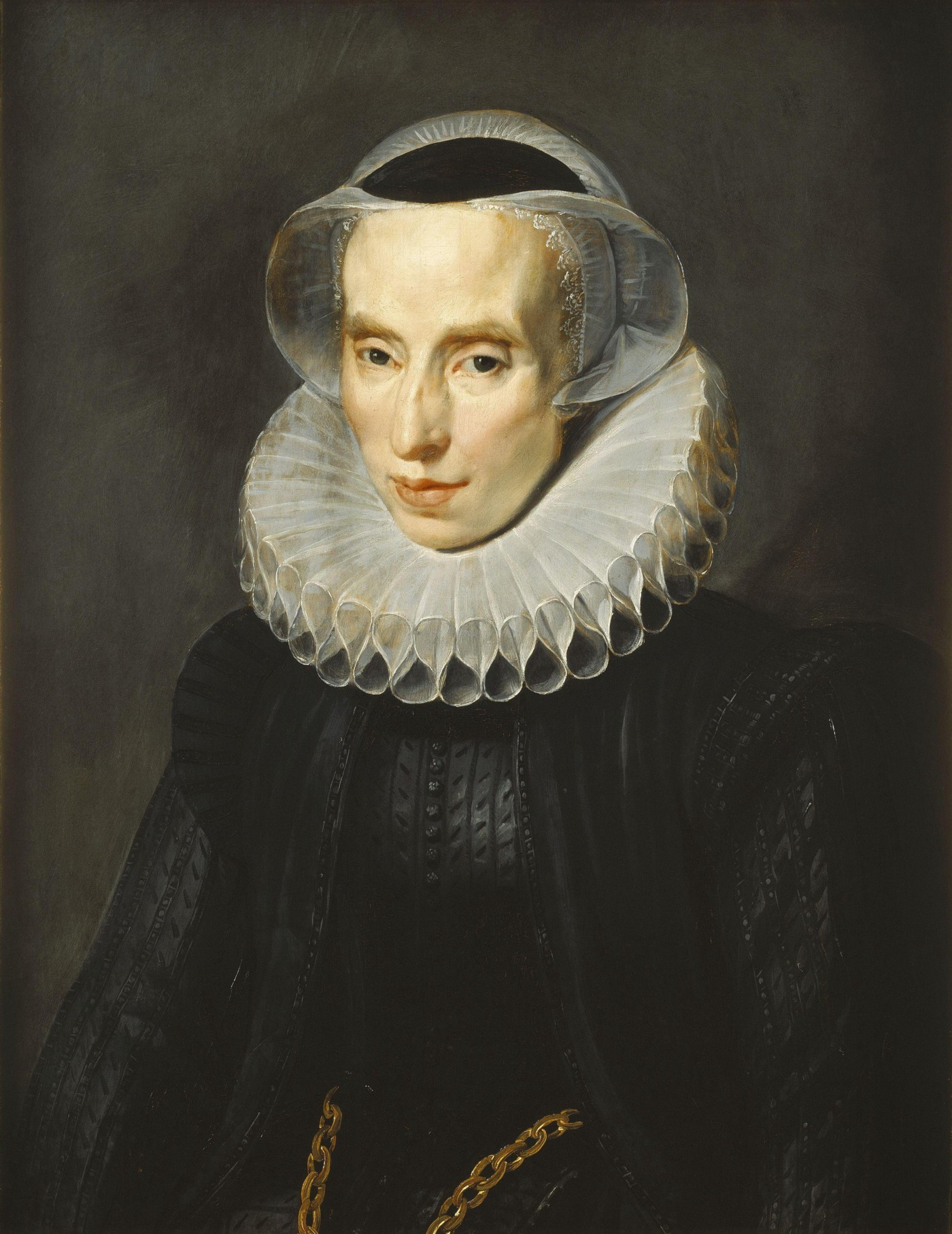
- Peter Paul Rubens, Martina Plantin
- Born: 1550
- Died: 1616 (aged 65–66)
- Occupation: Printer
- Years active: 1610–1614
- Known for: Head of the Plantin-Moretus printing dynasty

Martina Plantin (1550–1616) was involved in her father's printing business from five years of age, and ran the family lace shop from the age of 17. After her father and husband had died, she was the head of the Plantin-Moretus printing business from 1610 to 1614, with daily operations managed by her sons Balthasar and Jan. She was considered a "formidable businesswoman from the wealthy bourgeoisie" and the head of the Plantin-Moretus printing dynasty, by marrying Jan Moretus and being the daughter of publisher Christophe Plantin.

== Early life and education ==
Plantin was the second daughter of the publisher Christophe Plantin and Jeanne Rivière. (Note: Justus Lipsius, a family friend, said of her mother that "She [Jeanne Rivière] was a virtuous wife, without vanity and not given to finely; she loved her husband and was fully conversant with all matters appertaining to the management of the family...") Born in 1550, her birth followed her parents move from France to Antwerp in 1548 or 1549. The Plantins had five daughters: Margareta, Martina, Catharina, Magdalena and Henrica. There were two sons who did not survive through infancy.

She learned to read and write at a young age, possibly both French and Dutch, and may have been taught the basics of Latin, Greek, and Hebrew languages. Her father planned the lessons for his daughters so that they would be skilled at managing households and businesses. He tailored the training for each daughter depending upon her strengths and capabilities. For instance, one of his daughters had been apprenticed to be an engraver, until she began to lose her sight. Christoper Plantin's daughters were expected to work in the family's businesses. By the age of five, Plantin corrected printed texts in the print shop. She ran the family's lace business beginning in 1567, when she was seventeen years of age. She continued to work there after she was married and ceased working at the lace shop in 1573. (Note: Her younger sister Catherina worked in the lace business, too, during her teenage years.)

The Plantin daughters do not appear to have been unique. Of 16th-century women from the Netherlands, Lodovico Guicciardini stated in his book Descrittione di tutti i Paesi Bassi:

The women, apart from the fact that they are (as I have said above) of comely and excellent form, carry themselves well, and are graceful: for they begin from earliest childhood, after the custom of the country, to converse freely with any and everybody: for this reason they become quick and adept in their habits and speech and in all other things: and yet with such great liberty and freedom they nevertheless maintain an honesty and seemliness that are most commendable, often going about their business unaccompanied, not only within the town but also frequently across country from one town to another with very little company and yet without incurring blame. They are assuredly most serious and most active: dealing not only with domestic matters, with which very few men have to do, but concerning themselves with buying and selling goods, and property, and turning both hand and voice to all the other masculine concerns: they accomplish everything with such skill and diligence that in several places in the province, as in Holland and Zealand, the men leave them to do almost everything: such a way of doing things added to the natural feminine desire to dominate, undoubtedly makes them too imperious by far and sometimes too disagreeable and proud. But let us pass on.

== Marriage and printing career ==
In 1570, she married Jan Moretus (1542–1610), who worked for her father beginning in 1557, at 14 years of age. Plantin's father and husband ran the printing business on an industrial scale, which was revolutionary at the time. (Note: Christophe was known as "one of the most important publishers of the Renaissance". He printed polyglot Bibles, such as Plantin Polyglot, as well as Greek and Latin classics. Editors, scholars, and proof-readers benefited from his large collection of manuscripts, including Illuminated Manuscripts.) The business reached its peak between 1574 and 1576. With 80 employees and 22 printing presses, it was the largest printing business in the world, however its success dwindled significantly to 16 employees and four presses by the time of Christophe Plantin's death. There were two printing shops, one in Antwerp and another in Leiden. Moretus, who was the director and played a significant role in the success of the printing business, inherited the business, Officina Plantiniana Antwerp location after Christopher Plantin's death. (Note: There were no sons to inherit Christopher Plantin's estate. After the will was read, there was a disagreement among family members that was subsequently settled with the following agreement: Rivière would receive an annuity, Moretus received the Antwerp press business, one brother-in-law, Frans Raphelengius, retained the Leiden press shop. There were properties on Heilige-Geeststraat in Bruges that were inherited by the remaining sister's families. Moretus received the most valuable property, because, as stated in the will, he had been the director of the organization and he was instrumental in making it a successful business. Jeanne Rivière was the official head of the organization, but Moretus ran the organization. After his mother-in-law's death in 1596, Moretus officially owned the business.)

The business increased over time and had seven printing presses by the time of Moretus' death in 1610, after which Plantin was the nominal head and owner of the printing business from 1610 to 1614, when she stopped all business activities. She is one of the authors of Biblia sacra: quid in hac editione, à theologis louaniensibus praestitum sit, paulo pòst indicatur (1584 / 1590) and Catechimvs Romanvs, ex decreto Concilii Tridentini, & Pii V. Pontificis Maximi iussu primùm editus (1611).

Plantin and Moretus had five daughters and six sons. Plantin, through her marriage to Moretus, was considered to be the head of the printing dynasty that lasted for more than three centuries. Her sons, Balthasar and Jan, inherited the printing business and bookshop.

== Death and memorial ==
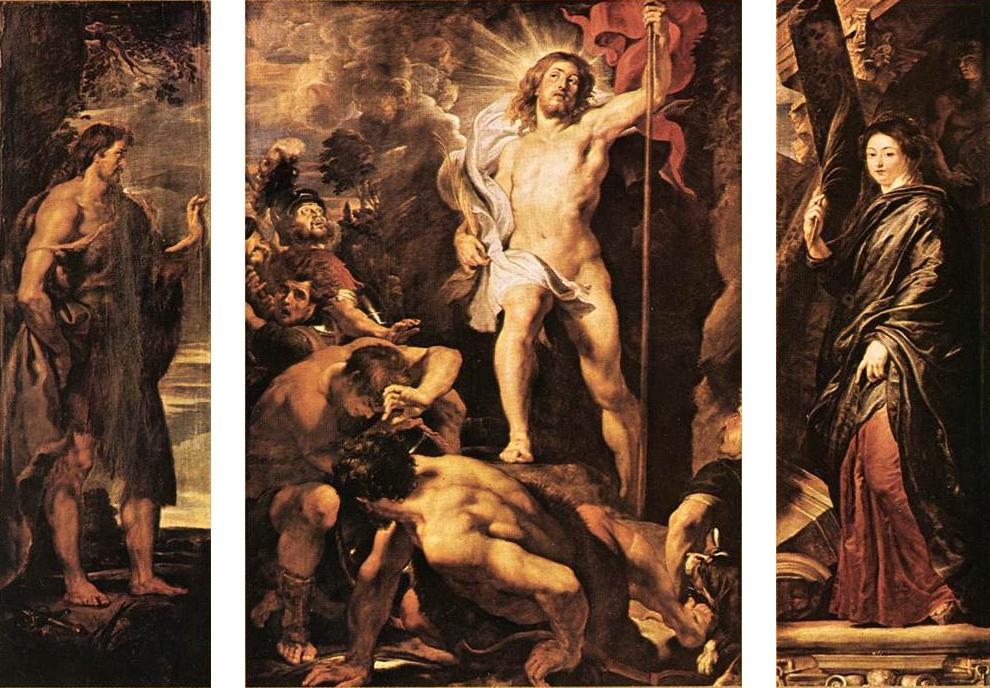
Peter Paul Rubens, The Resurrection of Christ, Cathedral of Our Lady in Antwerp, depicted with John the Baptist and Martina of Rome, patron saints of the deceased and his wife, on the side panels

Moretus died in 1610 and Plantin died six years later. They were both buried at the Cathedral of Our Lady in Antwerp. Peter Paul Rubens, who was commissioned by the family, painted a triptych of the Resurrection of Christ with the John the Baptist and Saint Martina, patron saints of the deceased and his wife on the side panels. (Note: Peter Paul Rubens was commissioned by the Plantin-Moretus family to paint portraits of Martina's family members, including her parents-in-law Adraina Gras and Jacob Moretus; Martina, her mother Jeanne Rivière. Family portraits and religious paintings such as The Virgin and Child and St Joseph hung in the great hall of the Plantin's house in Antwerp and later became part of the collection of the Plantin-Moretus Museum.) At the time of their death, there were just five of their eleven children who survived their parents.

== See also ==
- List of women printers and publishers before 1800
