= Christophe Plantin =

French humanist, publisher and printer (c.1520–1589)

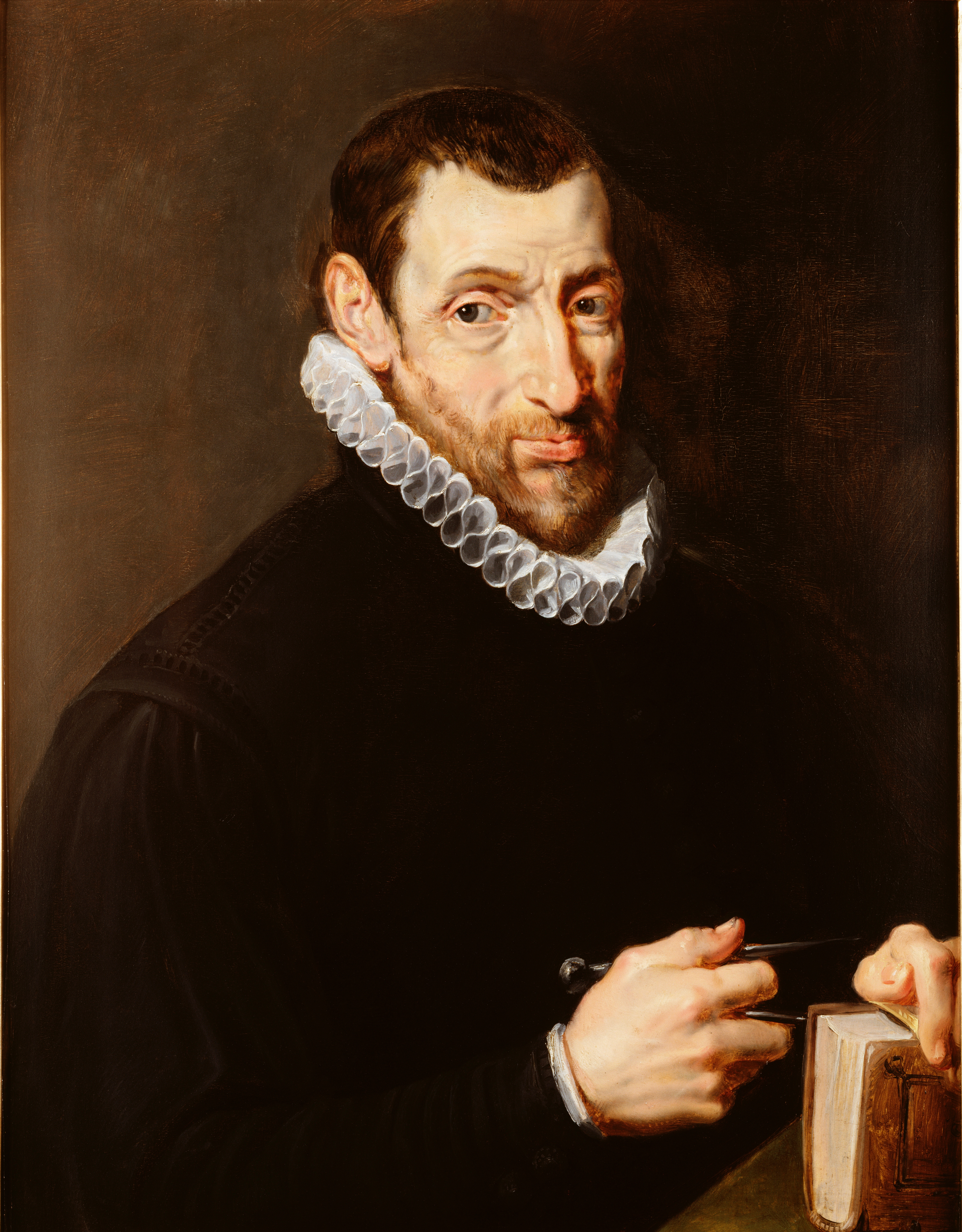
- Posthumous portrait of Plantin by Rubens
- Born: c. 1520; Kingdom of France
- Died: 1 July 1589; Antwerp, Duchy of Brabant
- Resting place: Antwerp
- Years active: 1548–1589
- Known for: Plantin Press

Christophe Plantin (Dutch: Christoffel Plantijn; c. 1520 – 1 July 1589) was a French Renaissance humanist and book printer and publisher who resided and worked in Antwerp. He established in Antwerp one of the most prominent publishing houses of his time, the Plantin Press. It played a significant role in making Antwerp a leading centre of book publishing in Europe. The publishing house was continued by his successors until 1867.

== Life ==
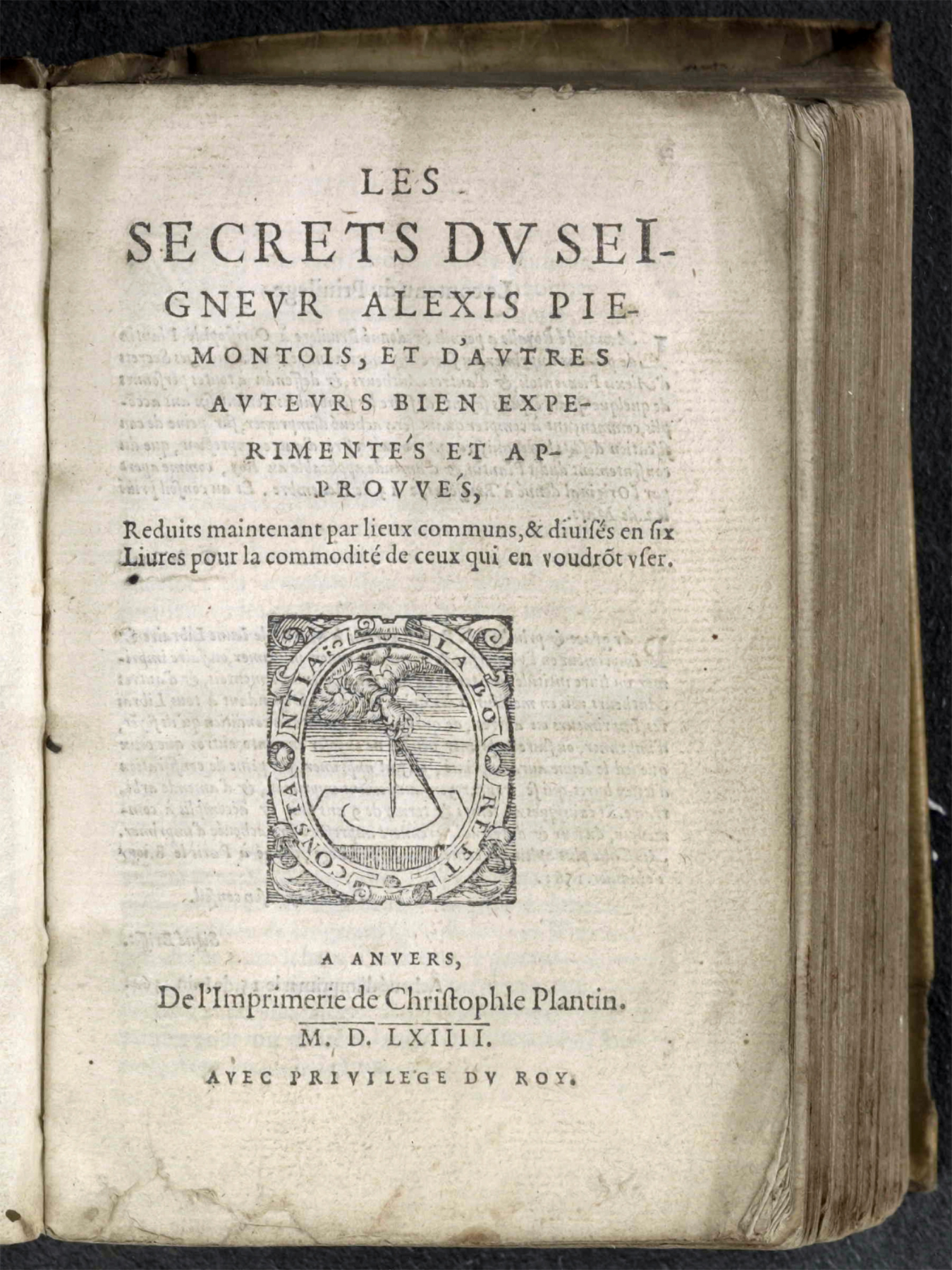
A Plantin Press title page with compass vignette with motto "Labore et Constantia"

Plantin was born in France, probably in Saint-Avertin, near the city of Tours, Touraine. He was not born to a wealthy family, and his mother died when Plantin was still quite young. As a youth he apprenticed as a bookbinder in Caen, Normandy, and also married there. In 1545, he and his wife, Joanna Rivière, set up shop in Paris, but after three years, they chose to relocate to the booming commercial centre of Antwerp, where Plantin became a free citizen and a member of the Guild of St Luke, the guild responsible for painters, sculptors, engravers and printers. The quality of his work as a bookbinder brought him into contact with nobility and wealth. By 1549, he headed one of the most well-respected publishing houses in Europe. He was responsible for printing a wide range of titles, from Cicero to religious hymnals. While delivering a prestigious commission, he was mistakenly attacked and received an arm wound that prevented him from labouring as a bookbinder and led him to concentrate on typography and printing. By 1555, he had his own print shop and was an accomplished printer. The first book he is known to have printed was La Institutione di una fanciulla nata nobilmente, by Giovanni Michele Bruto, with a French translation. This was soon followed by many other works in French and Latin, which in point of execution rivalled the best printing of his time. The art of engraving then flourished in the Habsburg Netherlands, and Dutch engravers illustrated many of his editions. Antwerp was a dangerous place for publishers around the time. In 1561, the Spanish governor ordered a raid on Plantin's workshop for possibly housing heretical works and being a Protestant sympathizer. To avoid being jailed, Plantin quickly sold all of his works so that nothing would be found in his possession. As soon as things calmed down around him, he bought them all back.

In 1562, while Plantin was absent in Paris, his workmen printed a heretical pamphlet, which resulted in his presses and goods being seized and sold. It seems, however, that he eventually recovered much of the value that was taken from him. With the help of four Antwerp merchants, he was able to re-establish and expand his printing business significantly. Among these friends were two grand-nephews of Daniel Bomberg, who furnished him with the fine Hebrew typefaces of that renowned Venetian printer. The co-venture lasted only until 1567 but enabled Plantin to acquire a house in the Hoogstraat which he named "De Gulden Passer" (The Golden Compasses). This gesture mirrors the commercial success of publishing emblem books, which present collections of images paired with short, often cryptic, text explanations. It is also at this time that Plantin adopted a printer's mark which would appear in various forms on the title pages of all Plantin Press books. The motto Labore et Constantia ("By Labor and Constancy") surrounds the symbol of a pair of compasses held by a hand extending from a bank of clouds and inscribing a circle. The center point of the compasses indicates constancy, the moving point which renders the circle is the labor. Plantin holds the instrument in portraits of him, such as the one commissioned from the Flemish painter Peter Paul Rubens.

In November 1576, the Spaniards plundered and burned Antwerp, which essentially ended its supremacy as the commercial centre and richest city of Europe, and Plantin had to pay an exorbitant ransom to protect his printing works. He established a branch of his firm in Paris. In 1583, the States of Holland sought a typographer for the newly erected university of Leiden. Plantin temporarily moved to Leiden, leaving his business in Antwerp in the care of his sons-in-law Jan Moretus and Frans van Ravelingen (Raphelengius). After Antwerp became more settled with its surrender in 1585 to the Prince of Parma, Plantin returned to the city, leaving his Leiden office to Raphelengius. Plantin laboured in Antwerp until his death.

== Printing work ==
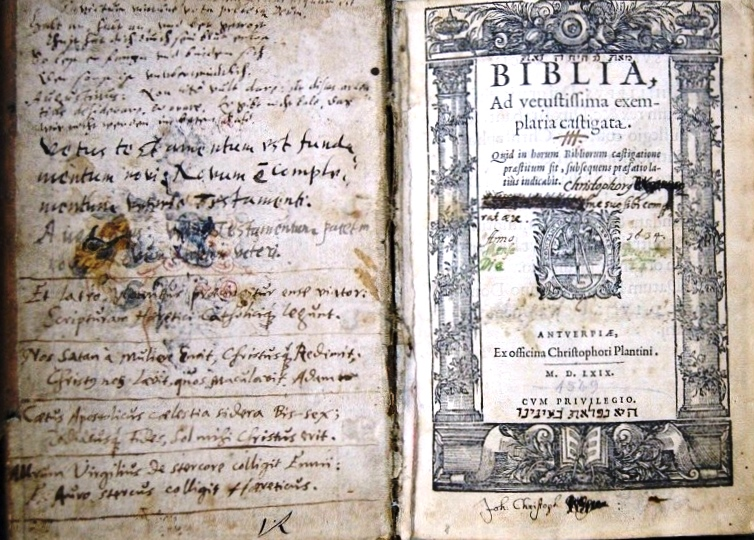
A 1569 Christopher Plantin Bible

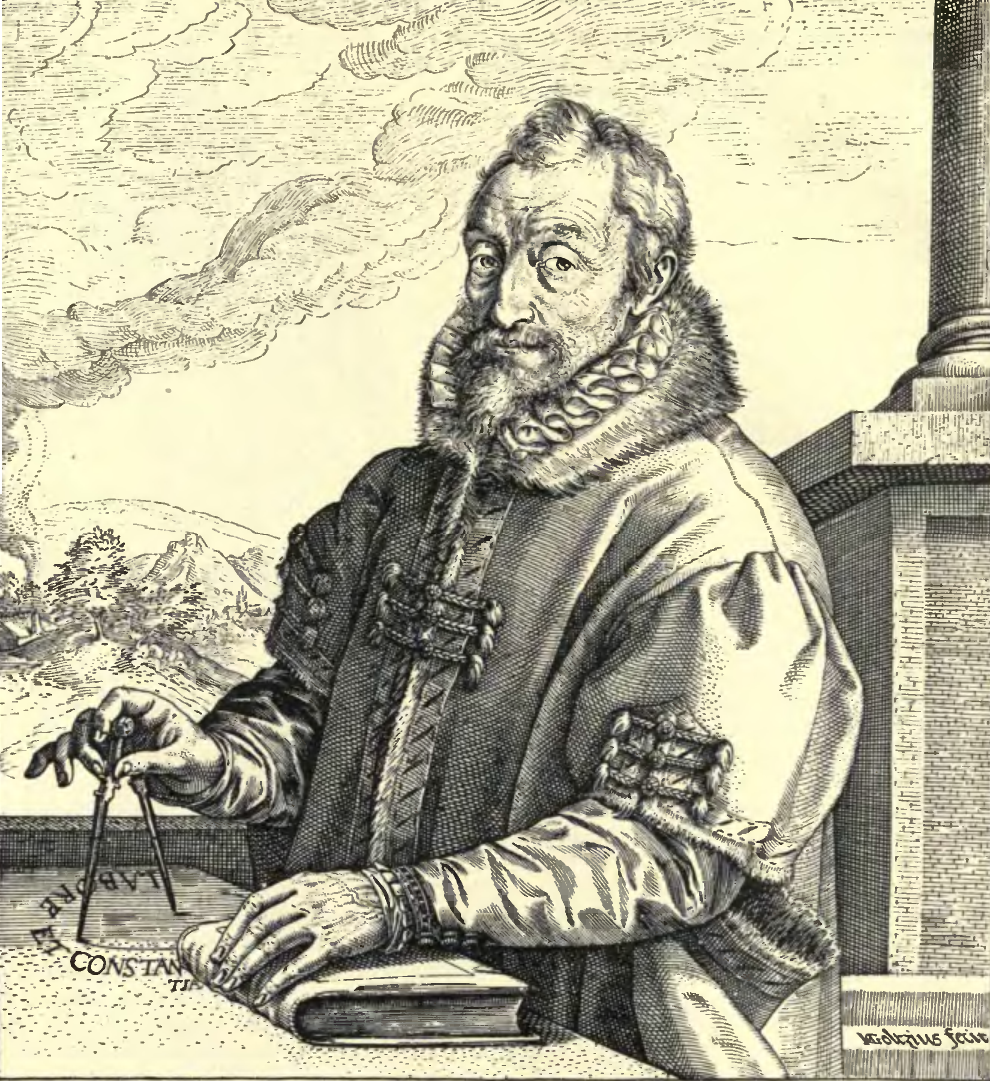
Christophe Plantin enacts his printer's mark and motto Labore et Constantia ("By Labor and Constancy")

Plantin was a prolific printer and prosperous entrepreneur, publishing more than 40 editions of emblem books. His most important work is considered to be the Biblia Regia (King's Bible), also known as the Plantin Polyglot. Facing increasing pressure and turmoil in the Habsburg Netherlands, Plantin needed to find a patron that would not fall victim to claims of heresy or being a Protestant sympathizer. In spite of clerical opposition, Plantin was encouraged by King Philip II of Spain, who sent him the learned Benito Arias Montano to lead the editorship. The Polyglot Bible has parallel texts in Latin, Greek, Syriac, Aramaic, and Hebrew. This venture for Plantin was very expensive, requiring him to mortgage his own business to pay for the production of this bible, in the hope that there would be a worthwhile payoff in the end. It took thirteen presses and fifty-three men to complete the task. Characters in each of the printed languages were required, with French type designer Claude Garamond providing the steel punches. With Montano's zealous help, the work was finished in four years (1568 - 1572). There were eight volumes in folio format, meaning only two pages could be printed at one time. This work earned Plantin little profit, but resulted in Philip's granting him the privilege of printing all Roman Catholic liturgical books (missals, breviaries, etc.) for the states ruled by Philip, the title "Architypographus Regii," ("chief printer of the king") which he dutifully added to the title pages of Plantin Press books, and the unwanted duty of prototypo-graphus regius, obligating him to inspect and verify the skill and dogmatic adherence of other printers.

Besides the Plantin Polyglot, Plantin published many other works of note, such as the "Dictionarium Tetraglotton" of 1562, which was a dictionary in Greek, Latin, French and Flemish, editions of St. Augustine and St. Jerome, the botanical works of Dodonaeus, Clusius and Lobelius, and the description of the Habsburg Netherlands by Guicciardini. His editions of the Bible in Hebrew, Latin and Dutch, his Corpus juris, Latin and Greek classics, and many other works are renowned for their beautiful execution and accuracy. A skillful businessman, by 1575 his printing firm comprised more than 20 presses and 73 workmen, plus various specialists who did job-work out of their homes. The vast collection of handwritten ledgers and letters of the Officina Plantiniana, as it was known, can be examined online following digitization by the Museum Plantin-Moretus and hosting by World Digital Library.

Though outwardly a faithful member of the Catholic Church, he appears to have used his resources to support several sects of heretics, sometimes known as the Family of Love or Familists. It is now proven that many of their books, published without naming the printer, came from Plantin Press.

== Legacy ==
After Plantin's death, his firm was taken over by his son-in-law, Jan Moretus who ran his shop in Antwerp, and Francis van Ravelinghen who took over his shop in Leiden. Towards the end of the 17th century, the business began to decline. Plantin's works however, were meticulously preserved. Today, the building that housed the firm is called the Plantin-Moretus Museum. Moretus and his descendants continued to print many works of note in officina Plantiniana, but the firm began to decline in the second half of the 17th century. It remained, however, in the possession of the Moretus family, which left everything in the office untouched, and when the city of Antwerp acquired (for 1.2 million francs) the old buildings with all their contents, the authorities created, with little trouble, the Musee Plantin, which opened on 19 August 1877.

In 1968, the Christophe Plantin Prize was created in his memory, given to a Belgian civilian who resides abroad, who has made significant contributions to cultural, artistic or scientific activities.

== Family tree ==
The Plantin-Moretus family tree, including the heads of Officiana Plantiniana, later known as Plantin Press.

Christophe Plantin (1520–1589) married Joanna Riviere; they had five daughters and a son. Christophe's daughters were described as learned in reading and writing, especially Greek and Latin. One teenage daughter is said to have helped proofread the Plantin Polygot.

- Margaretha Plantin married Franciscus Raphelengius, who led the Leiden branch of the house. They stayed printers in Leiden for two more generations of Van Ravelinge, until 1619. A great-granddaughter of the last Van Ravelinge printer married in 1685 Jordaen Luchtmans, founder of what would become later the still existing Brill Publishers.
- Magdalena Plantin, was reported to have aided her father in proofreading the Biblia Regia in five different languages; “it was said that she could correct the script perfectly accurately, but without understanding a word of it.” Magdalen would later marry her father's Paris agent. She married Gilles Beys, who then ran the French branch of the Plantin office. This continued for one more generation under their son, Christophe Beys.
- Martina Plantin, who with her sister, Catherine, helped run the family's silk shop by the age of seventeen. Martina and Catherine were efficient and well known in their silk handlings. Later, Martina married Jan Moretus (Jan or Joannes Moerentorf) (1543–1610) in 1570. They had 10 children. After her husband's death, Martina was the head of the firm until her sons took over running the business.
  - Balthasar I Moretus (1574–1641)
  - Jan II Moretus (1576–1618) married Maria De Sweert; they had 6 children
    - Balthasar II Moretus (1615–1674) married Anna Goos; they had 12 children
      - Balthazar III Moretus (1646–1696) married Anna Maria de Neuf; they had 9 children
        - Balthazar IV Moretus (1679–1730) married Isabella Jacoba De Mont (or De Brialmont); they had 8 children
        - Joannes Jacobus Moretus (1690–1757) married Theresia Mechtildis Schilder; they had 9 children
          - Franciscus Joannes Moretus (1717–1768) married Maria Theresia Borrekens, who led the office after Franciscus' death until her death in 1797. They had 13 children
            - Jacobus Paulus Josephus Moretus (1756–1808)
            - Ludovicus Franciscus Xaverius Moretus (1758–1820)
            - Josephus Hyacinthus Moretus (1762–1810) married Maria Henrica Coleta Wellens; they had 8 children
              - Albertus Franciscus Hyacinthus Fredericus Moretus (1795–1865)
              - Eduardus Josephus Hyacinthus Moretus (1804–1880). He sold the office to the city of Antwerp in 1876, after having printed the last book in 1866.
- Henrica, the fifth daughter, married Pieter Moerentof, the younger brother of Jan I. Moretus.

== See also ==
- Dirk Martens
- Plantin (typeface)
- Lodewijk Elzevir
