= Silvester Petra Sancta =

Italian Jesuit priest, and heraldist

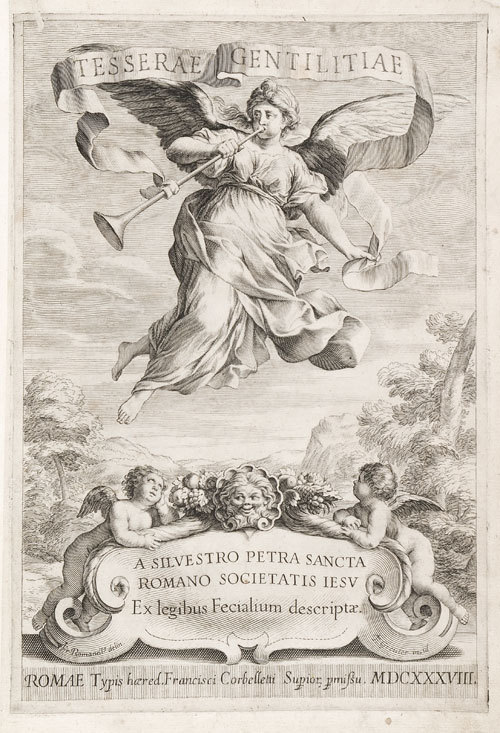
Frontispiece to Petra Sancta's Tesserae Gentilitiae (1638)

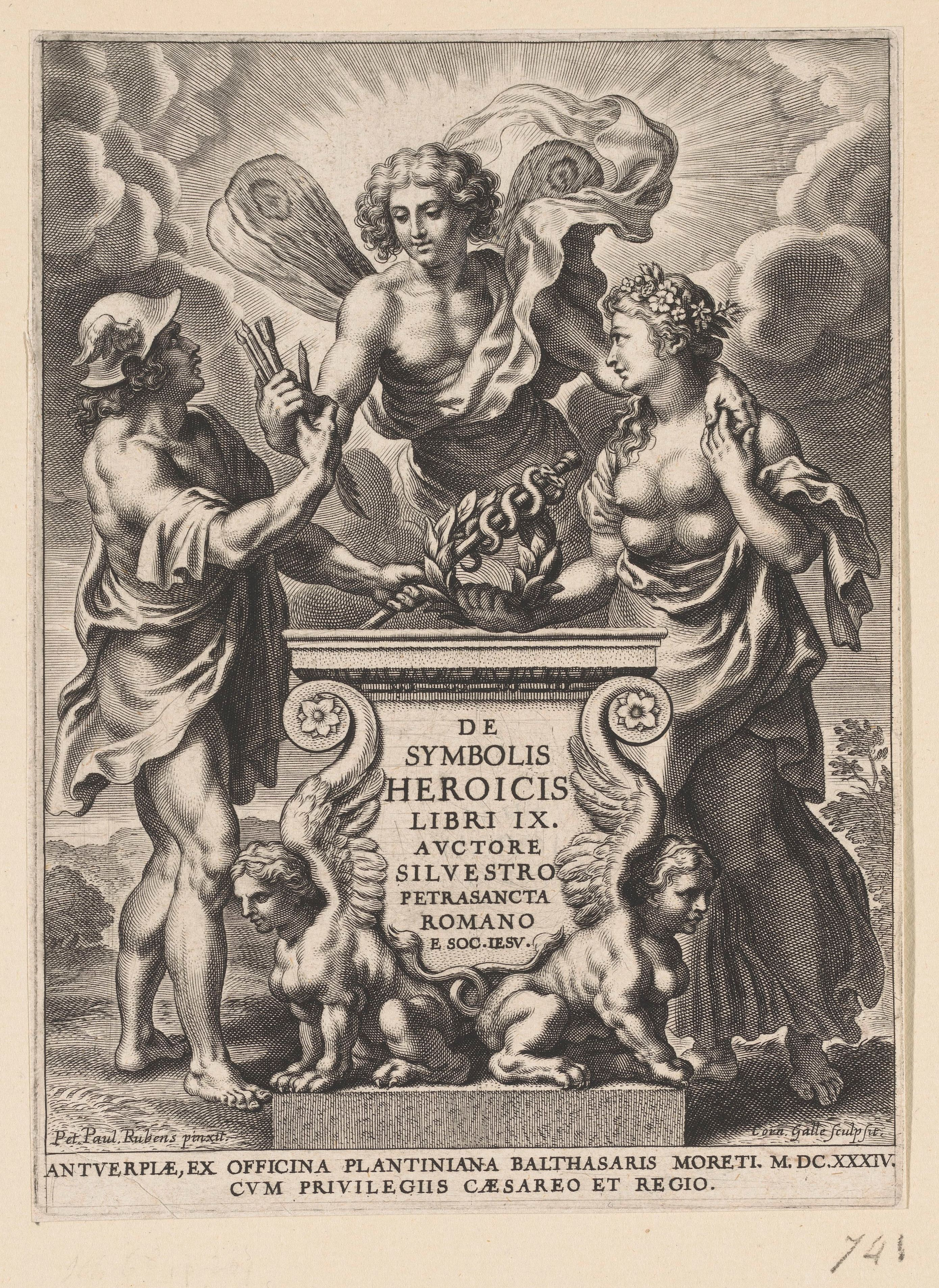
The title page of Petra Sancta's De Symbolis heroicis (1634)

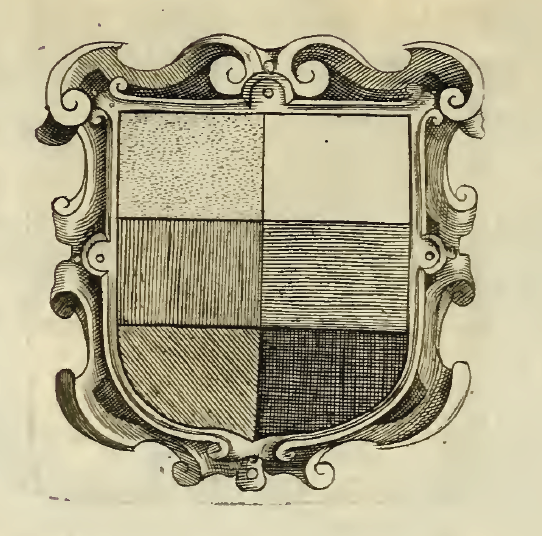
Hatching table (De symbolis heroicis, 1634)

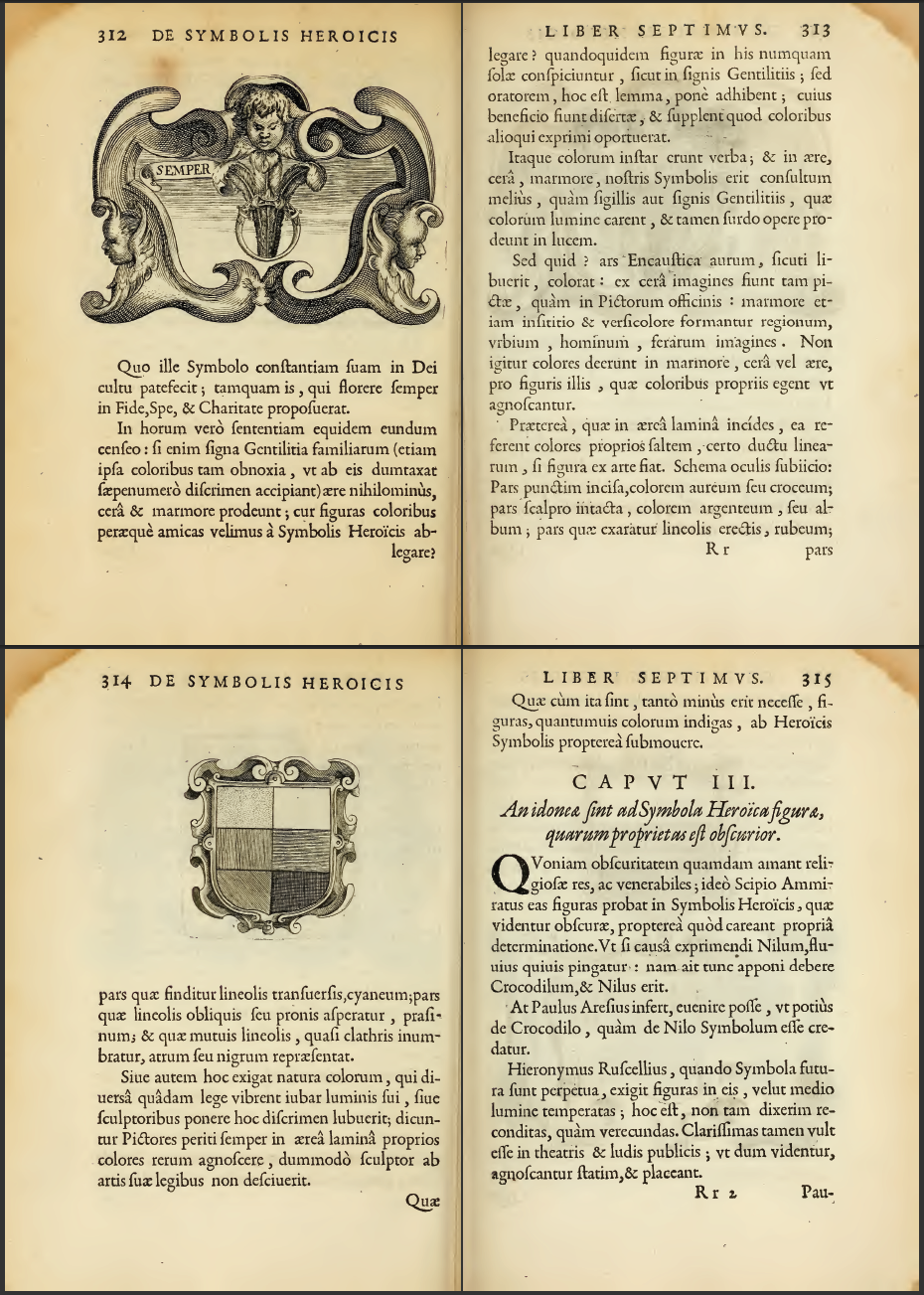
Description of hatching system (De symbolis heroicis, 1634)

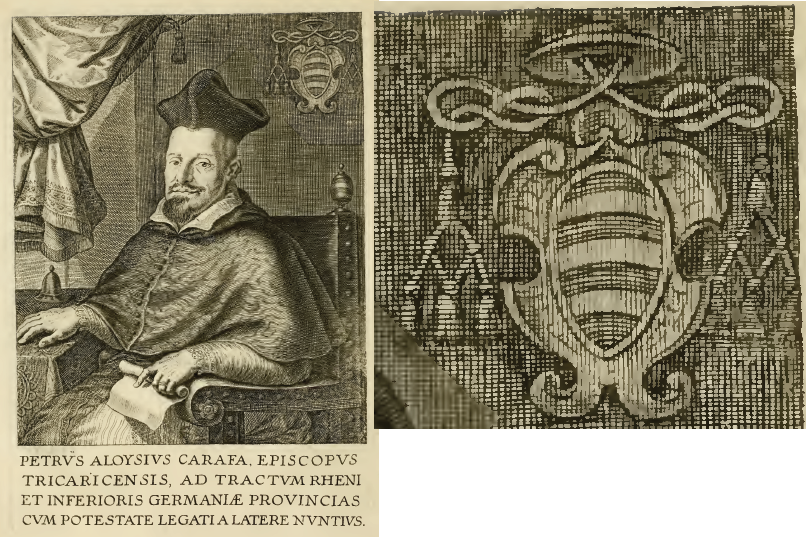
The portrait of cardinal Carafa from the book De Symbolis heroicis (with kind of a screening, not heraldic hatching at the escutcheon)

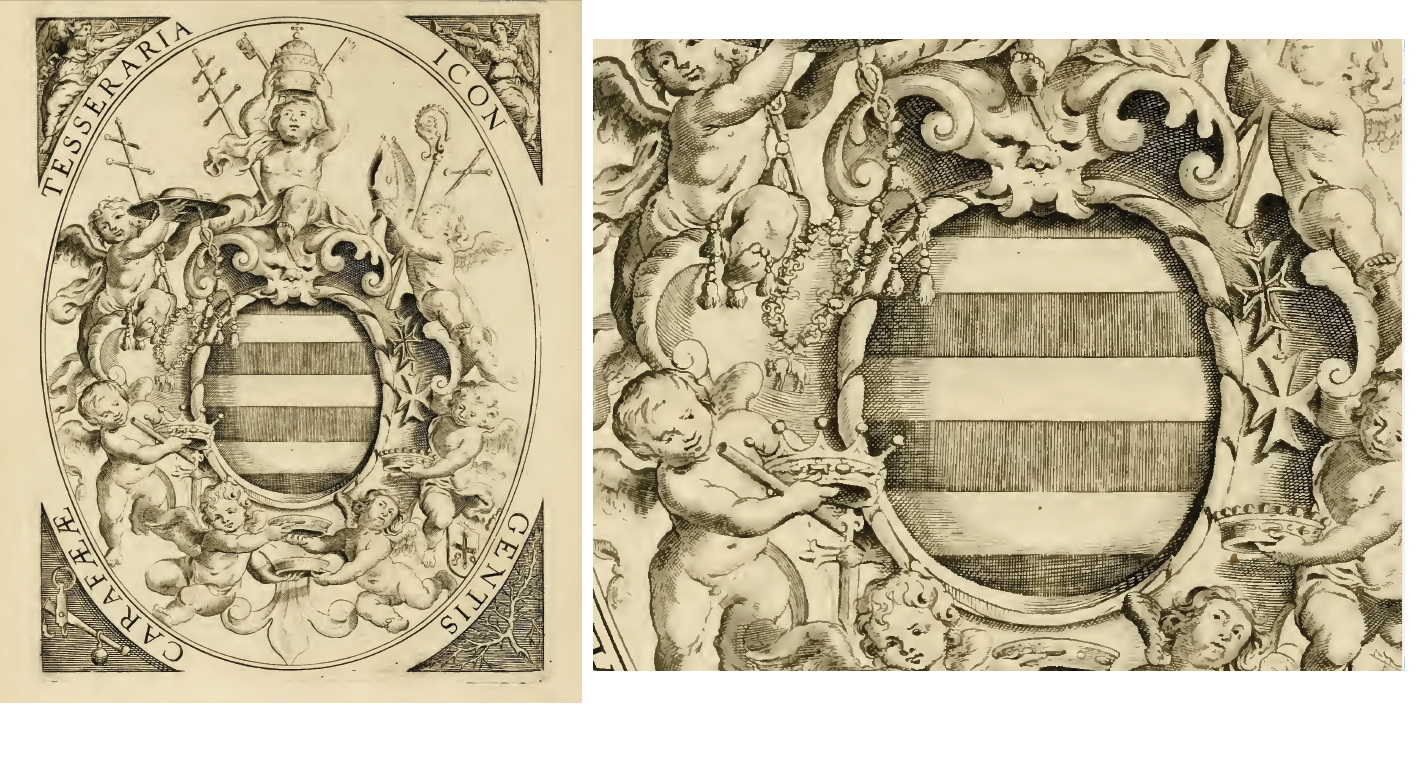
The Carafa coat of arms (De symbolis heroicis, 1634) with screening, not heraldic hatching at the escutcheon

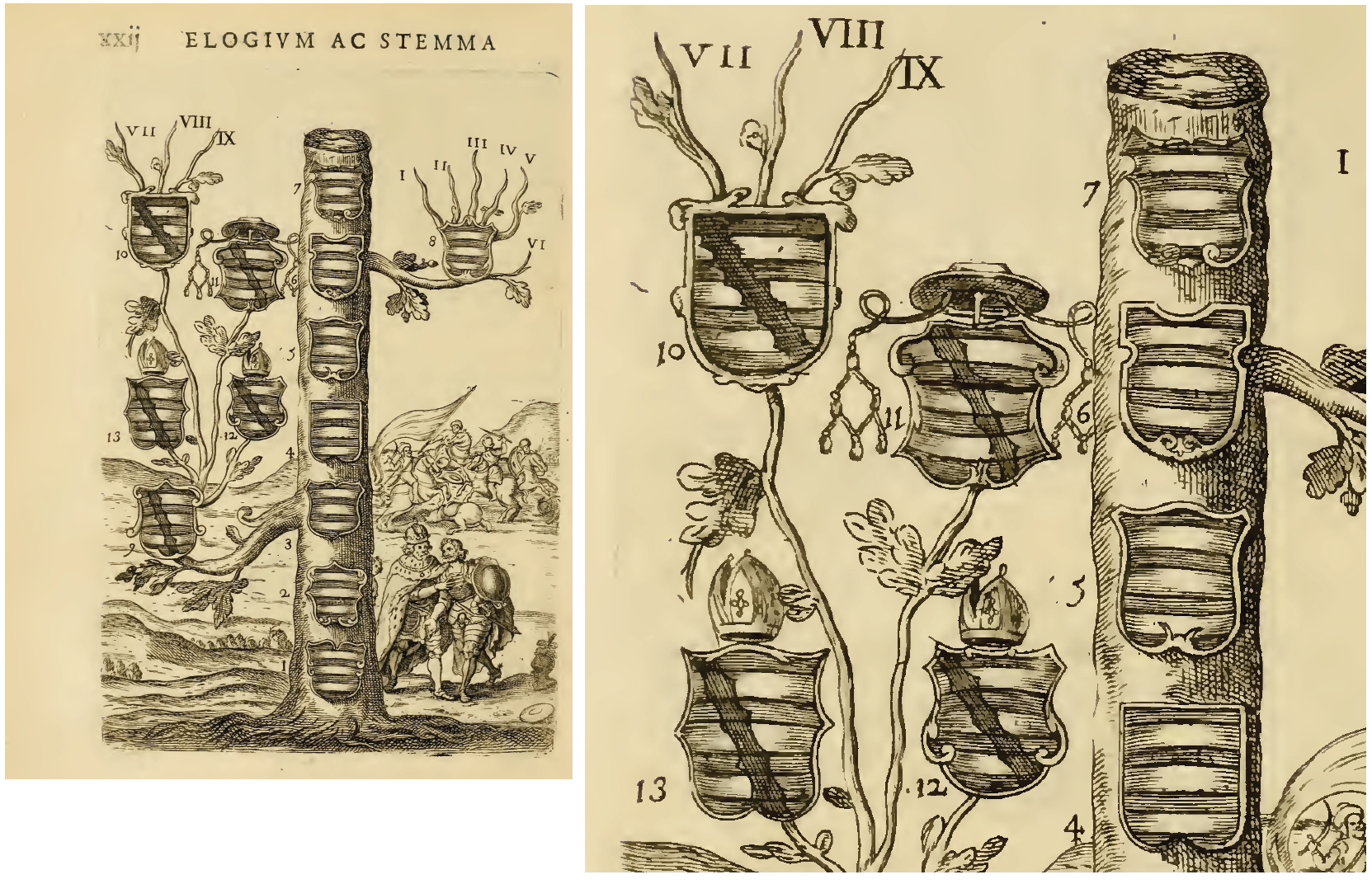
The Carafa genealogy (De symbolis heroicis, 1634) with screening, not heraldic hatching at the escutcheons

Silvester Petra Sancta (1590, in Rome – 6 May 1647, in Rome) was an Italian Jesuit priest, and heraldist. His name is also spelt as Sylvester Petra Sancta, Petrasancta, in Italian Padre Silvestro da Pietrasanta. Pseudonym: Coelius Servilius

== Biography ==
He was the confessor of the Cardinal Pier Luigi Carafa (1581–1655) from a distinguished Neapolitan family. Between 1624 and 1634, Petra Sancta stayed with Carafa in Cologne where he fought against rising Protestantism through his sermons and religious discussions. He had emblem books published in 1634 and 1638, respectively. He was also Rector of the College of Loreto.

Later he settled in Rome and published his treatise on heraldry there. During the mid-1620s, he published a translation in Liège. and since 1631 he was also the editor of a book published from Antwerp. That means during the late 1620s and the early 1630s he stayed in the Spanish Low Countries and the neighboring territories. In 1634 he published his first book touching the topic of heraldry in Antwerp; but his main heraldic work containing the hatching system was published in 1638 in Rome. In 1643, he was appointed the Apostolic Visitator for the Order of Piarists. As a result of his critical visitation, Pope Innocent X reduced the order in his breve Ea quae pro felice on March 16, 1646, into a secular congregation subordinated to the local bishops. The order was rehabilitated in 1656 and renewed in 1669.

== The dispute between Petra Sancta and de la Colombière ==
Today Petra Sancta is known primarily as the inventor of the modern hatching method in heraldry published in 1638. However, his hatching system is identical with that of de la Colombière from 1639. For this reason, de la Colombière accused Silvester Petra Sancta of copying his method and incorrectly publishing it in his 1638 work, one year before the same hatching system was published by de la Colombière.

Petra Sancta provided preliminary comprehensive studies on his heraldic work in Germany and the Netherlands. It is likely that he was acquainted with the idea of hatching and the earlier existing hatching methods from the Dutch engravers before he developed his own hatching system. His 1638 book is sometimes dated between 1636 and 1638. His earlier work De Symbolis Heroicis, Libri IX (Antverpiae, 1634) already had a hatching table and a description of hatching system, but without any practical use. For example, the gules in the Carafa coat of arms being variably screened by vertical and horizontal lines (modern sable), vertical lines (modern gules), or horizontal lines (modern azure). According to the data from the Plantin-Moretus archive, the book emblems were firstly prepared by artist-engravers in the service of the Jesuits. Between December 1631 and June 1634 these were redone by André Pauwels (Andries Pauli, 1600–1639) for Balthasar Moretus (1574–1641). The allegorical title page of this book was prepared by Rubens where Mercury symbolizes the arts. The explanation on the mentioned engraving is given in page 480 of the book. Petra Sancta characterizes the title page of this book in the conclusion as an expression of the power of emblematic way of illustration. The book also contains the portrait of Carafa, engraved in 1632 by Michel Natalis (Liège, 1610–1668). On the escutcheon of this engraving we can see a kind of a screening or hatching as well.

Thus it's obvious that Petra Sancta got the model for his heraldic hatching system from the illustrators and publishers of his books in the Low Countries. It is possible that these engravers also knew at least two earlier hatching systems by Zangrius in 1600, and Francquart in 1623. The techniques of heraldic hatching might have even been carried forward by the guilds of engravers one after another.

The arms on the title page of one of the Francesco Corbelletti's 1639 publications, i. e. the Rome publisher of Petra Sancta, already represents a complete example of heraldic hatching. That means Corbelletti took over the heraldic hatching system already in the next year after the 1638 system of Petra Sancta appeared. If we consider the time needed to prepare the engravings and the approval by the censor, (Note: See Imprimatur#Catholic Church) Corbelletti must have known the hatching system of Petra Sancta even before 1638.

Aegidius Gelenius was deeply influenced by Petra Sancta; the men met several times in Cologne. Gelenius's hatching system from 1645, however, is identical only at two points with that of Petra Sancta.

== Works ==
- Silvestro Pietrasanta: Iter Fuldense ... Petri Aloysii Carafae ... in quo periocha historiae, visitatio, & reformatio ... abbatiae S. Salvatoris civitatis Fuldensis continetur / Caelius Servilius [i.e. Silvestro Pietrasanta] ... Roberto Canonico patritio Ferrariensi dicat. Leodii, 1627
- Silvester Petrasancta: Silvestri Petrasanctae Romani Soc. Iesv theologi Notae in epistolam Petri Molinaei ad Balzavm, cum responsione ad haereses, errores & calumnias eius, ac vindiciis urbis Romae & Pontificis Romani. Antverpiae, 1634
  The book attacked the Protestant ideas of the French Huguenot theologian Pierre Du Moulin (1568–1658) and the French writer Jean-Louis Guez de Balzac (1594–1654).
  - Silvestro Petrasancta: De symbolis heroicis libri IX. Antverpiae, 1634
- Siluestri à Petrasancta: Symbola heroica. Amsterdami, 1682
- Pietrasanta, Silvestro: Oratio funebris ... habita ad Urbanum VIII ... dum iusta exequiarum Ferdinando II. austriaco electo imperatori persolverentur. Romae, typis F. Corbelletti, 1637
  - The title of his 1638 book: Tesserae gentilitiae / a Silvestro Petra Sancta Romano Societatis Iesu ex legibus Fecialium descriptae. – Romae : typis haered[um] Francisci Corbelletti, 1638 (Note générale : Fig. coloriées pour la plus grande partie. -Note générale : Superbe ordinaire "avec figures à chaque page" table des noms de famille à la fin.)
  - The title from the catalogues of Bibliothèque nationale de France (BnF): Pietra Santa, Silvestro (S.J., pseud. Coelius Servilius, Le P.)
- Tesserae gentilitiae a Silvestro Petra Sancta,... ex legibus fecialium descriptae. - Romae : F. Corbelletti, 1638. - In-fol., pièces limin., 678 p., index, errata et vocabulaire, titre gr., portrait de Taddeo Barberini, armoiries et planche.

Published by Francesco Corbelletti.

- According to the catalogue of the Hungarian Jesuit libraries, at the end of his life he published another work titled, P. Syluestri Petra Sancta, Thaumasiae Verae religionis Tomus I. Romae 1643. (In 4to membrana alba. Eiusdem tomus 2us Romae 1646. in 4to membrana alba et margine albo ut prior.)

== See also ==
- Jan Baptist Zangrius
