= Benito Arias Montano =

Spanish orientalist, editor and polymath (1527–1598)

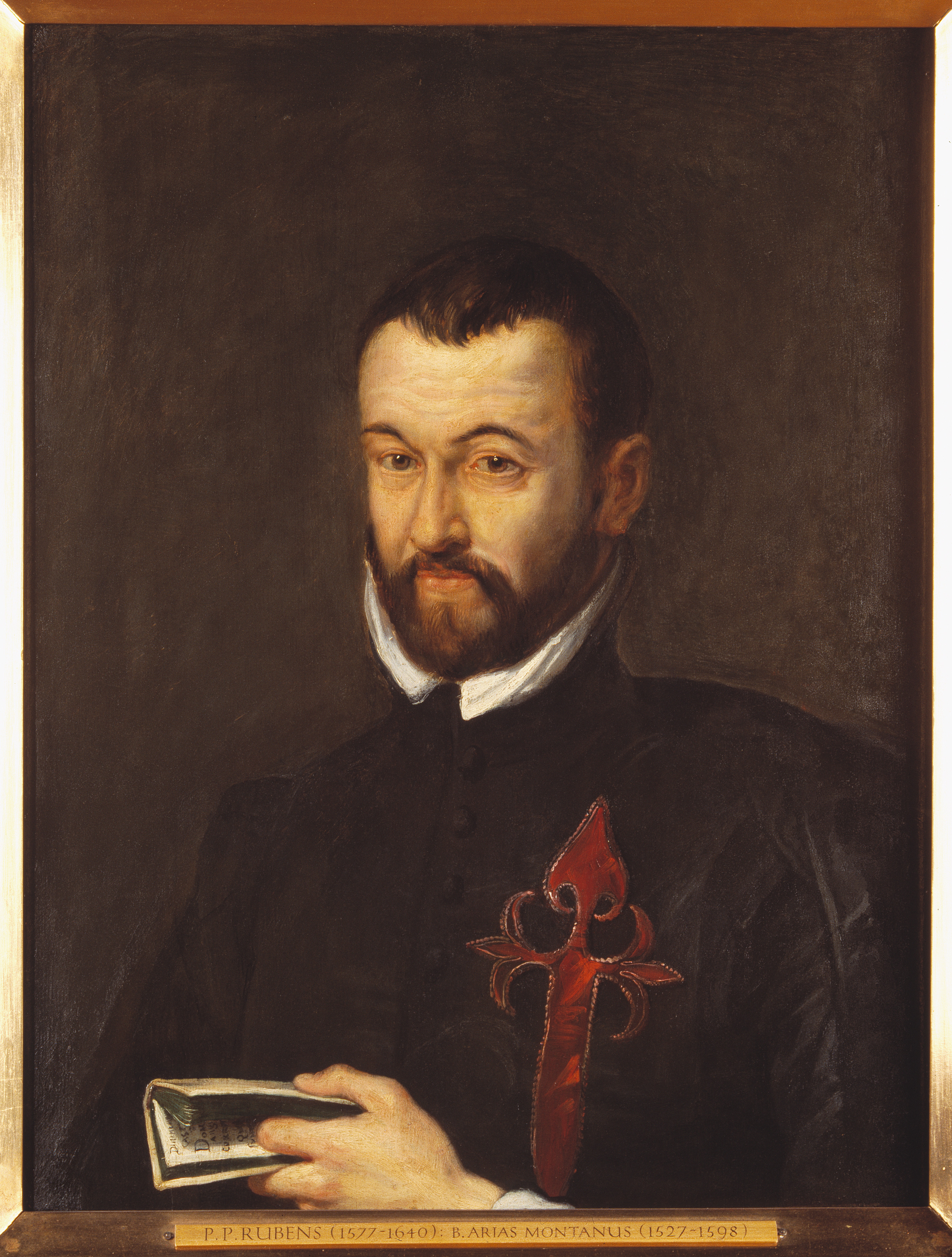
- Portrait of Benito Arias Montano, by Rubens
- Born: Benedictus Arias Montanus; 1527; Fregenal de la Sierra, Extremadura, Spain
- Died: 1598 (71 years); Seville, Spain
- Resting place: Iglesia del Priorato de Santiago de la Espada, Seville
- Education: Universities of Seville and Alcalá
- Known for: Scholar, writer
- Movement: Orientalist

Benito Arias Montano (or Benedictus Arias Montanus; 1527–1598) was a Spanish orientalist and polymath who was active mostly in Spain. He was also editor of the Antwerp Polyglot. He reached the high rank of Royal Chaplain to King Philip II of Spain. His work was censured by the Spanish Inquisition when rabbinical references were included into his Antwerp Polyglot Bible.

== Biography ==
He was born at Fregenal de la Sierra, in Extremadura, and died at Seville. After studying at the universities of Seville and Alcalá, he took orders about the year 1559. He became a clerical member of the Military Order of St. James, and accompanied the Bishop of Segovia to the Council of Trent (1562) where he won great distinction.

On his return, he retired to a hermitage at Aracena whence he was summoned by King Philip II of Spain (1568) to supervise a new polyglot edition of the Bible, with the collaboration of many learned men. The work was issued from the Plantin Press (1572, 8 volumes) under the title Biblia sacra hebraice chaldaice, graece et latine, Philippi II regis catholici pietate et studio ad sacrosanctae Ecclesiae usum, several volumes being devoted to a scholarly apparatus biblicus. Arias was responsible for a large part of the actual matter, besides the general superintendence, and in obedience to the command of the king took the work to Rome for the approbation of Pope Gregory XIII.

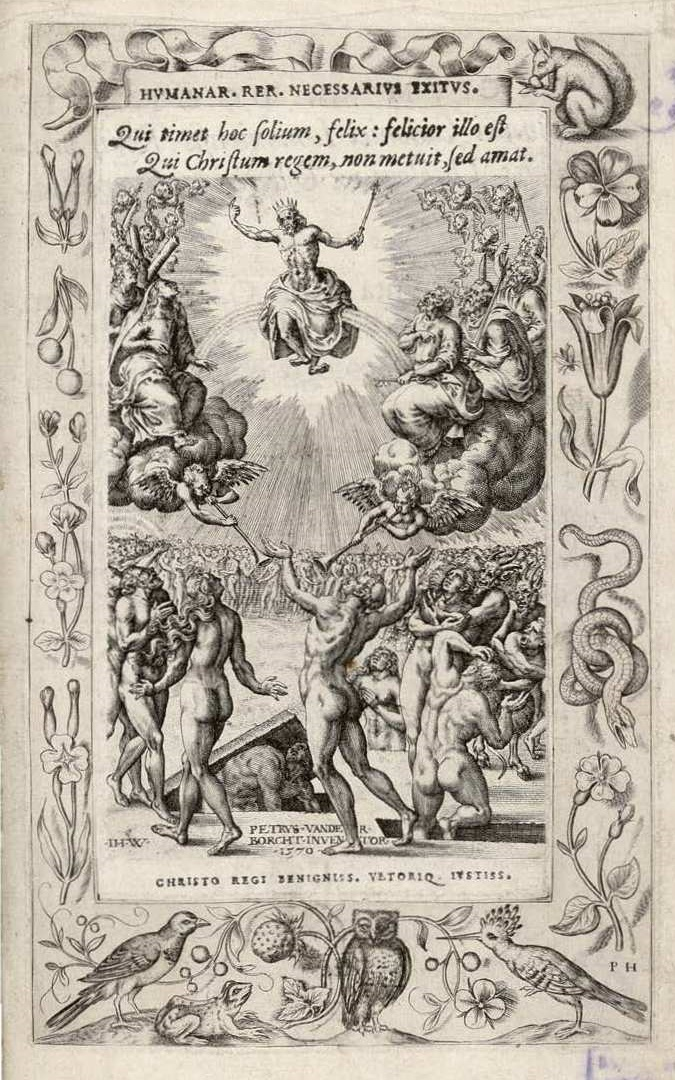
Final Judgement by Johannes Wierix, illustration of the 'Humanae Salutis Monumenta' (1571)

León de Castro, professor of Semitic languages at Salamanca, to whose translation of the Vulgate Arias had opposed the original Hebrew text, denounced Arias to the Roman, and later to the Spanish Inquisition for having altered the Biblical text, making too liberal use of the rabbinical writings, in disregard of the decree of the Council of Trent concerning the authenticity of the Vulgate, and confirming the Jews in their beliefs by his Chaldaic paraphrases. After several journeys to Rome Arias was freed of the charges (1580) and returned to his hermitage, refusing the episcopal honours offered him by the king. He accepted, however, the post of a royal chaplain, but was only induced to leave his retirement for the purpose of superintending the Escorial library and of teaching Semitic languages.

He designed a world map which was included into his Antwerp Polyglot Bible which included texts in Greek, Latin and Hebrew. The map was influential in the history of Cartography as one of the first maps to include Tierra del Fuego as an island on South America.

Montano led the life of an ascetic, dividing his time between prayer and study. In addition to the works written in connection with the polyglot, the most celebrated of which is Antiquitatum judaicarum libri IX (Leyden, 1593), Arias left many commentaries on various books of the Bible; also: Humanae salutis monumenta (Antwerp, 1571); a Latin translation of the Itinerary of Benjamin of Tudela, and other works on widely varying subjects. He was also celebrated as a poet, his verses being chiefly of a religious nature.

== See also ==
- History of theology
- Orientalism

== Sources ==
- Rekers, B., Benito Arias Montano (1527–1598). Studies of the Warburg Institute, 33. London: Warburg Institute, University of London, 1972.
