= Jan Moretus =

Flemish printer

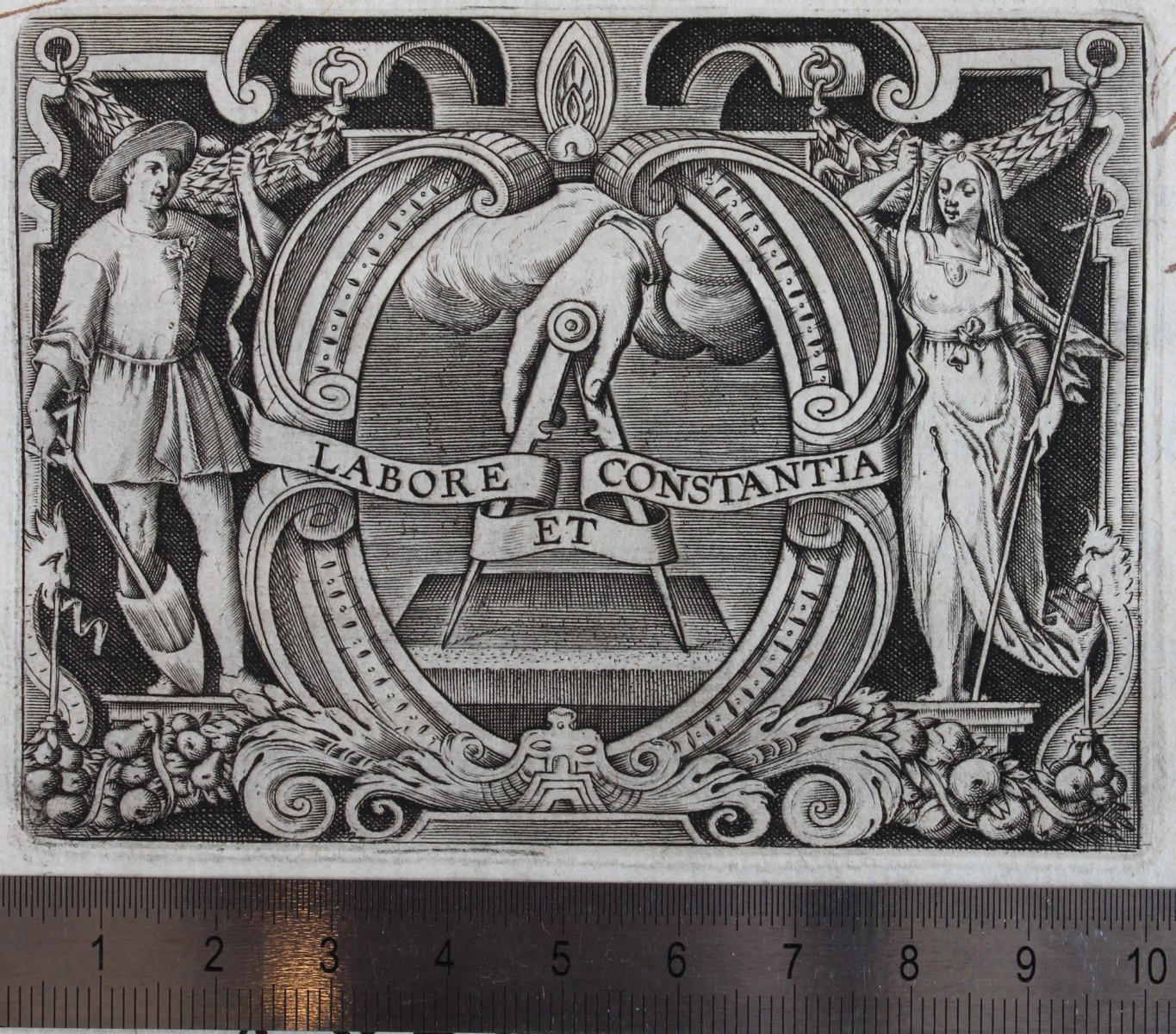
Printer's mark of Jan I Moretus, found in Henricus Sedvlius, Præscriptiones adversvs hæreses (1606), Openbare Bibliotheek Brugge 1875a (f. *1 recto)

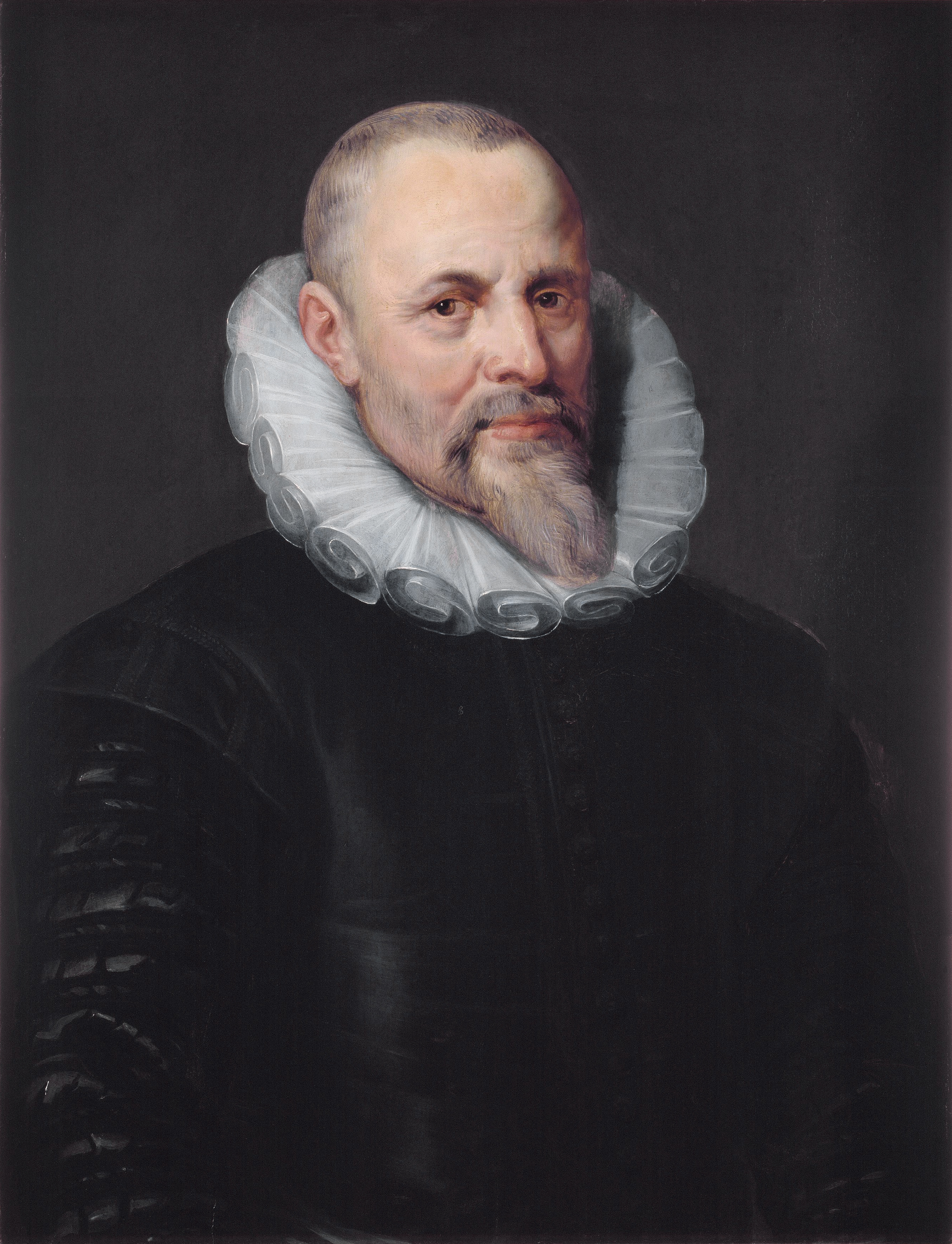
Jan Moretus, portrait by Peter Paul Rubens

Jan Moretus, also John Moerentorf or Joannes Moretus (2 May 1543 – 22 September 1610), was a Flemish printer who was an apprentice for Christophe Plantin, married his daughter, and later inherited the printing business on his father-in-law's death.

== Biography ==
Moretus was born in Antwerp, the son of satin-weaver Jacob Mourentorf and Adriana Gras, daughter of Pieter Gras, a silk-weaver from Milan. He began working for publisher Christophe Plantin in 1557, when he was 14 years of age. He worked in Venice, starting around 1562 to 1563, and then returned to Plantin's business in Antwerp by 1565. In 1570, he married Martina Plantin, the second daughter of the publisher. Christophe wrote a letter on 5 November 1570 to Gabriel de Çayas (secretary to Philip II of Spain) about his new son-in-law:

A young man quite expert in and with a good understanding of Greek, Latin, Spanish, Italian, French, German, and Flemish who from the time that your Highness was in this country with His Majesty until now, has always served me in both good and bad times, without abandoning me because of any ill-fortune which overtook me or because of the promises or inducements that others were able to make him, even offering him the richest marriages and rewards such as were not within my power to grant him. For which reason I give her [i.e. Martina] to him, to the great pleasure of all my good Lords, relations and friends who have known this young man while he has been conducting the business of my shop.

After Christophe Plantin's death, Jan Moretus became the owner of the Plantin Press printing company. Under his management, the company focused on 12mo format for text books, doing away with the smaller handbook (enchiridion) favored under his predecessor.

His wife, considered a formidable businesswoman from the wealthy bourgeoisie, ran Plantin Press from 1610 to 1614. Plantin, through her marriage to Moretus, was considered to be the head of the printing dynasty that lasted for more than three centuries. Her sons, Balthasar and Jan, inherited the printing business and bookshop.

== Projects ==
Some of the notable projects published by Moretus include Benito Arias Montano's Anima, an eight-book series detailing the history of humanity from the Creation through its regeneration with Christ's birth. He has also collaborated with theologians in the publication of religious texts. For example, he worked with the Flemish scholar Henricus Sedulius during the publication of Bonaventure's The Life of St. Francis (De vita s. patris Francisci).

Moretus' works and archives are held in the Plantin-Moretus Museum in Antwerp.
