= Plantin–Moretus Museum =

Printing museum in Antwerp, Belgium

Plantin–Moretus House–Workshops–Museum Complex
UNESCO World Heritage Site
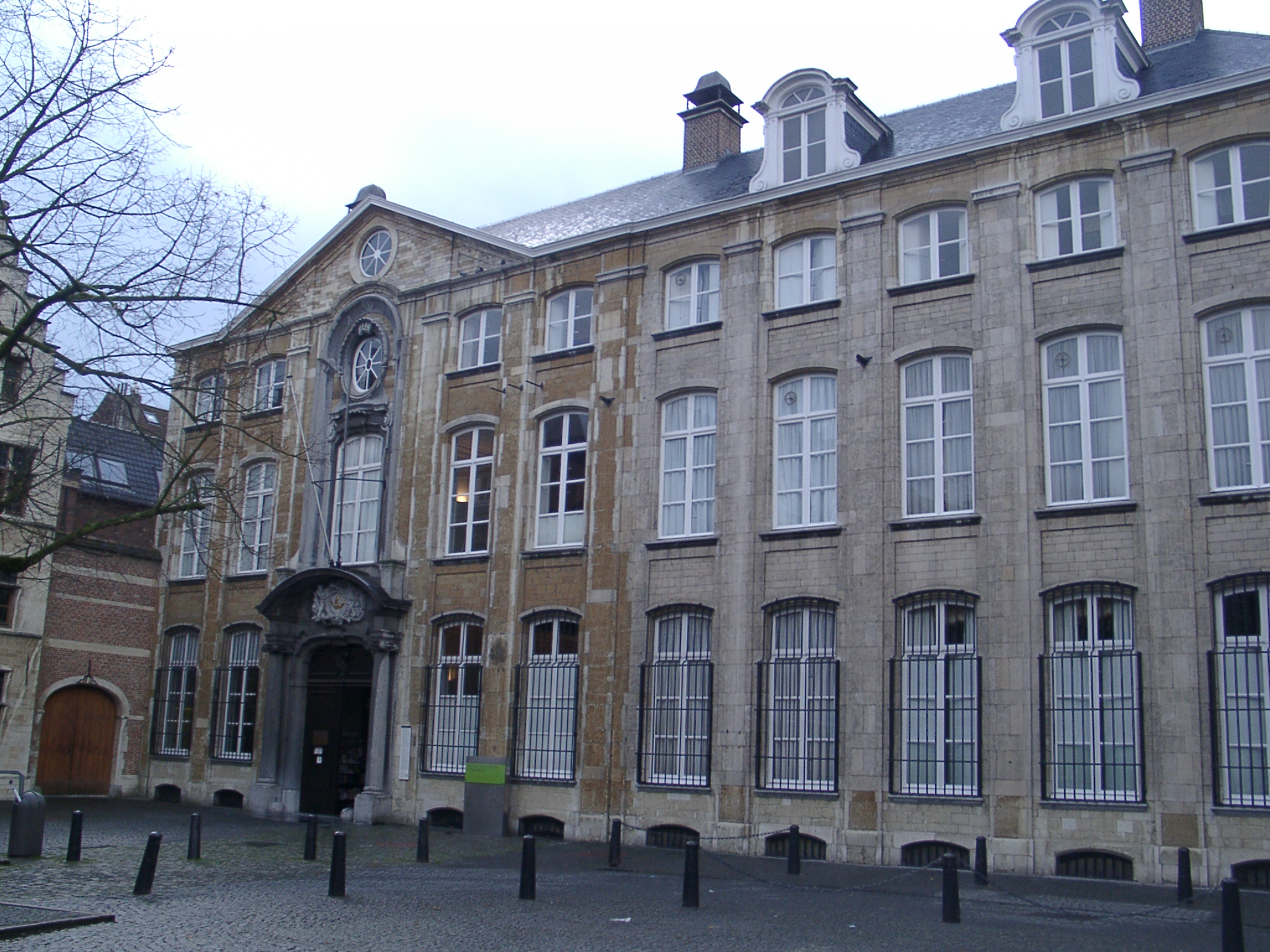
- Exterior of the museum

- Location within Belgium
- Location: Antwerp, Belgium
- Criteria: Cultural: (ii), (iii), (iv), (vi)
- Reference: 1185
- Inscription: 2005 (29th Session)
- Area: 0.23 ha (0.57 acres)
- Buffer zone: 184.1 ha (455 acres)
- Website: www.museumplantinmoretus.be/en
- Coordinates: 51°13′6″N 4°23′52″E

The Plantin–Moretus Museum (Dutch: Plantin-Moretusmuseum) is a museum in Antwerp, Belgium which showcases the history of printing in Antwerp and the prominent role played in that history by the family of printers founded by Christophe Plantin and Jan Moretus in Antwerp in the second half of the 16th century. It is based in a building on the Vrijdagmarkt in Antwerp that served as the residence of the Plantin-Moretus family and the location of the printing company, the Officina Plantina, for four centuries. It is a UNESCO World Heritage Site since 2005.

== History ==
Christophe Plantin, his wife Jeanne Rivière and their first daughter Margaretha moved from France to Antwerp around 1550. Plantin engaged initially in lace trading and the printing business. Due to the success of the latter business, the family moved in 1576 into the building called De Gulden Passer (The Golden Compass) where they also set up their printing press. The print type was sourced from the leading type founders of the day in Paris. The Plantin Press was a major figure in contemporary printing with interests in humanism. His eight-volume, multi-language Plantin Polyglot Bible with Hebrew, Aramaic, Greek and Syriac texts was one of the most complex productions of the period. Plantin is now suspected of being at least connected to members of heretical groups known as the Familists, and this may have led him to spend time in exile in his native France.

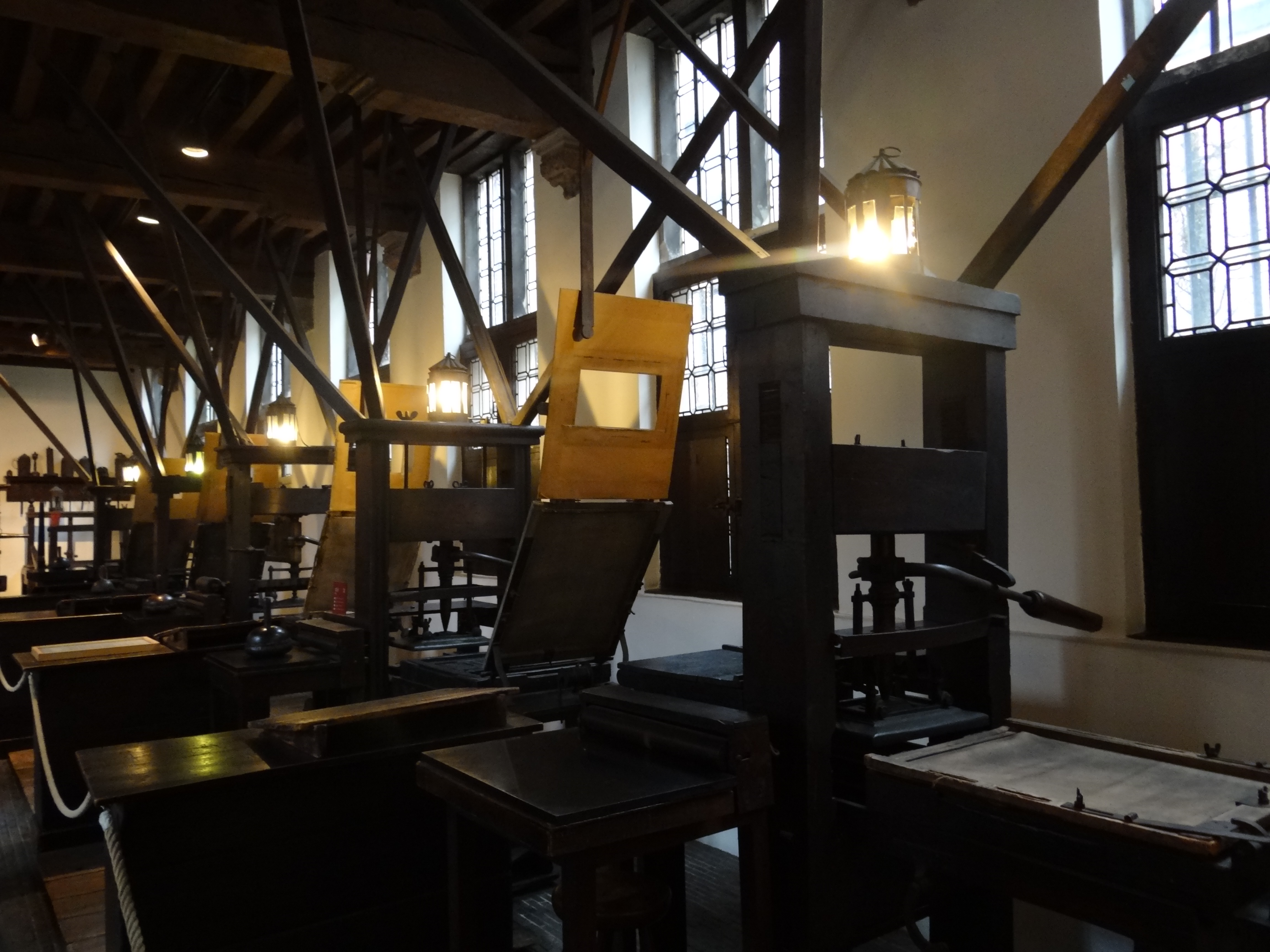
Original printing presses at the museum

After Plantin's death it was owned by his son-in-law Jan Moretus. While most printing concerns disposed of their collections of older type in the eighteenth and nineteenth century in response to changing tastes, the Plantin–Moretus company "piously preserved the collection of its founder."

Four women ran the family-owned Plantin–Moretus printing house (Plantin Press) over the 16th, 17th, and 18th centuries: Martina Plantin, Anna Goos, Anna Maria de Neuf and Maria Theresia Borrekens.

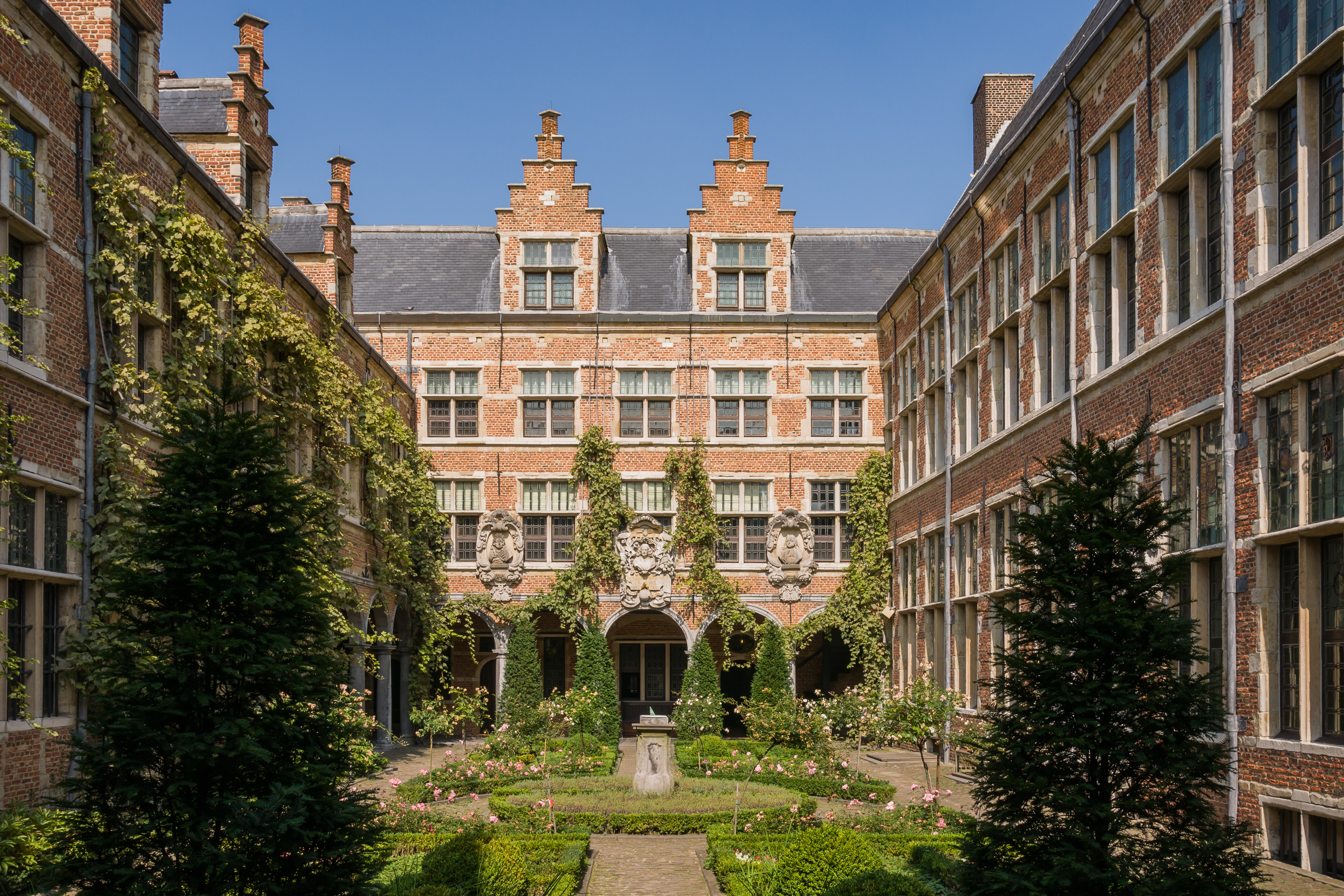
View of the courtyard of the museum

In 1876 Edward Moretus sold the company to the city of Antwerp. One year later the public could visit the living areas and the printing presses. The collection has been used extensively for research, by historians H. D. L. Vervliet, Mike Parker and Harry Carter. Carter's son Matthew would later describe this research as helping to demonstrate "that the finest collection of printing types made in typography's golden age was in perfect condition (some muddle aside) [along with] Plantin's accounts and inventories which names the cutters of his types."

In 2002 the museum was nominated as UNESCO World Heritage Site and in 2005 was inscribed onto the World Heritage list.

The Plantin–Moretus Museum possesses an exceptional collection of typographical material. Not only does it house the two oldest surviving printing presses in the world and complete sets of dies and matrices, it also has an extensive library, a richly decorated interior and the entire archives of the Plantin business, which were inscribed on UNESCO's Memory of the World Programme Register in 2001 in recognition of their historical significance. At the end of September 2016, the museum reopened after a thorough renovation and with a new building (with reading room and paper heritage depot) opening onto Holy Ghost Street. The facade of this reading room refers to a letterbox.

== Collection ==
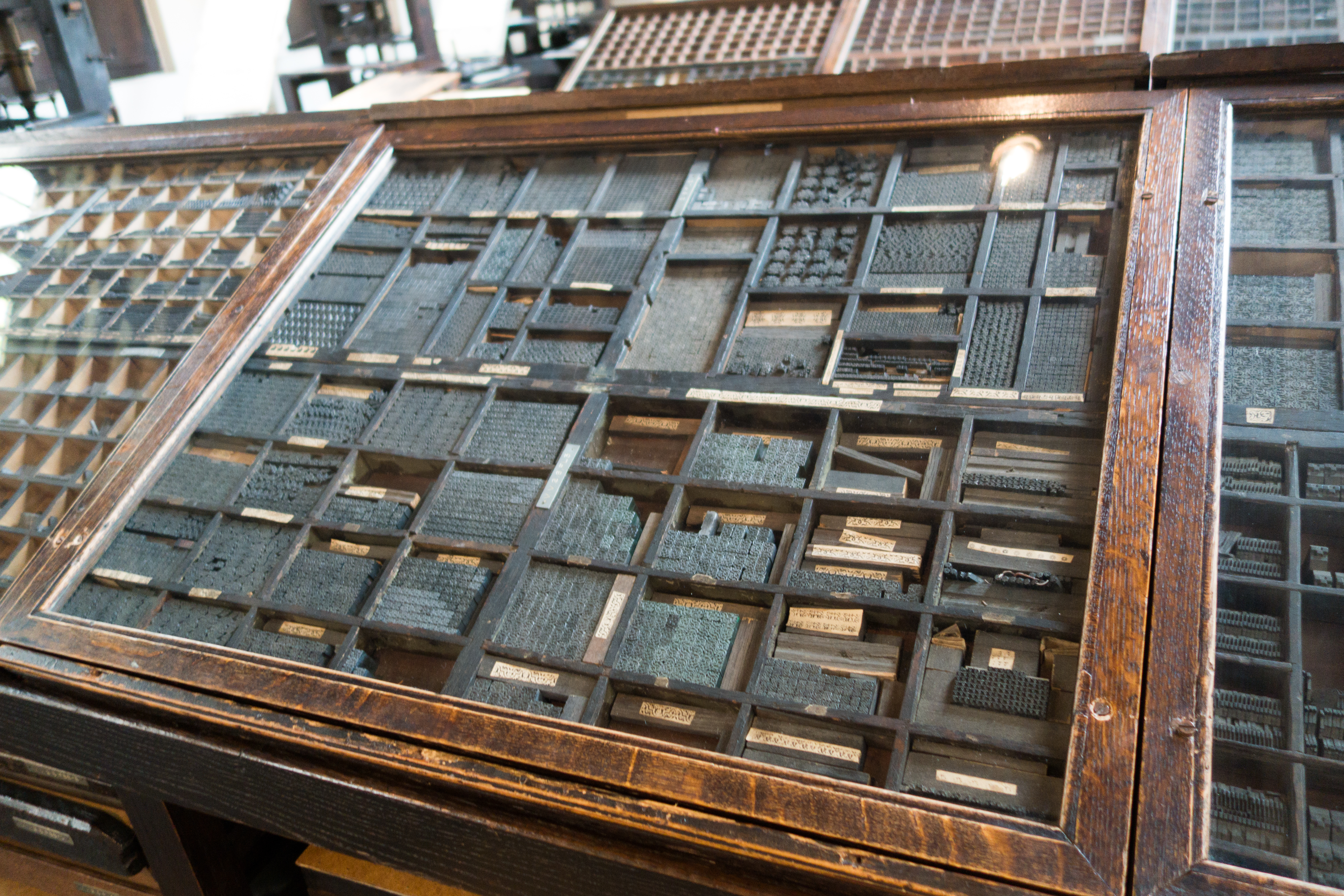
Lead type case

- a Bible in five languages: Biblia Polyglotta (1568-1573)
- Thesaurus Teutoniae Linguae by Cornelis Kiliaan
- a geographical book: Theatrum Orbis Terrarum made by Abraham Ortelius
- a book describing herbs: Cruydeboeck made by Rembert Dodoens
- an anatomical book made by Andreas Vesalius and Joannes Valverde
- a book about decimal numbers from Simon Stevin
- a 36-line Gutenberg Bible
- paintings and drawings by Peter Paul Rubens
- the study of humanist Justus Lipsius and many of his works
- some of the materials used by French type designer and printer Robert Granjon

== See also ==
- List of museums in Belgium
- Renaissance humanism in Northern Europe
- Max Rooses

== Bibliography ==
- Voet, Leon (1969), The Golden Compasses: a history and evaluation of the printing and publishing activities of the Officina Plantiniana at Antwerp. Vol. 1, Christopher Plantin and the Moretuses: their lives and their world, Amsterdam: Vangendt & Co. London: Routledge & Kegan Paul, ISBN 0710064667
- Voet, Leon; Kaye, Raymond H. (1972), The Golden Compasses: a history and evaluation of the printing and publishing activities of the Officina Plantiniana at Antwerp. Vol.2 The management of a printing and publishing house in Renaissance and Baroque, Amsterdam: Vangendt & Co. London: Routledge & Kegan Paul, ISBN 0839000049
