= Plantin Polyglot =

16th-century polyglot Bible printed in Antwerp

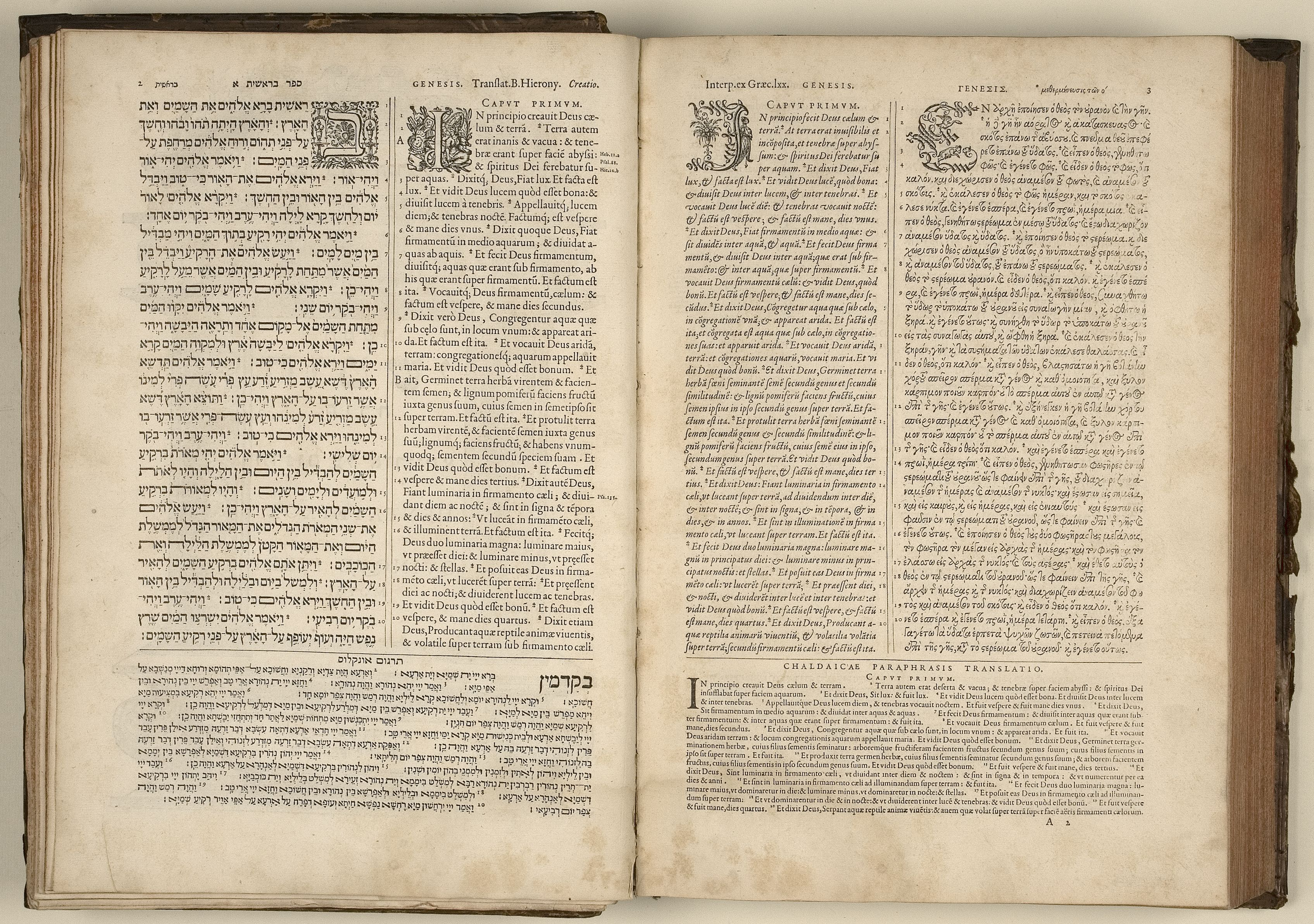
Polyglot, Genesis

The Plantin Polyglot (also called the Antwerp Polyglot, the Biblia Regia or "King's Bible") is a polyglot Bible, printed under the title Biblia Polyglotta by Christopher Plantin in Antwerp (Belgium) between 1568 and 1573.

== History ==
Plantin was suspected of Calvinist sympathies, although Antwerp at that time was firmly Catholic. He developed a plan to prove his loyalty to the Catholic king Philip II of Spain by producing a polyglot version of the Bible, in five languages. The king promised to finance the project — completing it nearly bankrupted Plantin — and sent the Spanish theologian Benito Arias Montano to Antwerp to watch over the production of this eight-volume of printing, which was printed in 1,200 copies on paper and 12 copies on parchment. Printing the Bible required thirteen printing presses and fifty-five men to run them, as well as expert linguists who acted as proofreaders.

== Description ==
The first four volumes contain the Old Testament. The left page has two columns with the Hebrew original and the Latin translation, the right page has same text in Greek with its own Latin translation. Underneath these columns there is an Aramaic version on the left-hand page and a Latin translation of this on the right-hand side. For printing the Hebrew text Plantin used among others Daniel Bomberg's Hebrew type, which he had received from Bomberg's nephews. Volume 5 contains the New Testament in Greek and Syriac, each with a Latin translation, and a translation of the Syriac into Hebrew. Volume 6 has the complete Bible in the original Hebrew and Greek, as well as an interlinear version that has the Latin translation printed between the lines. The last two volumes contain dictionaries (Hebrew-Latin, Greek-Latin, Syriac-Aramaic, grammar rules, list of names, etc.) that were of value to scholars. A complete copy of this Bible is on display at the Plantin-Moretus Museum (the site of the original printing press), including the typefaces used on the project.
