= Plantin Press =

Coordinates: 51.21829°N 4.39816°E

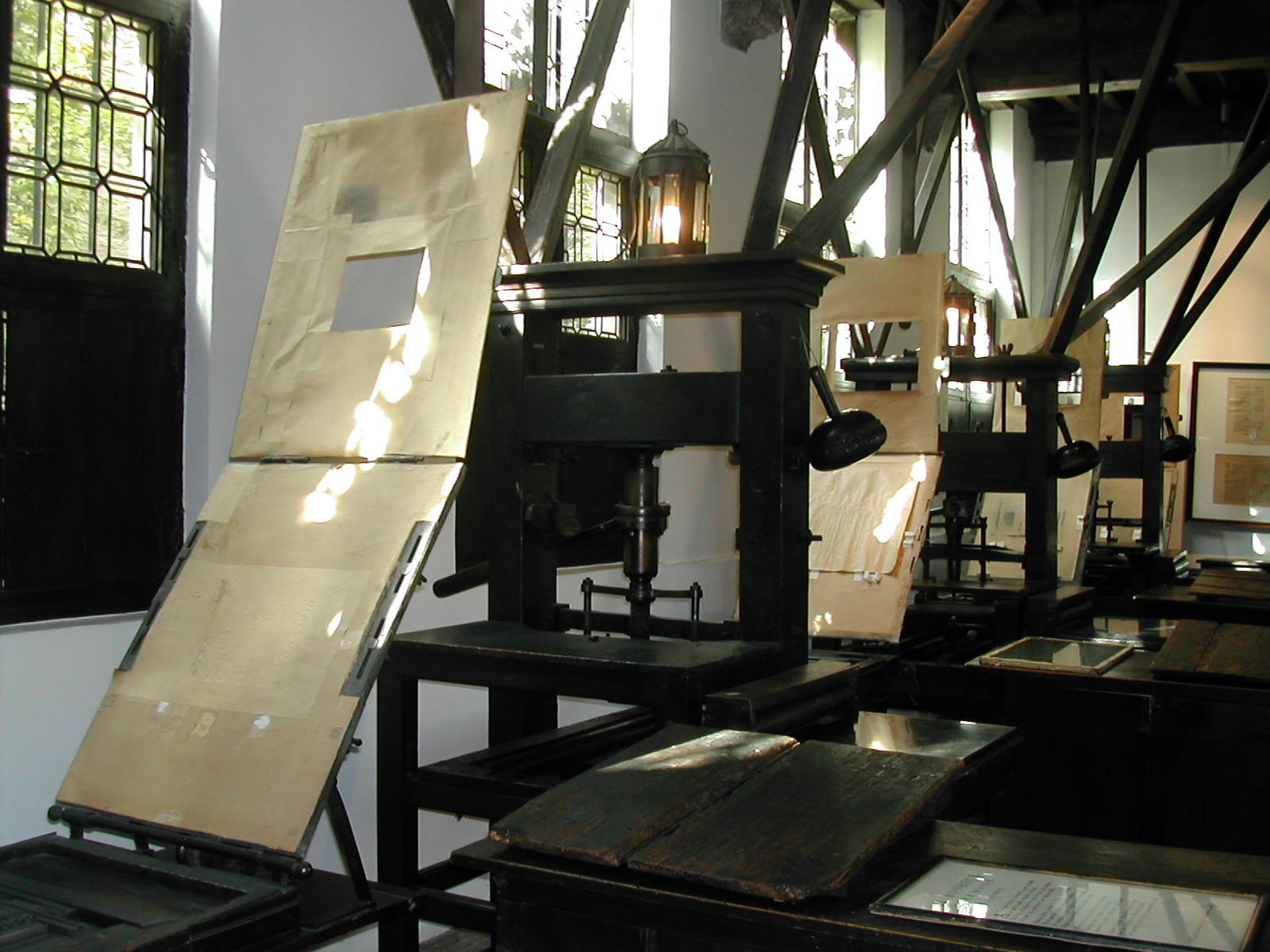
Printing room of the Plantin-Moretus museum

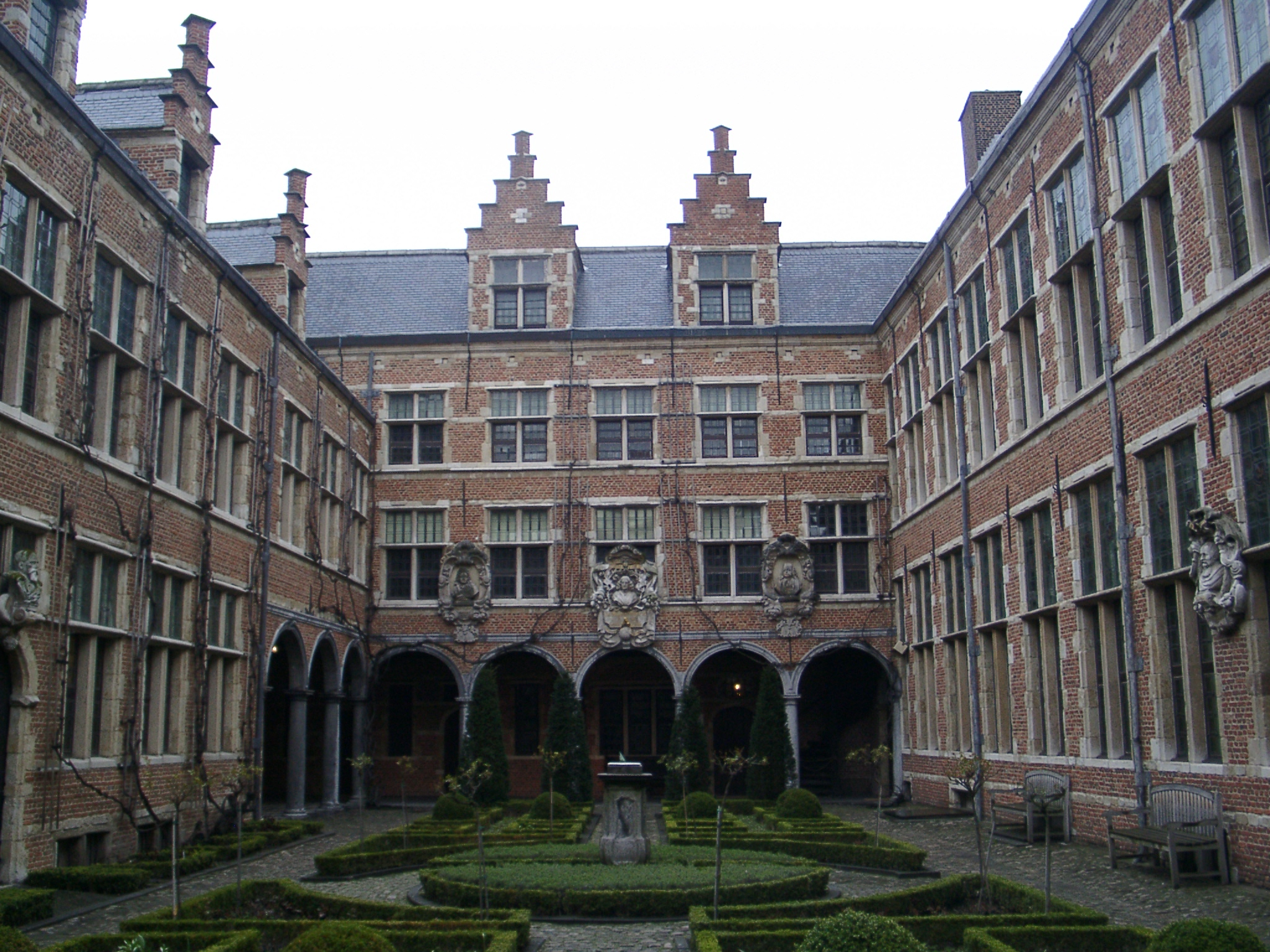
Their building is still extant and houses a museum

The Plantin Press at Antwerp was one of the focal centers of the fine printed book in the 16th century.

== History ==
Christophe Plantin (c. 1520–1589) of Touraine was trained as a bookbinder. He fled from Paris where at least one printer had recently been burned at the stake for heresy, and went to Antwerp. There he bound books, became a citizen, and by 1555 began to print books, at first for distribution by other publishers. The city was already an established center of printing woodcuts, engravings and books. Plantin took on an assistant, Jan Moretus (Moerentorf), who read Latin and Greek and could write correspondence in several modern languages. He became Plantin's business manager, son-in-law and eventually his successor in the Plantin printing press. For over two hundred years the Plantin press had a monopoly, granted by the papacy, for the printing of liturgical formularies, including in Spain. In 1562, suspected of heresy, Plantin fled to France for two years. At an auction of his press, friends bought up his equipment on his behalf.

After 1564, when Plantin set up again in a new shop at the sign of De Gulden Passer ("The Golden Compasses"), the printers mark of the House of Plantin. It often appeared in a vignette on the title page of books from the press, depicting a compass, angels, and the motto Labore et Constantia ("By Labor and Constancy") which epitomizes the life of the publisher. From about 1570 Plantin employed the engravers Jan Wierix and his brother Hieronymus.

Plantin's successors continued the print at Antwerp until 1867.

== Today ==
The building that housed the press is now the Plantin-Moretus Museum. It maintains a collection of printing tools and around 25,000 volumes related to the press. In 2001, the archives of Plantin Press were added to UNESCO's Memory of the World Register.

== Works ==
Like the printer Robert Estienne, Plantin exposed galley proofs of his works in front of his establishment and promised a reward to anyone who could find faults. Later Plantins were friends of the painter Peter Paul Rubens who did drawings for illustrations and also some portraits of the Plantin-Moretus family. Plantin was also a member of the Family of Love. He was a close friend of cartographer Abraham Ortel (a.k.a. Ortelius), genre painter Brueghel the Elder, and calligraphy master Clement Perret.

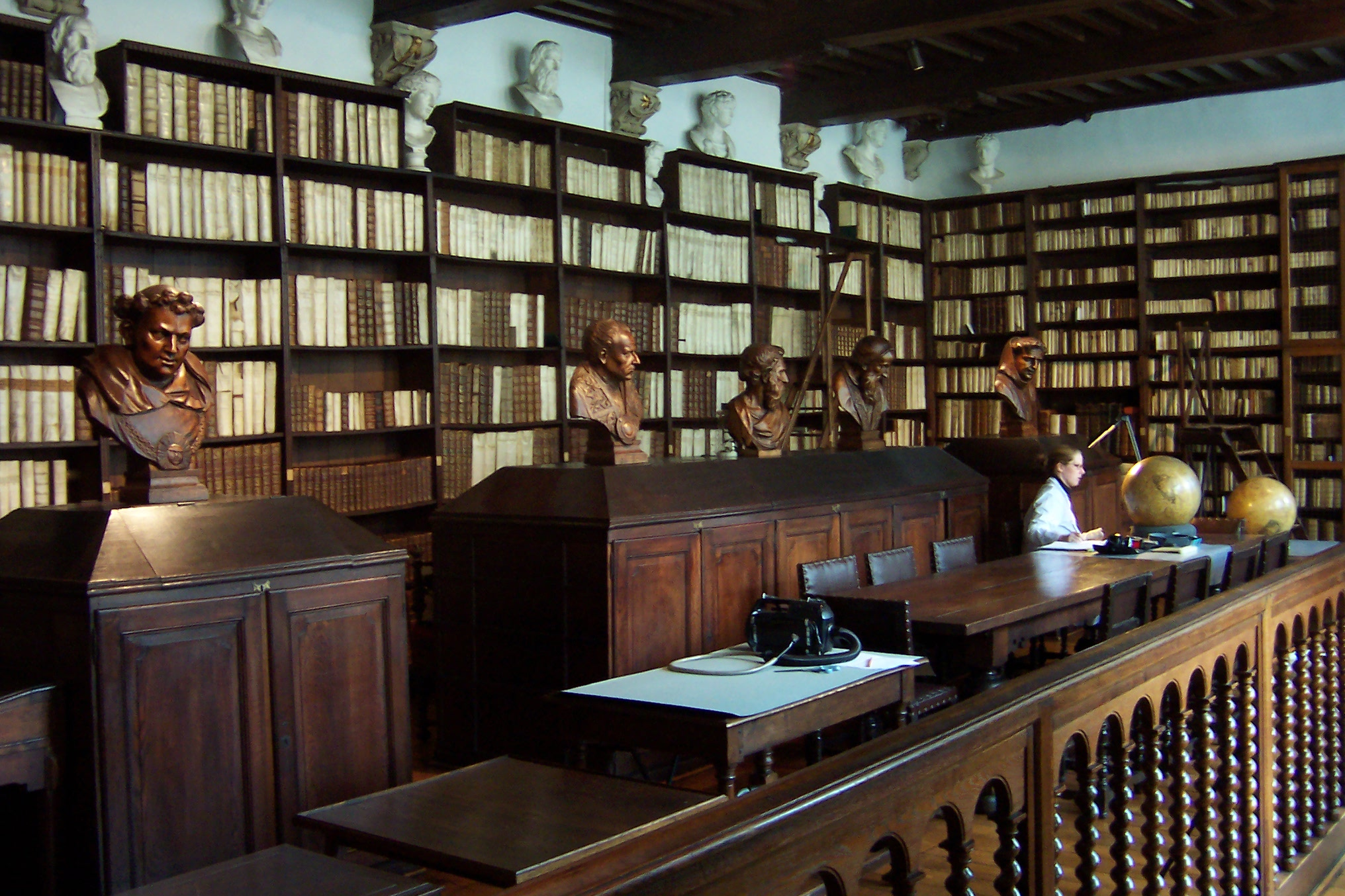
Museum Library

Some outstanding books published by the Plantin Press, by year:

- La Institutione di una Fanciulla Nata Nobilmente. L'Institution d'une Jeune Fille de Noble Maison. Traduuite de langue Tuscan en François. Plantin's first printed book, a Tuscan manual on the education of young girls of good family.
- (an album of plates commemorating the funeral of the Emperor Charles V, 1559)
- Dictionarium Tetraglotton 1562. a dictionary in Greek, Latin, French and Flemish
- The Biblia Polyglotta, a Polyglot Bible, 1572. Plantin's most famous project, in preparation since 1567, a bible in eight folio volumes, in Hebrew, Latin, Greek, Syriac and Aramaic.
- Abraham Ortelius, Theatrum orbis terrarum 1584 and 1598 (first published 1570)
  - Theatrum orbis terrarum
- Henricus Sedulius, Apologeticus adversus Alcoranum Franciscanorum pro libro Conformitatum (Antwerp, 1607). An apology of the Franciscan order in response to Erasmus Alberus's Alcoranus Franciscanorum.
