= List of women printers and publishers before 1800 =

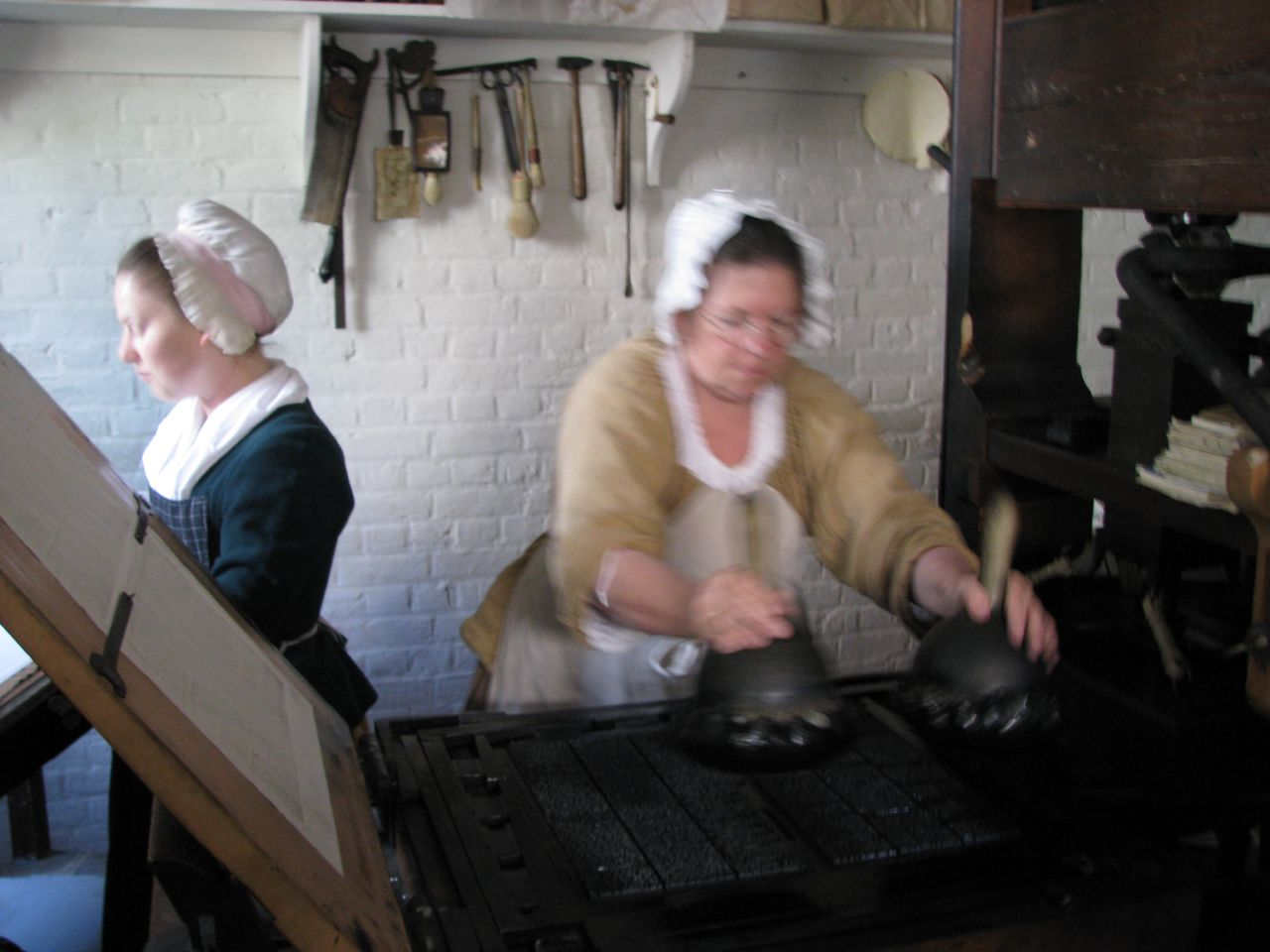
Reenactment of printing newspapers in 18th-century colonial America

This list of women printers and publishers before 1800 includes women active as printers or publishers prior to the 19th century. Before the printing press was invented, books were made from pages written by scribes, and it could take up to a year or two for a book to be completed. Books were a luxury mainly for religious scholars and the upper classes. Johannes Guttenberg invented the printing press around 1450, which allowed for mass production of books. Having books become more widely available meant that a wider range of people had access to information, but this threatened the authority of the state. Some printers had their works censored and may have been jailed for disseminating information of which the state did not approve.

Printing required setting type and running the press itself, which could be arduous, as well as bookbinding. Although running the press was considered too physically difficult, many women were able to do all the jobs required to produce a book. Generally, women learned the trade from their fathers or husbands. From the mid-1500s to the mid-1600s, women made up 10% of the printing workforce in London.

Prior to the abolition of the guild system in 19th-century Europe, the most common way for a woman to become a businesswoman was to inherit a business and profession from her late husband, as the guild privilege was by custom granted to the widow of a guild member. This was often the case in regard to women printers and publishers prior to the 19th century.

The list is sorted chronologically, by country:

== Belgium (The Austrian Netherlands) ==
Present-day Belgium was among the Low Countries of western Europe, which by the 16th century were "highly urbanized, literate, and cosmopolitan". Collectively known as 'Nederlanders", they shared common cultural roots, including ensuring that they had legal property and contractual rights. During the 16th and 17th centuries, there was significant growth in burgeoning fields, such as art and literature, which provided opportunities for women in the cities. In particular, four women printers ran the family-owned Plantin-Moretus printing house (Plantin Press) over the 16th, 17th, and 18th centuries: Martina Plantin, Anna Goos, Anna Maria de Neuf and Maria Theresia Borrekens. According to the Plantin-Moretus Museum, they were largely responsible for company's longevity, and continuity.

Leon Voet, notes that Martina Plantin and her sisters were not isolated cases, and states that "sixteenth-century Italian and Spanish travelers, accustomed to a world where women were barred from public life, repeatedly expressed amazement – and often indignation – in their accounts of the Netherlands at the extensive participation of women and girls in economic activities and their free and easy bearing in public."

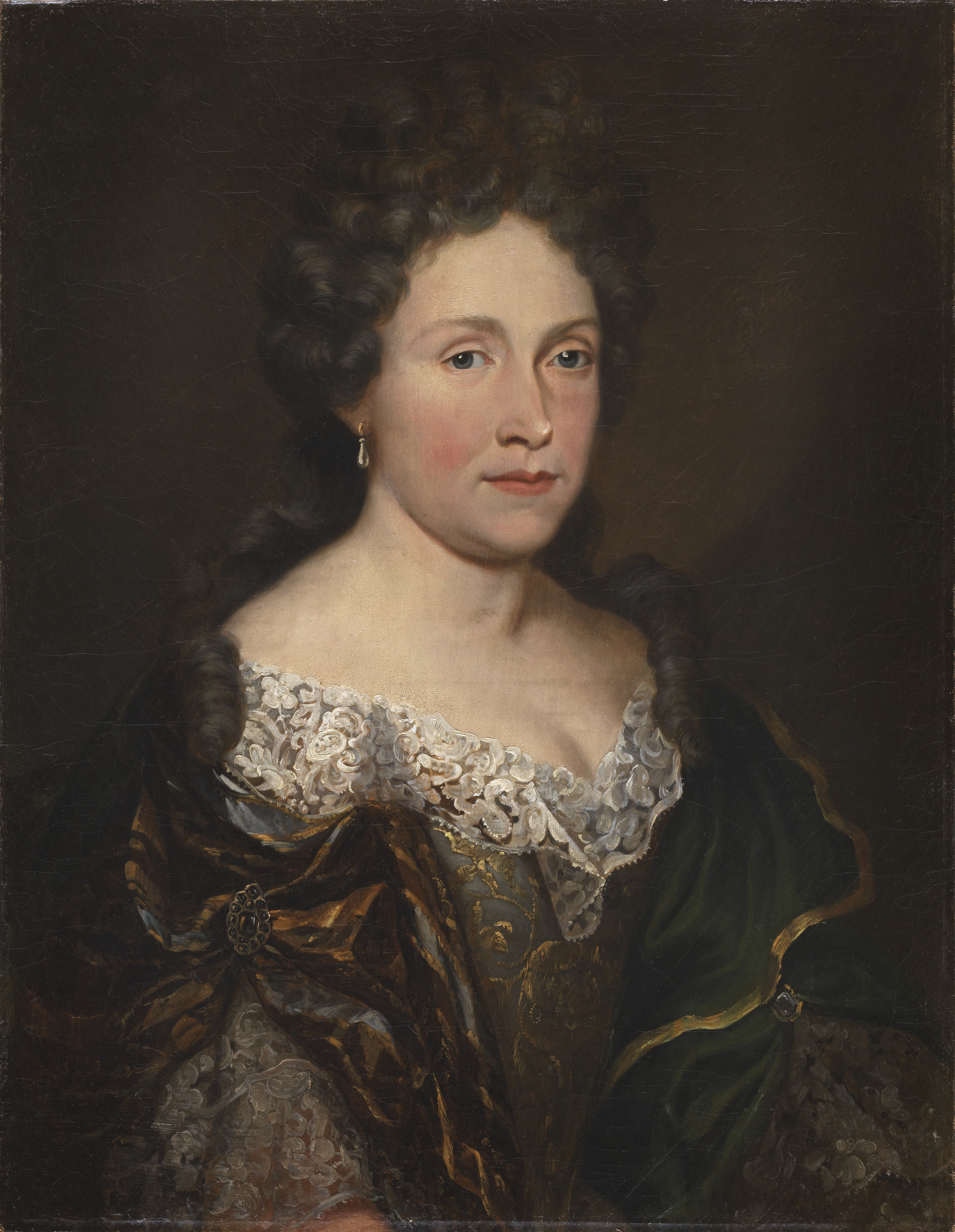
Anna Maria de Neuf, between 1680 and 1699, Plantin-Moretus Museum

- Volcxken Diericx (c. 1525 – 1600) was a Flemish print maker and publisher.
- Martina Plantin (1550–1616) was a printer. At the age of seventeen, she ran the family's lace business and continued to run it after her marriage. She married printer Jan Moretus, and she ran Plantin Press in Antwerp from 1610 to 1614. She is said to have been the head of the Plantin-Moretus printing dynasty.
- Anna Goos (1627–1691) was a printer. She was the co-manager of the Plantin Press in Antwerp from 1673 to 1681. She was the widow of Balthasar II Moretus, and the co-manager of the Plantin Press with her son Balthasar III Moretus.
- Anna Maria de Neuf (1654–1714) was a printer and the manager of the Plantin Press in Antwerp from 1696 to 1714.
- Maria Theresia Borrekens (1728–1797) ran the Plantin Press in Antwerp from 1765 to 1797, following the death of her husband Franciscus Joannes Moretus.

== Bohemia ==
- Gutel Kohen of Prague (fl. 1627) was a Jewish-Bohemian printer, active in Prague. She was the daughter of the printer Judah ben Alexander Kohen, who was known as Löb Setzer. A great deal of importance was placed on education within Jewish culture, and many of early printing presses produced Hebrew books. Prague became a center for the publication of Hebrew books, starting with Gershom ben Solomon Kohen, who was the head of the generations of printers.

== Denmark ==
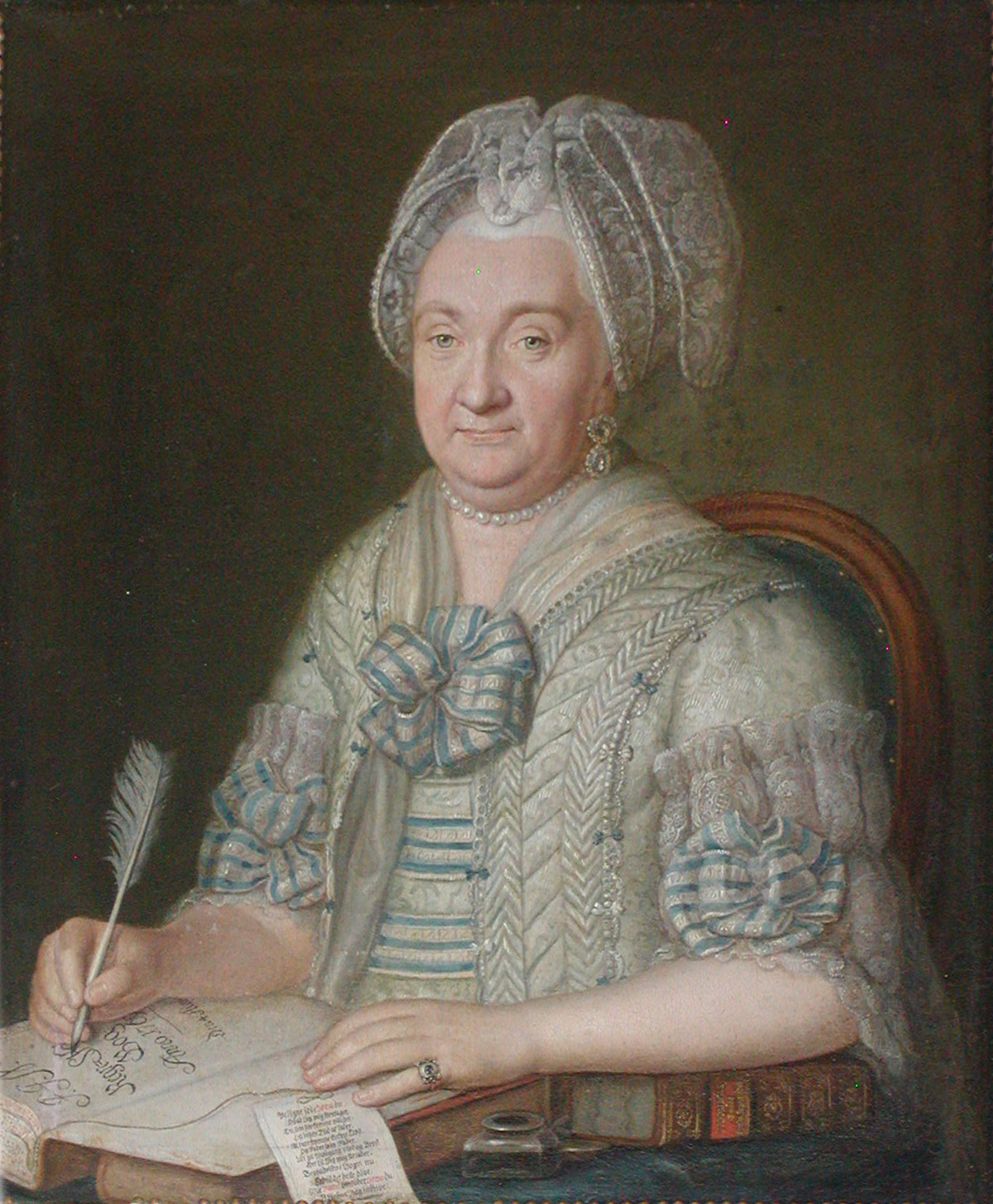
Ulrich Ferdinand Beenfeldt, Portrait of Anna Magdalena Godiche, 1776, Natural History Museum of Denmark

- Anna Magdalena Godiche née Høpfner (11 January 1721 – 22 February 1781) was a Danish book printer and publisher. She took over the printing business after her husband died in 1769. She owned the monopoly of printing and publishing the sentences of the de facto regent Johann Friedrich Struensee and Enevold Brandt, who were famously executed in 1772. She specialized in historical works, and printed Andreas Bussæus's Frederik 4.s Dagsregistre (1770), Niels Krag's Christian IIIs Historie (1776–79) and Historiske Efterretninger om velfortiente danske Adelsmænd (1777–79) by Tycho de Hofman. She operated the printing business until her death.
- Elisabeth Christine Berling (1744–1801) inherited the printing business from her mother Anna Magdalena Godiche.

== Finland ==
- Catharina Ahlgren (1734 – c. 1800) was a Swedish Proto feminist poet and publisher, and one of the first identifiable female journalists in Sweden. She was the publisher and chief editor of a number of different women's periodicals in Stockholm and in Finland between 1772 and 1783, and the publisher of the first periodical (as well as the first one by a woman) in Finland: Om konsten att rätt behaga (1782).

== France ==
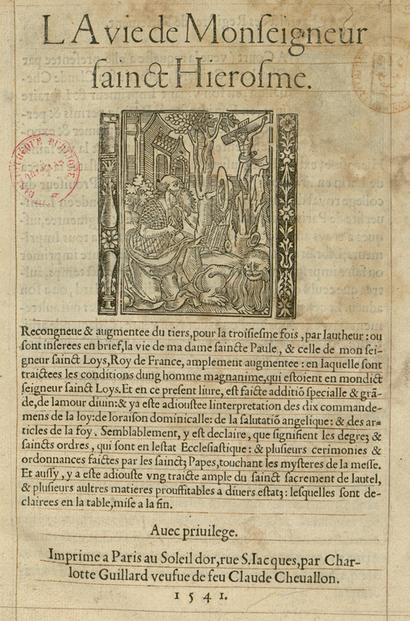
La Vie de monseigneur sainct Hierosme de Louis Lasseré, Charlotte Guillard imprint, 1541

The printing industry was established in France in the 16th century, with Lyon being the first center and later Paris. The names of many widows active in the profession is known from the 16th century, such as Nicole Vostre (fl. 1537), Jeanne Bruneau, and Sibille de La Porte (fl. 1593). In the first half of the 17th century, 208 widow printers and publishers were active in France, and during the 17th century, about 540 widows are estimated to have been active within the publishing, printing and retailing book business in France.

- Yolande Bonhomme (c. 1490–1557) was a French printer and seller of liturgical and devotional books in Paris. She was among a handful of important female book printers in Paris during this time, including Charlotte Guillard, Francoise Louvain, and Marie L'Angelier.
- Charlotte Guillard (before 1502–1557) was the first woman printer of importance. Guillard worked at the noted Soleil d'Or printing house from 1502 until her death. She became one of the most important printers of the Latin Quarter area in the city of Paris. She was officially active with her own imprint during her two widowhood periods.
- Madeleine Boursette (fl. 1540–1555), was a French printer. She managed the printing shop of her late spouse Francois Regnault from 1540 to 1555.
- Louise Giraud (fl. 1544), wife of Étienne Dolet, managed the printing business of her spouse while he was imprisoned for heresy in 1542–1544, and printed at least 13 titles.
- Jeanne de Marnef (fl. 1545–1547), was a French printer. She managed the printing shop of her late spouse Denys Janot, royal printer of French language publications in Paris.
- Jeanne de La Saulcée (died 1559), French book printer, active in Lyon. She managed the printing press and bookselling business after the death of her spouse in 1527.
- Antoinette Peronnet (fl. 1576), was a French printer. She managed the printing shop of her late spouse Gabriel Cotier of Lyons in 1565–1576.
- Jeanne Giunta (fl. 1577–1584) and her sister Jacqueline Giunta were given dispensation by King Henry III of France to manage the printing business empire of their late father Jacques Giunta of Lyons despite this normally being the privilege only of widows, and printed under their maiden names.
- Françoise de Louvain (died 1620) was a French book printer, active in Paris. She managed a printing press and bookselling business after the death of her spouse in 1610.
- Marie-Anne Cellier (fl. 1700) was a French publisher. Widowed after the Dutch-French publisher Daniel Horthemels, she continued his publishing business in Paris after his death in 1691.
- Anne Hussard (circa 1720), known professionally as Veuve Oudot, managed the major publishing and printing business Bibliothèque bleue after the death of her spouse Nicolas Oudot (III).
- Madame de Beaumer (1720–1766), was a French feminist, journalist and editor. She was the director of the women's magazine Journal des dames (1759–78) in 1761–1763.
- Madeleine Fauconnier (1725–1784), was a French journalist and editor. She was the director and chief editor of the Nécrologe of Paris in 1764–1782.
- Marguerite Pagès-Marinier (1725–1786), was a French journalist and editor. She was the director and chief editor of the Annonces, affiches et avis divers de Montpellier of Montpellier in 1770–1776.
- Justine Giroud (1730–1798), was a French journalist and editor. She was the director and chief editor of the Affiches, annonces et avis-divers du Dauphiné of Grenoble in 1774–1792.
- Catherine Michelle de Maisonneuve (est. c. 1730–1774), was a French feminist, journalist and editor. She was the director of the women's magazine Journal des dames (1759–78) in 1763–1766. She developed the magazine into one of the most successful Publications in France at the time, and it became famous for its feminist content.
- Marie-Emilie Maryon de Montanclos (1736–1812), was a French feminist, journalist and editor. She was the director of the women's magazine Journal des dames (1759–78) in 1774–1775.
- Barbe-Therese Marchand (1745 – fl. 1792), was a French journalist and editor. She was the director and chief editor of the Affiches d'Artois of Arras in 1789–1792.
- Louise-Félicité de Kéralio (1757–1821), was a French publisher. On 13 August 1789, she founded le Journal d'État et du Citoyen, thereby becoming the first woman to be editor-in-chief of a journal. Over the next two years, she edited a number of other journals, which were essentially vehicles for her views on society, rights, and the revolution.
- Anne Félicité Colombe (fl. 1793), was a French printer and publisher, and a political activist during the French Revolution. She published the radical journals L'Ami du Peuple and l'Orateur du Peuple.

== Germany ==
- Anna Rügerin (died after 1484), is considered to be the first female typographer to inscribe her name in the colophon of a book, in the 15th century
- Kunegunde Hergot (est. by 1500–died 7 February 1547) was a German printer in Nuremberg and the wife of first Hans Hergot, and later of Georg Wachter, both printers.
- Magdalena Morhart (c. 1505 as Magdalena Kirschmann −1574) was a German printer in Tübingen. She printed nearly 500 titles, including titles for the University and the Württemberg government.
- Margarethe Prüss (d. 1542), was a German printer. She was a printer and as the manager of her late father Johann Prüss I:s printing shop Zum Thiergarten in Strasbourg, and published illegal religious material while managing the shop when her spouse was imprisoned.
- Katharina Gerlachin (also Gerlach, b. c. 1520, d. 1592) was a German printer in Nuremberg. She acted as director of the Berg & Neuber printing house, founded c. 1542 by her husband Johann vom Berg and Ulrich Neuber, from 1564 until her death.
- Rebecca and Rachel Judels of Wilmersdorf (fl. 1677), were two Jewish-German printers, sisters, active in Wilmersdorf.
- Anna Vandenhoeck (1709–1787), was a German printer. She managed the printing shop Vandenhoeck & Ruprecht in Göttingen after the death of her spouse Abraham Vandenhoeck in 1751 to 1787, a printing shop famous for publishing a great number of the well-known literature of the Age of Enlightenment.

== Great Britain ==
=== England ===
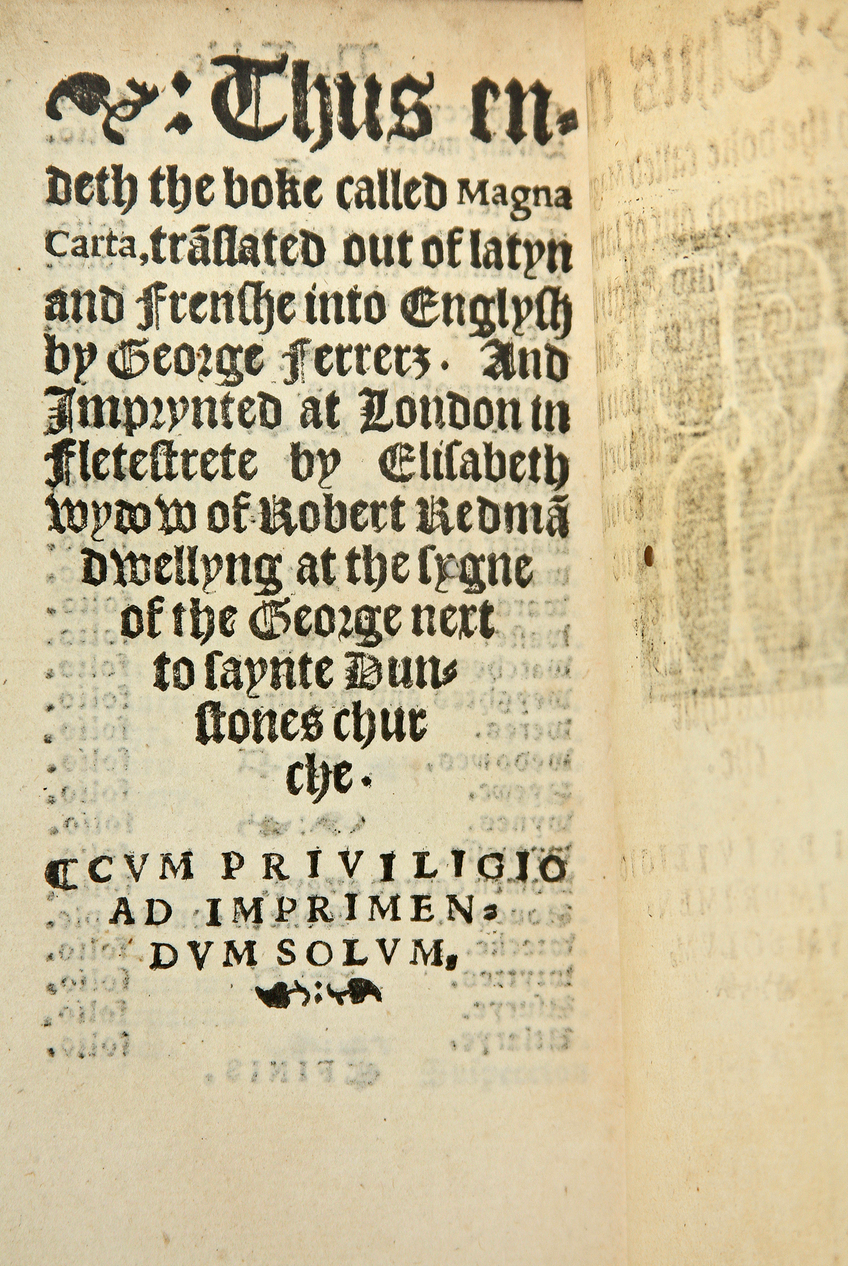
Colophon from The Great Charter, Called in Latin Magna Carta, London: Elisabeth Pickering, 1540/41

England followed the European custom of allowing widows to inherit the guild privilege and business of their late printer and publisher husbands until they remarried, and 34 widows are known to have been active as book printers and publishers in London in 1641–1660.

- Elisabeth Pickering (c. 1510–1562) was an English printer, the first woman in England to print books under her maiden name.
- Mary Clark (est. by 1650 – after 1697) was a 17th-century printer and publisher who operated on Aldersgate Street, London, from 1677 to 1696. Operating her shop on Aldersgate Street, Clark oversaw the printing and publication of over 100 imprints. The print shop was established by her husband, Andrew Clark. After his death in 1677, Clark continued to run the shop herself until 1696. At the time, in 17th-century London, it was unusual for a woman to own and operate a print shop.

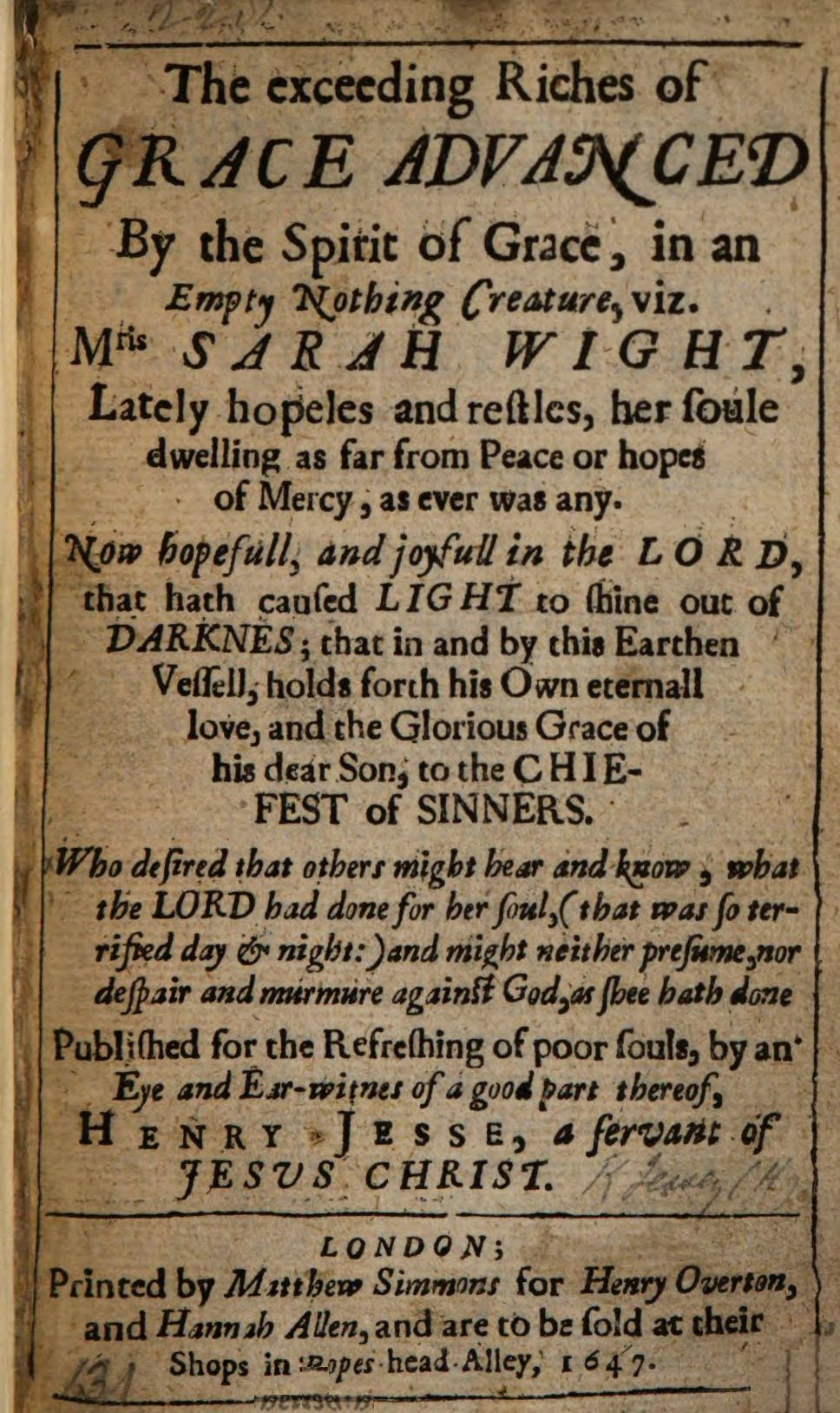
Title page of The Exceeding Riches of Grace (1647), probably the most popular book Hannah Allen sold

- Hannah Allen (est. by 1610–after 1664) (fl. 1632 – 1664), born Hannah Howse and later Hannah Chapman, was an English bookseller and printer whose trade focussed on religious treatises and colonial affairs in America. Our knowledge of Allen's activities comes mainly from documents dated between 1646 and 1651.
- Elinor James (born Banckes, 1644 – 17 July 1719) was an English printer and controversialist, who used her own printing press to address public concerns throughout her adult life. At the age of 17, she married Thomas James, a printer in London, on 27 October 1662.
- Elizabeth Mallet (est. by 1650–after 1706) was a 17th- and 18th-century English printer and bookseller. She and her husband, David Mallet, ran a printing and bookselling business in the later 17th century. After David died in 1683, she ran two presses. She published serial news publications such as The New State of Europe beginning on 20 September 1701 and sensational tracts. She produced Britain's first daily newspaper, The Daily Courant on 11 March 1702. It was a single newssheet carrying digests of foreign papers.
- Ann Lea (1661–1728) was a British lithographer, map and globe seller and publisher in London who prepared maps for several works including Christopher Saxton's The Traveller's Guide being the best map of the Kingdom of England and Principality of Wales (20 sheets) and Robert Morden's A new map of the West-Indies, or the islands of America 1702.
- Anne Dodd (c. 1685 Anne Barnes–1739) was the most famous English news seller and pamphlet shop proprietor in the 18th century. In 1708, married Nathaniel Dodd, who had purchased a stationer's license. Nathaniel and Anne set up their shop at the sign of the Peacock outside Temple Bar in late 1711, and the shop operated successfully for nearly half a century afterward.
- Sarah Baskerville (née Ruston; formerly Eaves; c. 1708 – 21 March 1788) was an English printer and businesswoman associated with the Birmingham printer, japanner and typefounder John Baskerville.
- Ann Ward (printer) (1715/16 – 10 April 1789) was a British printer and business owner in York. As a printer, Ann is best known for her role in the publication of the first edition of Laurence Sterne's The Life and Opinions of Tristram Shandy, Gentleman in 1760, the York Courant and the first guidebook and directory to the city of York in 1787. An 18th-century Short-title catalogue records almost a hundred titles printed by Ann Ward.
- Martha Gurney (1733–1816) was an English printer, bookseller, and publisher, known as an abolitionist activist. In partnership with her brother Joseph, a shorthand writer, from 1773, she produced a long series of trial books. Her business was in the Temple Bar area of London, moving later to Holborn. She also published sermons, for example, those of James Dore, her minister at Maze Pond. In the years 1788 to 1794 she was at her most active in producing pamphlets. In 1794, Gurney, along with other publishers, produced a new edition of Benjamin Franklin's Information to Those who would Remove to America (1884).
- Elizabeth Jackson (est. by 1763– after 1788) (active 1783-1788 in London) was a London print seller, significant in particular for being the publisher of nearly seventy prints by the young Thomas Rowlandson in the mid-1780s.
- Eleanor Lay (est. by 1768–after 1790) (active 1788–1790 in Brighton) was a publisher and print-seller, with a fashionable print shop on The Steine in Brighton. As well as selling prints from London publishers, she designed and published a number of prints herself, including four views of Brighton in 1788., dedicated to Mrs. Fitzherbert. The original watercolours by Lay are in the Brighton Museum. In 1789 she published two prints by the young Thomas Rowlandson. and also co-published several others by him with the London publishers Samuel William Fores and John Harris.
- Sarah Roddam (1758 – 1828) was a printer, stationer, bookseller, and circulating library proprietor in the town of North Shields, Northumberland (now Tyne & Wear.) She took over the business on the death of her husband, Cuthbert Roddam, in 1797, training her son, James, who took over the business on her death in 1828.

=== Scotland ===
- Janet Kene (active 1631-1639), widow of Edinburgh-based printer and publisher Andro Hart, continued her husband's business and became a formidable book merchant in her own right. With the aid of her sons Samuel and John, Kene printed a variety of texts including a special edition of poems presented to Charles I to commemorate his coronation visit in 1633. Janet Kene's sister, Margaret Kene, was married to the printer John Wreittoun, who had been operating a press from at least 1624.

=== Colonial America ===
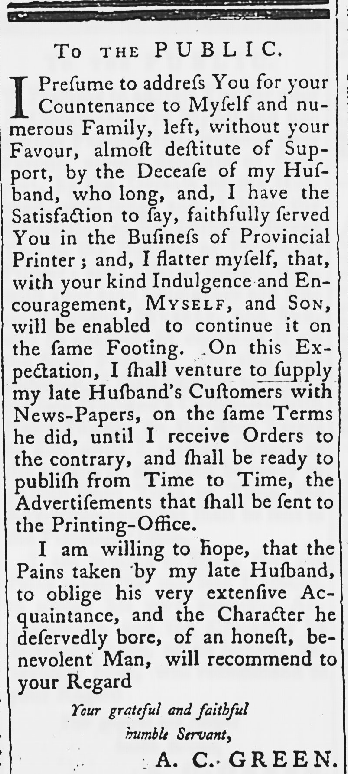
1767 Maryland Gazette announcement by Anne Catherine (A.C.) Green

There were a few women publishers in the 18th century, including the tumultuous times leading up to and through the American Revolution. Since printing was often a multi-generational family business, there were some printing families with two or more generations of women printers, which was the case with Ann Timothy and her mother-in-law, Elizabeth Timothy. Benjamin Franklin also played a role in women running printing and publishing businesses. Franklin had used his own money to set up printing operations in the colonies for six years for each business. In the meantime, if the husband, like Lewis Timothy died, Franklin negotiated the arrangements for wives to take over the contract. It was generally a financial necessity for widowed women in the printing profession to carry on the business, like Ann, Elizabeth, and Margaret Hartman Markoe Bache.

These women followed Elizabeth Glover who set up a printing press after the seaboard journey from England to the Massachusetts Bay Colony between 1638 and 1639 when it is believed that The Freeman's Oath was published in Glover's house.

There were at least six women who were the official printers for various colonial governments, as Ann Timothy did for the state of South Carolina. According to a syndicated article, "Helped the Colonial Cause": "In nearly every case they advocated the colonial cause, and their editorials did much to arouse the spirit of patriotism in the men."

- Dinah Nuthead (est. by 1662–after 1707 (fl. 1696) was a colonial printer based in the Province of Maryland. She is believed to be the first woman to be licensed as a printer in the Thirteen Colonies. Her husband, William Nuthead, established the second colonial printing business in Jamestown, Virginia, in 1682. They moved to St. Mary's City, Maryland, in 1686 and established a press that primarily printed government forms. Following her husband's death in 1695, Nuthead inherited the press and took over the business.
- Ann Smith Franklin (2 October 1696 – 16 April 1763), along with her husband James Franklin and brother-in-law Benjamin Franklin, began publishing The New-England Courant in 1721. It was the first independent newspaper published in the American colonies. She became experienced in the printing business and general business practices. The couple established the Rhode Island Gazette in 1732 where Ann was assistant printer, skilled in setting type and operating the press. James was ill for a period of time and ultimately died on 4 February 1735. Ann took over the business, using the signature "Widow Franklin". Her six-year-old son, James J., traveled with Benjamin Franklin to Philadelphia to be educated by a private tutor. She taught her daughters how to set type and assist in running the printing business, which also printed books, almanacs, and other printed works.

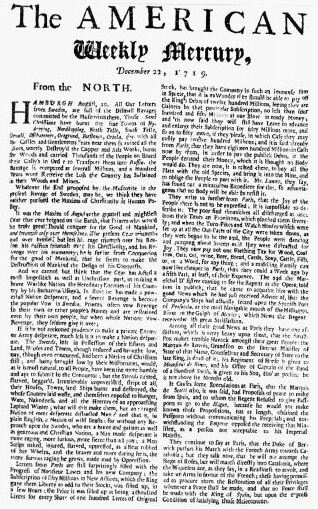
American Weekly Mercury, Cornelia Smith Bradford, 1719

- Cornelia Smith Bradford (est. by 1690s–August 1755) was a printer and newspaper editor located in Philadelphia. She is one of only eleven American women known to have supported themselves as printers before the American Revolution.
- Elizabeth Timothy (30 June 1702 – April 1757) was a prominent colonial American printer and newspaper publisher in the colony of South Carolina who worked for Benjamin Franklin. She was the first woman in America to become a newspaper publisher. Benjamin compared her to her late husband, "Her accounts were clearer, she collected on more bills, and she cut off advertisements if payments were not current."
- Anna Catharina Zenger (c. 1704–1751) was an American publisher and the first woman to publish a newspaper in America. Her husband, John Zenger printed and published New-York Weekly Journal. He was also said to have had editorial control, but the influential lawyer James Alexander was responsible for the paper's tone and content. In 1734, John Zenger was arrested for seditious libel. and, spent more than eight months imprisoned. During this time Anna Catharina took over his publishing duties and may have received guidance during her regular visits to her husband in prison. On John's release in 1735, he resumed control of the paper and printing business. Eleven years later, after her husband's death, Anna Catharina once again took responsibility for running both operations. She continued to publish the paper weekly, including a modest section of advertisements, along with other publications, including an annual almanac, and the printing shop also sold books and stationery.
- Anne Catherine Green (c.1720 – 23 March 1775) was a printer and publisher in Maryland. Green published the Maryland Gazette and fulfilled contracts for the Maryland legislature during the period when her husband was ill and after his death in 1767. The family was left debt-ridden, and she needed to coordinate her printing and family activities for her six children, so she moved the printing business into her rented home. Green was able to keep on schedule for major jobs, like the printing of Acts and Votes and Proceedings for the Maryland legislature. She negotiated the same payment as would have been received by her husband. She got the family out of debt and purchased their home and printing business in three years.
- Ann Timothy (c. 1727 – 11 September 1792) published the South Carolina Gazette, working alongside her husband until his death in 1782, and she published the newspaper by herself. She became the official printer for the state of South Carolina.
- Mary Katharine Goddard (16 June 1738 – 12 August 1816) was an early American publisher and the postmaster of the Baltimore Post Office from 1775 to 1789. She was the second printer to print the Declaration of Independence. Her copy, the Goddard Broadside, was commissioned by Congress in 1777 and was the first to include the names of the signatories.

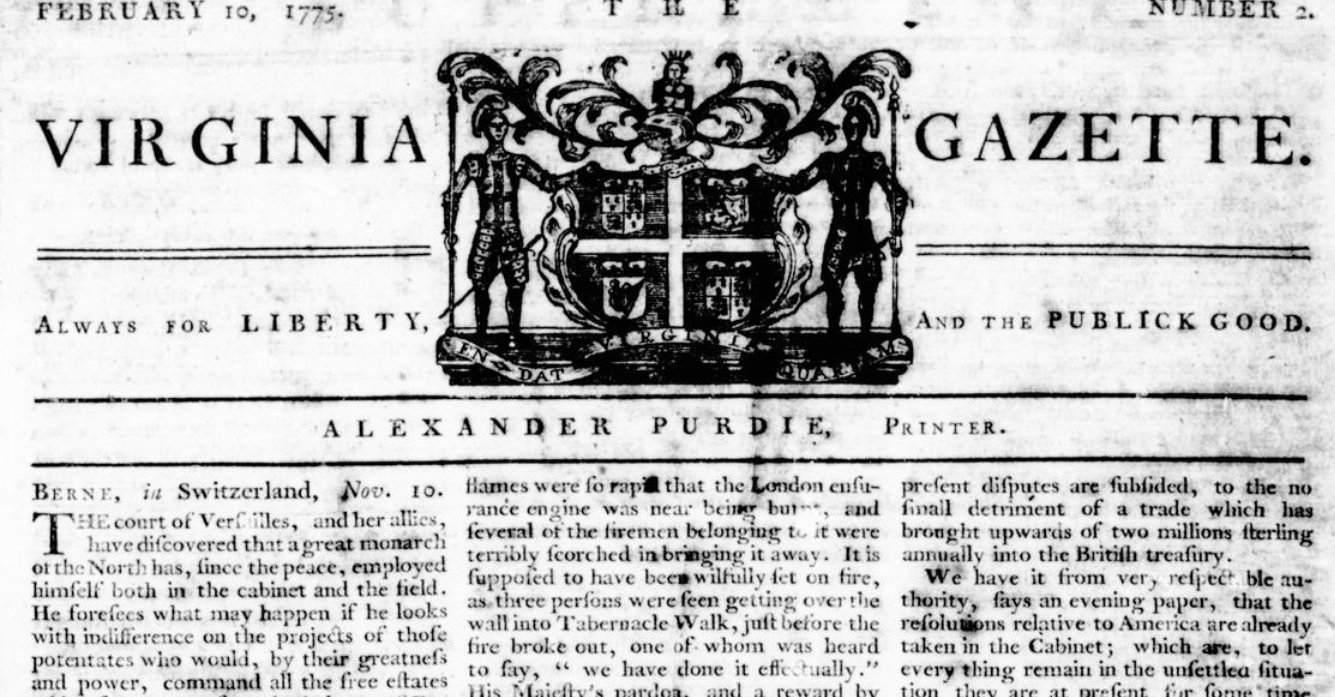
The Virginia Gazette, Clementina Rind, 10 February 1775

- Clementina Rind (c. 1740 – September 25, 1774) was a Colonial American woman who is known as being the first female newspaper printer and publisher in Virginia. Living and working in Williamsburg, Virginia, she took over the printing press after her husband's death in 1773. Clementina continued to print The Virginia Gazette and also published Thomas Jefferson's tract A Summary View of the Rights of British America.

== Ireland ==
- Mary Crooke (est. by 1637–after 23 June 1685) (fl. 1657–1692) was an Irish printer and bookseller. She married the king's printer in Ireland, John Crooke. After his death in 1669 Crooke's brother, this meant that Crooke became the king's printer and held a monopoly on the printing, binding, and selling of books in Ireland. This made her one of the earliest recorded women printers in Ireland, along with Jane Jones in the 1740s.

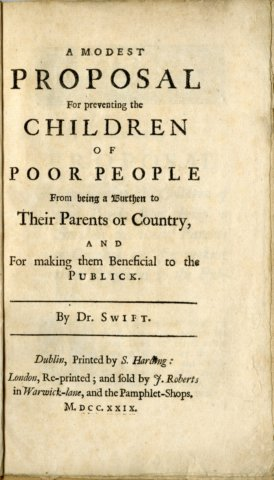
A Modest Proposal 1729 Cover, London imprint by Sarah Harding

- Sarah Hyde (est. by 1694–1750) was an Irish printer and bookseller. Born Sarah Ray, she was the only daughter of Dublin booksellers and printers Joseph and Elizabeth Ray. She married printer and bookseller, John Hyde, on 18 June 1714. Following her husband's death in November 1728, Hyde took over their business on Dame Street in Dublin. In the 1730s and 1740s she was involved in collaborative ventures with other printers. Along with having more stable relationships with one or two other printers, this sort of ad hoc publishing relationship with individual printers was very common in the book trade in Dublin at that time.
- Sarah Harding (est. by 1701–after 1729) (fl. 1721–1729) was an Irish printer and publisher who suffered "inopportune imprisonments" for some of her publications. She is known for publishing Jonathan Swift's controversial A Modest Proposal in 1729 (a sharp satire that compared English treatment of the Irish to cannibalism). Sarah Harding was the wife and business partner of printer John Harding on the Blind Quay, Dublin. Her mother was a well-known Dublin printer, Elizabeth Sadlier. Following her husband's imprisonment for publishing an unauthorised version of the lord lieutenant's speech on the opening of the parliamentary session, Harding took over the printing business. Her first publication was a pamphlet, The present miserable state of Ireland (1721), that is occasionally attributed to Jonathan Swift.

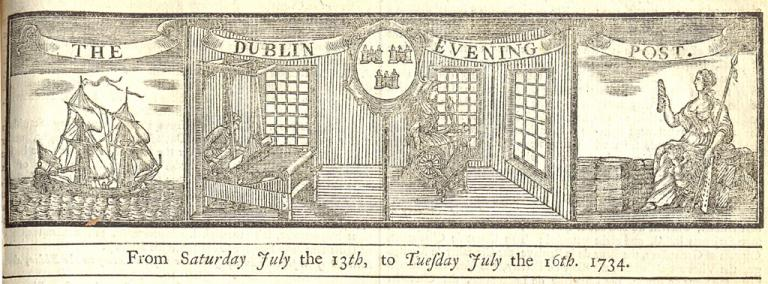
Masthead for the Dublin Evening Post in 1734

- Alice Reilly (1702/3 – 1778) was an Irish printer and publisher who took over her husband's business after his death in 1741. She was a dues-paying, but not full, member of the Guild of St Luke the Evangelist, due to her gender. She ran a successful business and in 1776 she had six apprentices and seven journeymen. She co-published The Oracle, formerly the Dublin News-Letter, with Edward Exshaw from 1741 to 1744. With Exshaw, Reilly was appointed by the Dublin Society as an official printer on 24 March 1743. She also published a range of books, produced for Exshaw and others, as well as book catalogues in 1775 and 1760.
- Jane Jones (est. by 1704–1739) was an Irish printer, bookseller, and newspaper proprietor. Jones took over publishing the Dublin Evening Post and book printing business in 1736.
- Elizabeth Pue (est. by 1704–after 1726) was an Irish newspaper publisher, bookseller, and proprietor of Dick's Coffee House.
- Anne Esdall (c. 1718 – c. 1795) was an Irish printer, publisher, and bookseller. She married the printer, publisher, and bookseller, James Esdall on 31 August 1745. In her husband's absences due to legal issues regarding the content of his newspapers The Censor, or Citizen's Journal and The Censor Extraordinary, Esdall ran his printing shop from Copper-Alley on Cork Hill, Dublin.
- Sarah Cotter (est. by 1731–after 1792) (fl. 1751–1792) was an Irish printer and bookseller who took over the business of Joseph Cotter, a bookseller in Dublin, after he died around 1751. Cotter is one of the few women to be admitted into the guild of St Luke the Evangelist as a quarter-brother in 1756, which was usually denied to women as they were not permitted full freedom. She paid quarterage to the guild until 1770.
- Elizabeth Watts (est. by 1740–1794) was an Irish printer, stationer, and "bookseller to the courts of law" who took over her husband's business after his death in 1762. She married for a second time to the curate of St Werburgh's, Dublin, and bookseller, the Reverend Stewart Lynch. Known from then on as Mrs. Lynch, she continued to operate her bookselling and lending business from 6 Skinner Row. She sold books regarding legal matters, was a printer with Daniel Graisberry, and sold imported stationery from the Netherlands and France.
- Sarah Pue (est. by 1741–1777?) was an Irish printer, publisher, patent medicine seller, and proprietor of Dick's Coffee House. Her husband, James Pue, was the successor of his uncle Richard Pue, taking over the Pue businesses of printing, publishing and owning Dick's Coffee House in 1758. After James' death in December 1762, Pue took over running the businesses.
- Catherine Finn (c. 1749 – 1832) was an Irish printer and owner of Finn's Leinster Journal. After her husband's death on 5 April 1777, Finn continued to print and publish the Journal. She ran the printing business, while raising seven children, until 1805. She sold advertisement space, organised editorial content, and oversaw the printing and the distribution.

== Italy ==
- Estellina Conat (fl. 1474–1477) was an Italian-Jewish printer in Mantova. She was the first woman active as a printer.
- Bat Sheba of Verona (fl. 1594), was a Jewish-Italian printer, active in Verona.
- Salomè Antonazzoni, also known as Valeria Austori, (fl. 1619 – fl. 1642) was an Italian stage actress. She was a leading lady and toured with the theatre company i Confidenti of Flaminio Scala and was under the patronage of Giovanni de' Medici. She later was active in the company of her husband, actor Giovan Geronimo Favella, in Naples. When she was widowed in 1642, she took over the printing press of her late spouse and developed his pamphlets into a paper.
- Girolama Cartolari (circa 1500-1559) was an Italian printer from Perugia, active in Rome in the years 1543-1559. She was the wife of printer Baldassarre Cartolari and ran the printing shop in Rome after his death.

== Netherlands ==
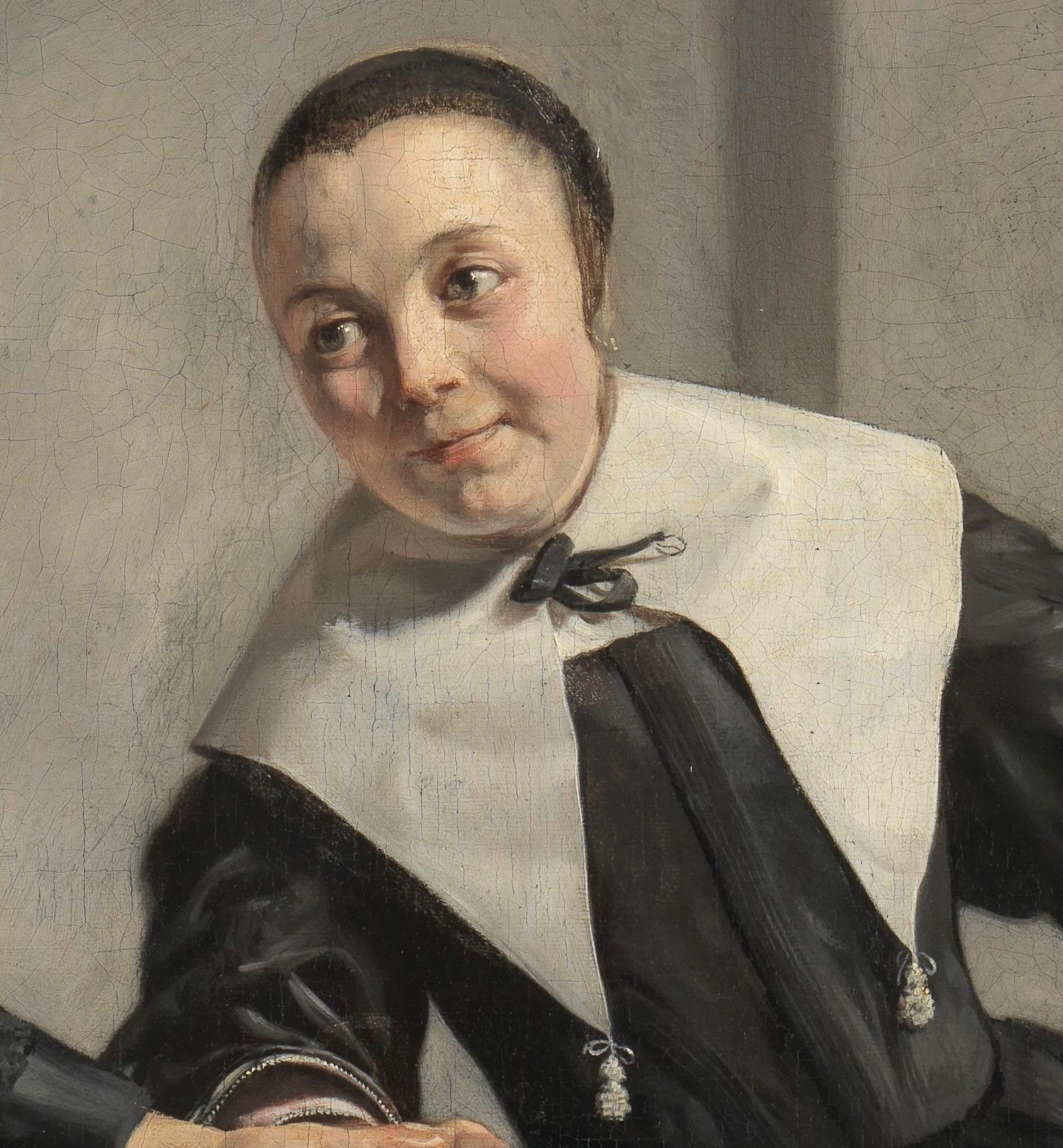
Portrait of Margaretha van Bancken

- Machteld van Wouw (1580–1662) was a Dutch printer and publisher. She was the official government publisher in 1622-1662.
- Margaretha van Bancken (1628–1694) was a Dutch publisher from Haarlem. With her husband, Abraham Casteleyn, the printer for the city, they ran a printing business and the newspaper called Opregte Haarlemsche Courant.
- Anna van Westerstee Beek (25 November 1657–after October 1717) of The Hague, was a Dutch publisher of maps. Most of the maps, created for military purposes, recorded ground troop and naval moments. The War of the Spanish Succession began in 1701 and the majority of the maps she sold were of key moments, providing news of events in real-time. After her husband, publisher and art dealer Barent Beek, deserted her and their children, she ran the family business. Since at least 1697 she often used her maiden name "Van Westerstee" again. Thirty maps produced by Beek are part of the Geography and Map Division's collection at the U.S. Library of Congress.
- Catharina Buijs (1714–1781) was a Dutch printer. Widowed after Johannes II van Keulen in 1755, she managed his printing business, as well as his office as the official cartography printer of the Dutch East India Company in Amsterdam, which she managed until her death.
- Sara Johanna de Beer (1749/1750–after 1811) was a printer and editor of a number of newspapers and magazines in Paramaribo in the Dutch colony of Surinam. She was married in 1773, and they had six children. In 1774, the couple started De Weeklyksche Woensdaagsche Surinaamse Courant, the first and only newspaper of the colony until 1785. When her husband died in 1781, she continued the business and used her name on the newspapers. During the 1780s the business got into financial problems, and de Beer had to sell off some slaves "who could read and write." De Beer published at least six newspapers, but often received warnings from the government, and at least one publication ban.
- Catharina Egges (1750–1824) was a Dutch publisher. Between 1781 and 1824, she managed the publishing company Algemeene bibliotheek.

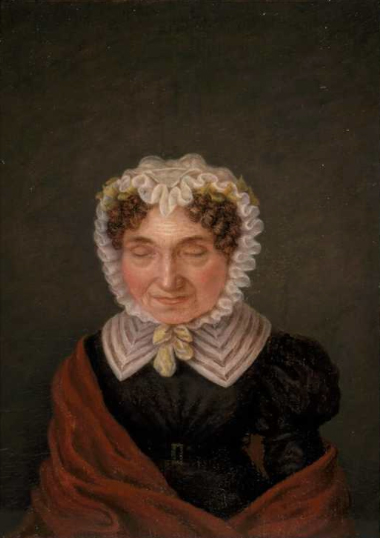
Portrait of Petronella Moens (1820/1824) by Margaretha Cornelia Boellaard

- Petronella Moens (16 November 1762 – 4 January 1843) was a blind Dutch writer, editor, and feminist. She managed a paper in 1788–1797, in which she addressed political issues such as slavery and women suffrage. Despite her disability, she wrote dozens of poems and books, such as Songbook for the Churches and its 432 songs. In 1785, she received a gold medal from the Amsteldamsch Dicht- en Letterlievend Genootschap for her poem De waare christian and would by the end of her life possess ten such awards.

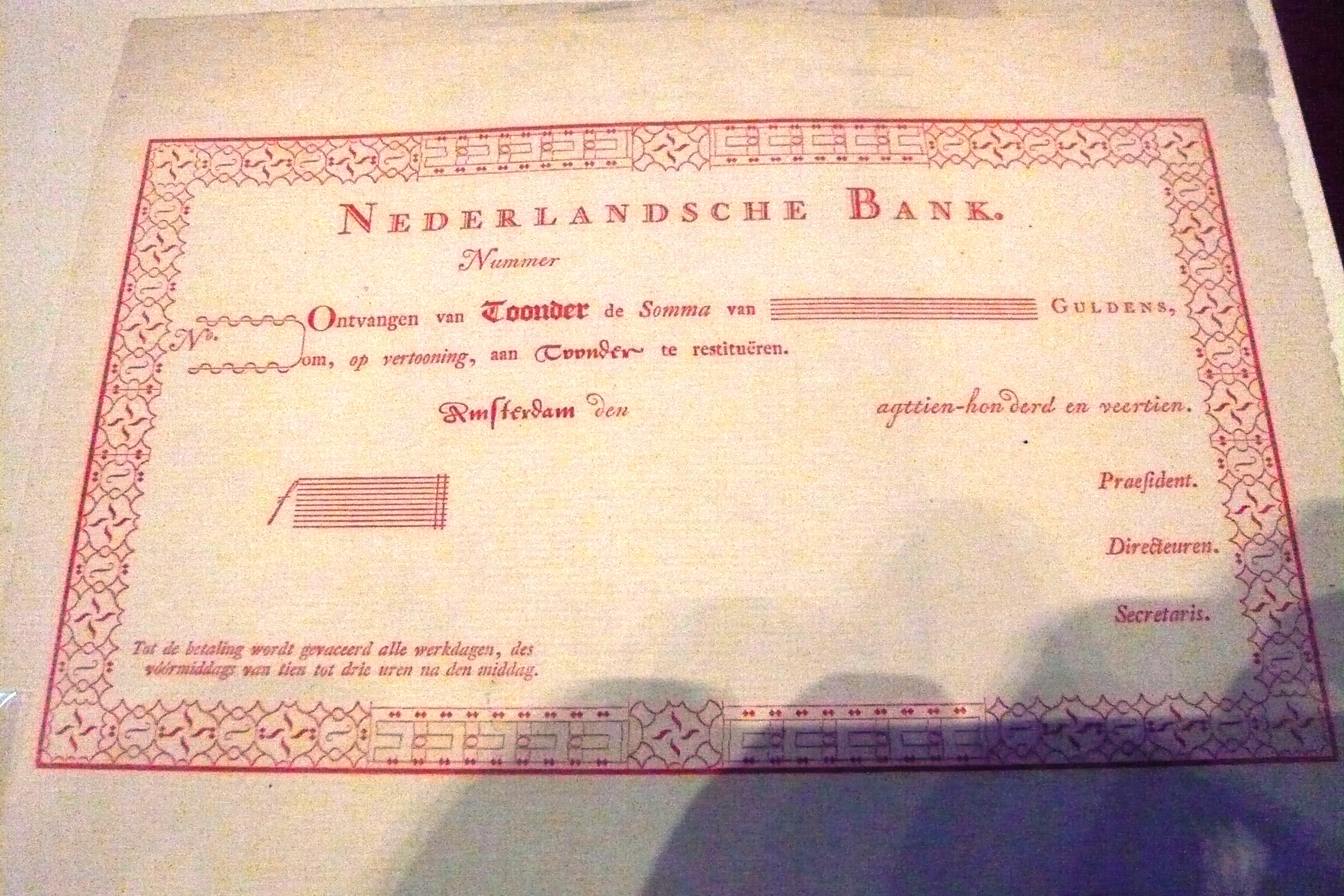
The first Dutch banknote called Roodborstje, featuring the decorative edges with the "Pearl music" font

- Johanna Elisabeth Swaving (17 December 1754 – 26 June 1826), was a Dutch businesswoman and publisher of the Oprechte Haerlemsche Courant. She married Johannes Enschedé Jr., partner of the publishing and typesetting company Joh. Enschedé. After her husband's death in 1799 she continued his business, including the local newspaper. In her role as leader of Joh. Enschedé, she discovered new ways to publicize the company's distinctive talents as font owners by using the Enschedé fonts in advertisements in her newspaper. One of her programmes for her local theatre group used a decorative edging that became the model for the Netherlands' first banknote, which was printed by Enschedé in 1814.

== Norway ==
- Birgithe Kühle (1762–1832), was a Norwegian (originally Danish) journalist and managing editor who has been referred to as the first female journalist in Norway. She published the paper Provincial-Lecture in Bergen from 1794 to 1795. The paper mainly consisted of translated popular science, novels, and articles from English, French and German magazines.

== Ottoman Empire ==
- Doña Reyna Mendes (c. 1539–1599) was an Ottoman Jewish printer. After the death of her spouse in 1579, she established her own printing business, one in Belvedere, near Constantinople, and another press in the Constantinople suburb of Kuru Cesme. She published at least fifteen books, including a tractate of the Talmud as well as several prayer books. She was the first Jewish woman to have established her own press rather than inheriting it, and the first woman printer and publisher in the Ottoman Empire.

== Poland ==
- Helena Ungler or Unglerowa (est. by 1500 – died 1551), was a Polish printer. Her husband, Florian Ungler, owned and managed a book printing business in Kraków. After his death in 1536, she took over the ownership and management of the printing shop until her own death.
- Judith Rosanes (died 1805), was a Jewish-Polish printer. She was active as a printer with her spouse David Mann of Zolkiev, and after his death established her printing business in Lviv in 1782. She was the first Jewish woman to print Hebrew books on a commercial basis over an extended period, and printed at least fifty books until her death. After her death, her printing press was managed by her daughter-in-law Chave Grossman (in 1827–1849) and granddaughter Feige (in 1849–1857).

== Spain ==
- Juana Millán (d. after 1550) was a Spanish book printer.
- Jerònima Galés (d. 1587) was a Spanish printer. She was the owner and manager of a major printing business in Valencia in 1556–1559 and in 1580–1587, during her two widowhoods.
- María Ramírez (fl. 1632) was a Spanish printer. She was the owner and manager of a major printing business in Alcala in 1587–1632.
- Isabel Ana Sebastiá (d. 1666) was a Spanish printer. She was the owner and manager of a major printing business in Valencia in 1647–1650 and in 1655–1666, during her two widowhoods.
- María de Quiñones (est. by 1582–d. 1669) was a Spanish book printer. She married the printer Juan de la Cuesta in 1602, who left for India five years after their marriage. She managed the business between 1607 and 1666. Her company was one of the most successful in Spain and responsible for the publication of a large number of the literature of the Spanish Golden Age.
- María Fernández (1610–1671) was a Spanish printer. She was the owner and manager of a printing business in Alcalá de Henares in 1643–1671.
- Isabel Jolís Oliver (1682–1770) was a Catalan printer and engraver who took over her family's business after the death of her brother at the age of 77. She used the imprint "Hereus de Joan Jolís" (Heirs of Joan Jolís). The company had three printing presses. She printed the second edition of the Miguel de Cervantes novel Don Quijote, in 1762, and printed for the seminary and the Episcopal Palace of Barcelona.
- Francisca de Aculodi (fl. 1689) was a 17th- and 18th-century Spanish editor and journalist. When her spouse died in 1678, she inherited his printing privilege and title of "Impresora de la Muy Noble y Muy Leal Provincia de Guipúzcoa". She founded and published the San Sebastián newspaper Noticias Principales y Verdaderas beginning in 1683.
- Beatriz Cienfuegos (1701–1786) was a Spanish editor and journalist. She was the founder and publisher of the La Pensadora Gaditana (1763), the first paper edited by a woman in Spain, and has been referred to as the first Spanish journalist.
- Juana María Romeo y Leoz (d. 1732) was a Spanish printer. She was the owner and manager a printing business in Pamplona as a widow in 1716–1719.
- María Candelaria Rivera Calderón y Benavides (d. 1754) was a Spanish printer. She was the owner and manager of a printing business in Mexico City in Spanish Mexico as a widow in 1714–1732.
- Josefa Burguete (d. 1787) was a Spanish printer. She was the owner and manager of a printing business in Pamplona as a widow in 1775–1787.

== Sweden ==
During the Middle Ages, nuns of the Vadstena Abbey managed a printing press and published works, but the first woman to be professionally active as a printer and publisher was not to appear until circa 1500. Since the widow of a male printer and publisher normally took over the business of her late spouse, women became fairly common in these professions in relation to the number of males, particularly in the 18th century, which was an era during which the Swedish press expanded rapidly, and 45 widow printers and publishers are known between 1496 and 1799; however, the majority of them only managed the business a few years before they remarried, and only a few truly left a mark in the profession.

- Anna Fabri (fl. 1496) was a Swedish publisher and printer. She was the first female book printer in Sweden. She married printer Johann Fabri and took over his business as a widow in 1496. Among her works, Brevianse Strengenense, Breviens Upsalea and some magistri impressorie artis are known.
- Maria Wankijf (fl. 1705) was a Swedish printer and publisher.
- Catharina Höök (died 1727), widowed after the Royal Book Printer Henrik Keyser the Younger in 1699, she took over the office and business of Royal Book Printer after her late spouse; her most known work was the printing of the Bible of king Charles XII of Sweden, an order given to her spouse in 1697 and finished by her.
- Margareta Momma (1702–1772) was a Swedish publisher, chief editor and journalist. She was the chief editor and publisher of the political essay Samtal emellan Argi Skugga och en obekant Fruentimbers Skugga (1738–1739) as well as the chief editor and publisher of the Stockholm Gazette (1742–1752).
- Brita Laurelia (1712–1784) was a Swedish publicist, book printer, poet, and publisher. She was the owner and director of the Kungliga Amiralitetsboktryckeriet ('Royal Admiralty Printing Press') in Karlskrona and the publisher of the newspaper Carlskrona Weckoblad ('Karlskrona Weekly') in 1754–1758 och 1766–1769, during her two widowhoods.
- Catharina Ahlgren (1734 – c. 1800) was a Swedish proto feminist poet and publisher, and one of the first identifiable female journalists in Sweden. She was the publisher and chief editor of a number of women's periodicals in Stockholm and Finland between 1772 and 1783, and the publisher of the first periodical (as well as the first one by a woman) in Finland Om konsten att rätt behaga (1782).
- Anna Hammar-Rosén, née Hammar (1735–1805), was a Swedish newspaper editor. She was the director, chief editor, and publisher of the popular newspaper Hwad Nytt?? Hwad Nytt?? in Gothenburg between 1773 and 1795.
- Elsa Fougt (15 or 25 December 1744 – 19 June 1826) was a Swedish printer and newspaper editor. She managed the Royal Printery between 1772 and 1811 (first as a coworker with her spouse, from 1782 alone as director), and was responsible for the country's official print. She was also the publisher and chief editor of the newspaper Stockholms Weckoblad ('Stockholm Weekly') in 1774–1779. She was an important figure in the literary market in Sweden.
- Maria Christina Vinqvist (d. 1821), was a Swedish printer and publisher. She was the owner and director of the Kungliga Amiralitetsboktryckeriet ('Royal Admiralty Printing Press') in Karlskrona and the publisher of the newspaper Carlskrona Weckoblad ('Karlskrona Weekly') in 1785–1790 and in 1818–1821, during her two widowhoods.

== Switzerland ==
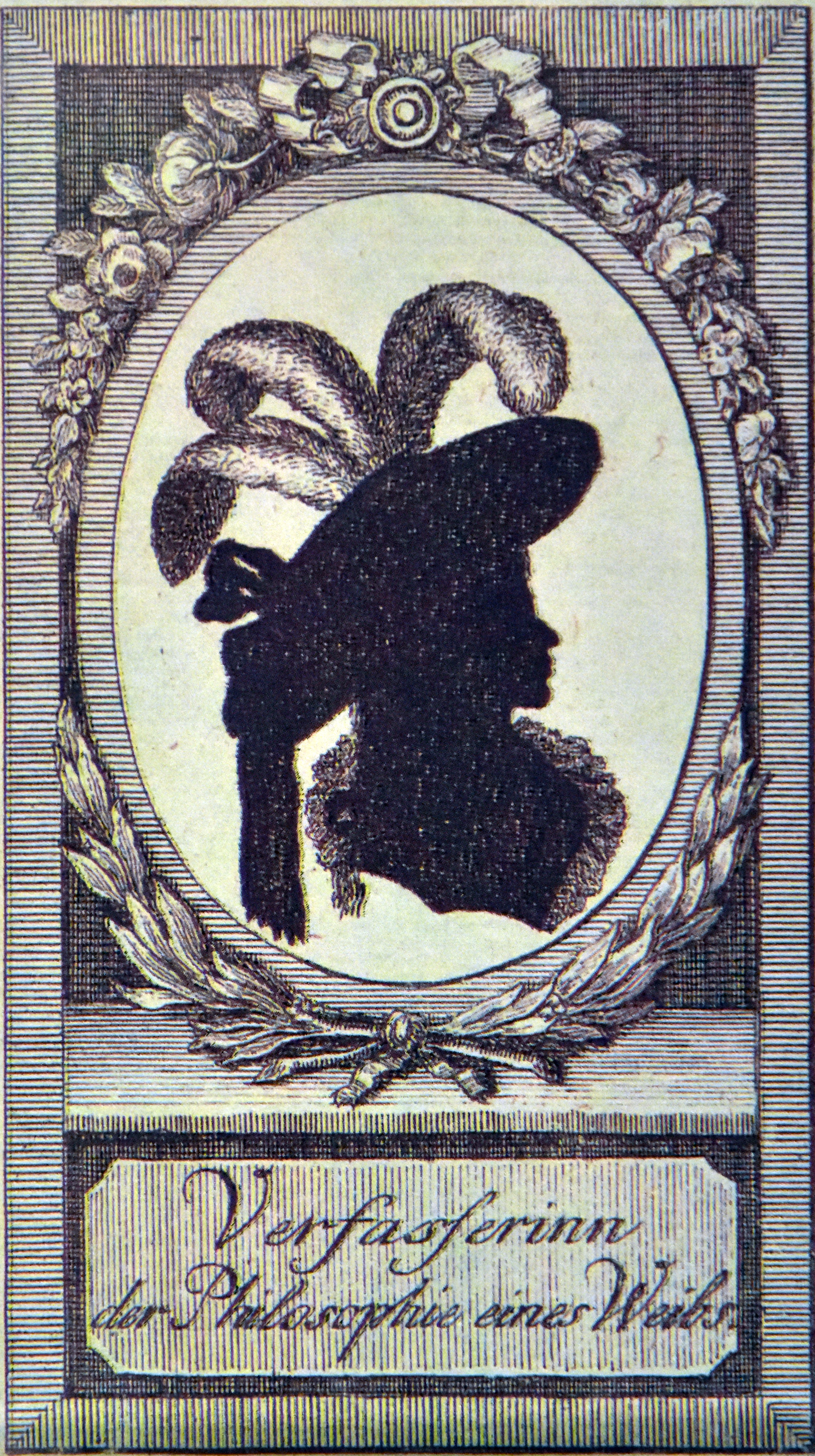
Paper cutting by an unknown artist, the only known portrait of Marianne Ehrmann

- Michelle Nicod (1519 – 3 January 1618) was a book printer and publisher, active in Geneva from 1585 to 1618.
- Marianne Ehrmann (25 November 1755 – 14 August 1795)) was a woman journalist and publicist. Beginning in 1787, she wrote for the Frauen-Zeitung newspaper which was published by her husband, and composed the epistolary novel "Amalie and Minna". She also worked on the weekly Der Beobachter, published by her husband since August 1788. From 1790 to 1792 she issued a ground-breaking monthly magazine for women, Amaliens Erholungsstunden (literally: Amalie's holiday hours).

== United States ==
Women active in the United States (after 1776).

- Margaret Hartman Markoe Bache (7 November 1770 – 28 May 1836) was a printer and newspaper publisher for the Philadelphia Aurora, working first with her first husband Benjamin Franklin Bache. She and her second husband William Duane ran the Aurora.

== See also ==
- Women printers
- List of women music publishers before 1900
