= Von Stahel und Eysen =

First printed book on metallurgy, published in 1532

Von Stahel und Eysen (English: On Steel and Iron) is the first known printed book on metallurgy, published in 1532 by several publishers: Kunegunde Hergot in Nuremberg, Melchior Sachs in Erfurt, and Peter Jordan in Mainz. It has been suggested that Hergot was probably the first to publish the text, as the material seems to come from Nuremberg: its material on tempering and quenching is similar to the short treatise on hardening iron beginning 'Von dem herten. Nu spricht meister Alkaym' in the late fourteenth- or early fifteenth-century Nuremberg manuscript Nürnberger Handschrift GNM 3227a.

About half the text is on how to harden iron and steel through tempering and quenching, mentioning water, but also a range of recipes of varying degrees of elaborateness. The recipe 'take clarified honey, fresh urine of a he-goat, alum, borax, olive oil, and salt; mix everything well together and quench therein' might, through the urea content of the urine (H_{2}NCONH_{2}), have helped to produce nitrated, 'case-hardened' iron. Less likely to have been efficacious is: 'take varnish, dragon's blood, horn scrapings, half as much salt, juice made from earthworms, radish juice, tallow, and vervain and quench therein. It is also very advantageous in hardening if a piece that is to be hardened is first thoroughly cleaned and well polished'.

A modern commentator on some of the more outlandish techniques in the book noted: "There isn't really much to say...except that perhaps it was meant to trip up rivals. However, this may not be the case because similar instructions were circulated in 1708 in Nuremberg."

The text also includes techniques for colouring, soldering, and etching. Etching was quite a new technology at the time, and Von Stahel und Eysen provides the first attested recipes.

== Translations ==
- Williams, H. (trans.), 'A sixteenth-century German treatise: Von Stahel und Eysen. 1532', Technical studies in the field of the fine arts, 4.2 (October, 1935), 63-92.
- Smith, Cyril Stanley (ed.), Sources for the History of the Science of Steel, 1532-1786, Society for the History of Technology, 4 (Cambridge, Mass.: Society for the History of Technology, 1968), pp. 7–19.
