= Elizabeth Watts (printer) =

Irish printer

- Died: 1794
- Known for: Bookselling
- Spouse(s): Richard Watts (17??-1762; his death); Rev Stewart Lynch (1768-1788; his death)
- Children: 5

Elizabeth Watts Lynch (died 1794), known as Mrs Lynch, was an Irish printer, stationer, and "bookseller to the courts of law".

== Biography ==
The early life of Elizabeth Watts is unknown, the first record of her is when she succeeded her first husband, Richard Watts, as printer and bookseller, after his death in November 1762. The couple had four sons and a daughter. On 14 February 1768 she married the curate of St Werburgh's, Dublin and bookseller, the Reverend Stewart Lynch (died June 1788).

Operating under the name Mrs Lynch, she continued to operate her bookselling and lending business from 6 Skinner Row. From 1762, she held sole rights to run a bookstall in the hall of the Four Courts. She focused on selling books regarding legal matters, including an edition of Blackstone's Law Tracts (1767), after which she sold a range of Irish and English legal texts, and after 1778 she printed in partnership with Daniel Graisberry. She sold imported stationery from the Netherlands and France, which led to her signing a memorial in November 1773 objecting to additional duties on foreign paper at the Irish house of commons.

Mrs Lynch died in January 1794, with her son Henry Watts continuing her business until his death in September 1794. Another of her sons, John Watts, entered Trinity College Dublin and graduated with a BA in 1790.

== See also ==
- List of women printers and publishers before 1800
