= Elizabeth Pickering =

Elizabeth Pickering may refer to:

- Elizabeth Creed née Pickering (1642–1728), daughter of Sir Gilbert Pickering
- Elisabeth Pickering (c.1510–1562), English printer
