= Höök (surname) =

Höök is a Swedish surname. Notable people with the surname include:

- Catharina Höök (died 1727), Swedish book printer
- Kristina Höök (born 1964), Swedish computer scientist
- Lars-Olof Höök (born 1945), Swedish long jumper
- Malla Höök (1811–1882), Swedish actress and courtesan
