= Alice Abbot =

Alice Abbott may refer to:

- Alice Balch Abbot, American writer
- Alice Reilly, née Abbot, Irish painter
