= Maria Wankijf =

Maria Wankijf née Matras (d. after 1705) was a Swedish printer and publisher . She managed the printing shop N. Wankijfs Enka ('Wankijf Widow'), Salig Wankijfs Enkas ('Departed Wankijf Widow') or Kongl Wankijfska Tryckeriet ('Royal Wankijf Print') between 1689 and 1705. She also printed the newspaper Ordinarie Stockholmiske Posttijdender ('General Stockholm Postal News') from 1690 to 1695.

Maria Wankijf was the daughter of the teacher Daniel Matras from France. She married first to the Royal Swedish Printer Georg Hantsch (1623–1668), and in 1669 to the employee and successor of her spouse, the royal printer Nils Wankijf (d. 1689).

Upon the death of her second spouse, she inherited his printing privilege and took over the business herself. It appears that she did not merely print the Ordinarie Stockholmiske Posttijdender but also published it, which made her the likely first female publisher in Sweden.

== See also ==
- List of women printers and publishers before 1800
