= Hannah Allen (bookseller) =

English printer

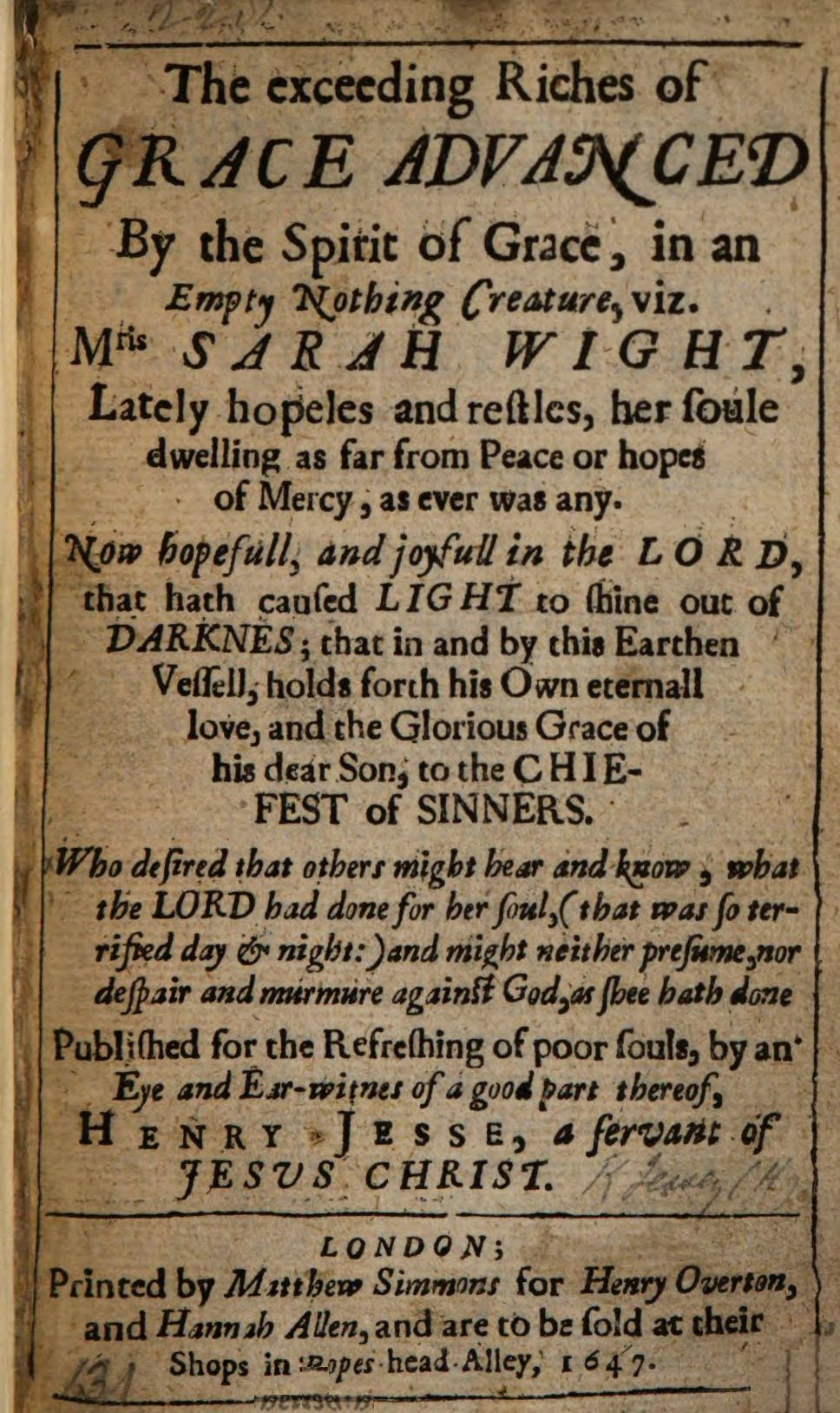
Title page of The Exceeding Riches of Grace (1647), probably the most popular book Allen sold.

Hannah Allen (fl. 1632 – 1664), born Hannah Howse and later Hannah Chapman, was an English bookseller and printer whose trade focussed on religious treatises and colonial affairs in America. Our knowledge of Allen's activities comes mainly from documents dated between 1646 and 1651.

Hannah married Benjamin Allen on 2 April 1632. He died in 1646, and Hannah took over Benjamin's bookselling business after his death; she would later marry her apprentice Livewell Chapman. In total, there are 54 literary works bearing Hannah's imprint, but Bell estimates that the true number of her publications was somewhat higher.

Bross describes Allen as a "radical sectarian"; Bell notes that the works on her booklist also tended towards millenarianism and the views of the Fifth Monarchists. She sold a number of works by religious writers, including editions of the works of Thomas Brightman, Menasseh ben Israel, and several works by Henry Jessey.

In 1647, Allen published a book by Jessey titled The Exceeding Riches of Grace Advanced by the Spirit of Grace, in an Empty Nothing Creature, Viz. Mris [sic] Sarah Wight, which became a bestseller at the time. Exceeding Riches concerned the prophetic vision of Sarah Wight, reported to have undergone such powerful religious experiences that she became paralysed. In the text, Allen is credited as a witness of Wight in her ecstatic state.

Her trade also included works on the American colonies, including several treatises on the law of Massachusetts and Connecticut.

== See also ==
- List of women printers and publishers before 1800

== Sources ==
- Bell, Maureen (1989). "Hannah Allen and the Development of a Puritan Publishing Business, 1646–51". Publishing History. 26: 5–66. ISSN 0309-2445. ProQuest 1297999183.
- Bell, Maureen (3 January 2008). "Allen [née Howse; other married name Chapman], Hannah". Oxford Dictionary of National Biography (online ed.). Oxford University Press. doi:10.1093/ref:odnb/57039. (Subscription, Wikipedia Library access or UK public library membership required.)
- Bross, Kristina (24 August 2017). Future History: Global Fantasies in Seventeenth-Century American and British Writings. Oxford University Press. doi:10.1093/oso/9780190665135.001.0001. ISBN 978-0-19-066513-5.
