= Elinor James =

English writer (1644–1719)

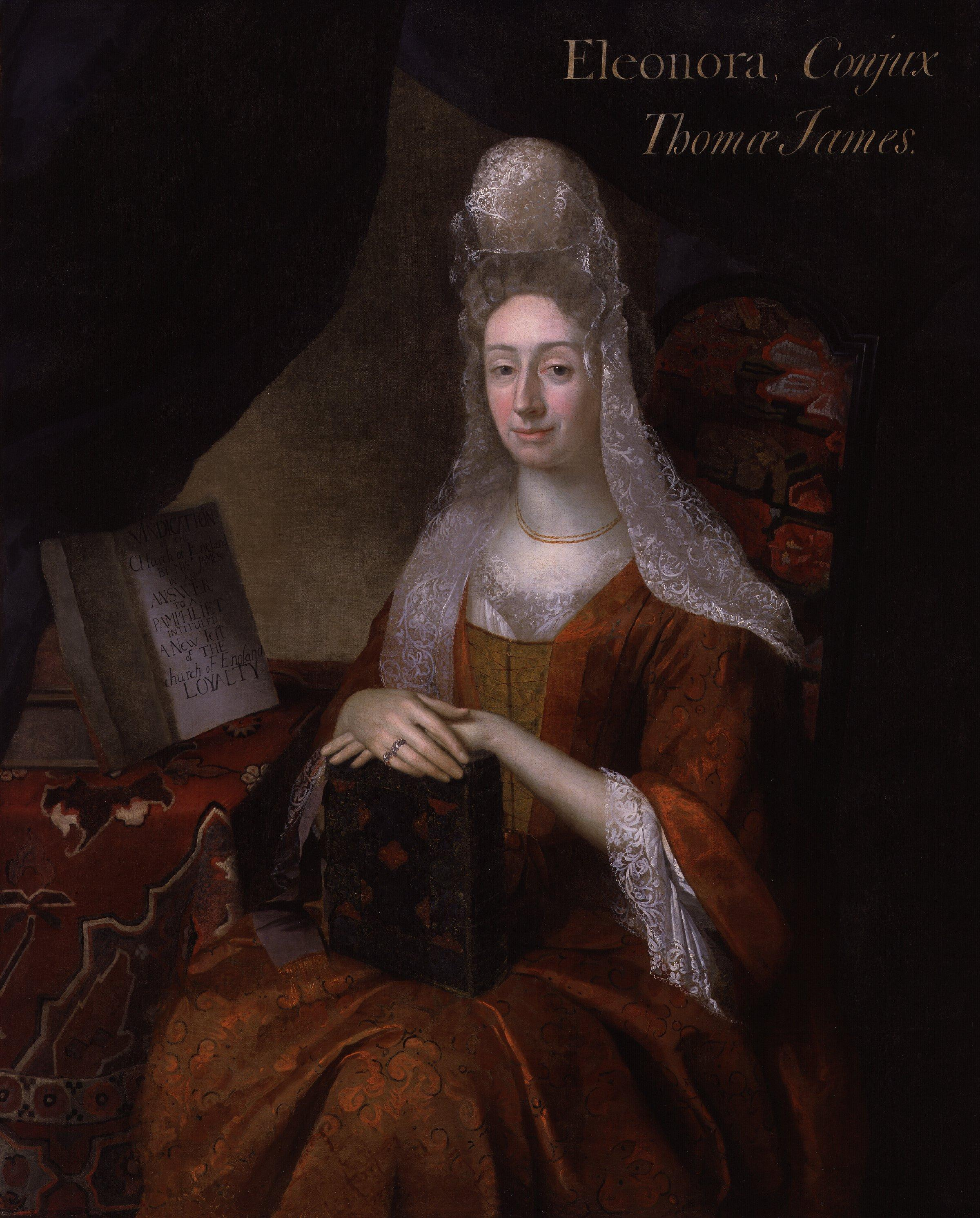
- Born: Elinor Banckes; 1644
- Died: 17 July 1719 (aged 74-75)
- Spouse: Thomas James (m.1662)
- Children: 4

Elinor James (born Banckes, 1644 – 17 July 1719) was an English printer and controversialist, who used her own printing press to address public concerns throughout her adult life. At the age of 17, she married Thomas James, a printer in London, on 27 October 1662. They had four children, two of whom survived to adulthood.

== Broadsheets ==
From the time her husband became a master printer until her death, she wrote, printed and distributed over 90 broadsheets and pamphlets under her own name, prominently displayed. Almost all were given titles that included her name, such as Mrs. James's Advice, and she produced at least one a year for 35 years.

Most of these broadsides took the form of petitions to various rulers and governmental bodies: kings, the Lords and Commons, lord mayors of London, the City of London's board of aldermen and the clergy of the time. She was vociferous about the Exclusion Crisis and the Glorious Revolution and also strongly anti-Puritan. Some of her broadsides petitioned on issues of the printing trade, such as government control of printing and taxation on paper. One entitled "On Behalf of the Printers" argued against lifting legal restrictions that had been to the advantage of existing printers, saying that to open up the trade would bring increased unemployment and economic ruin to it.

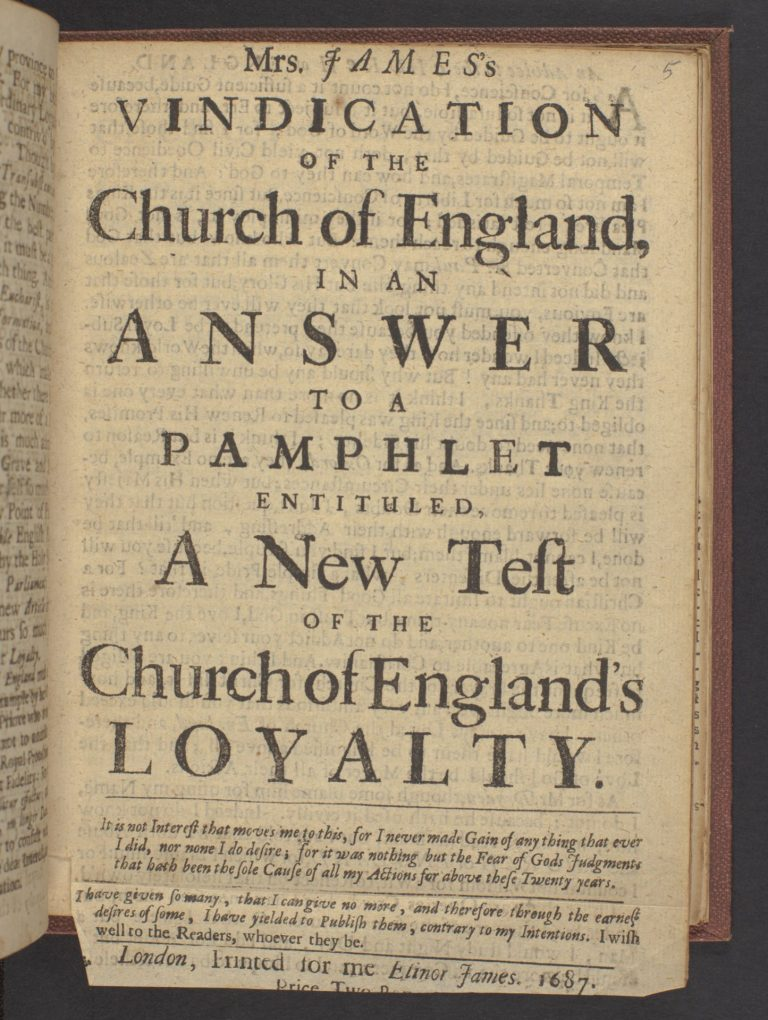
Mrs James’ Vindication of the Church of England (1687)

In 1687, Mrs. James's Vindication of the Church of England drew two responses. Both the satirical An Address of Thanks, on Behalf of the Church of England, to Mrs. James and the dismissive verse Elizabeth Rone's Short Answer to Elinor James's Long Preamble took her simplicity and prolixity to task. Furthermore, John Dryden dismissed her in the preface to The Hind and the Panther. At the same time she was protesting loudly against individual Puritan preachers, sometimes attending services personally and disrupting their sermons. She responded to Dryden and the others with Mrs. James's Defence of the Church of England, in a Short Answer to the Canting Address.

== Jacobite ==
Elinor James opposed William III, taking a Jacobite stance, for which she was arrested and placed in Newgate Prison, and tried and fined in 1689 for writing, printing and distributing a broadsheet accusing William III of ruling illegitimately. Still she did not relent. In 1702, one satirist referred to her as the "London City Godmother".

James wrote against Titus Oates, who figured in the Popish Plot, accusing him of being no minister of religion and fraudulently wearing clerical dress. He responded by beating her with his cane, for which he was found guilty of assault and fined. The fine was pointlessly substantial as Oates was poor and the fine was reduced.

In 1710, as executor of her husband's will, James donated 3000 of his books to Sion College, London, along with portraits of herself, her husband, Charles I and II. She died in 1719 and was buried on 19 July in London.

== See also ==
- List of women printers and publishers before 1800
