= Birgithe Kühle =

Norwegian journalist (1762–1832)

Birgithe Lykke Kühle, née Solberg (16 January 1762 in Copenhagen – 27 March 1832 in Sønderby), was a Danish-born Norwegian journalist and managing editor who has been referred to as the first female journalist in Norway. She and her husband, Carl Nicola, moved back to Denmark before the personal union between Denmark and Norway ended.

== Biography ==
Birgithe Kühle was the daughter of the Danish captain and merchant Søren Lykke Solberg (1732–1810) and Anne Marie Staal (1728–1832). In 1780, she married major Carl Nicolai Christian von Kühle (1748–1812), who was stationed in Bergen, Norway from 1786 to 1802.

She published the paper Provincial-Lecture in Bergen 1794–1795. The paper mainly consisted of translated popular science, novels and articles from English, French and German magazines.

She was also active as an actor and playwright for the amateur theatre Det Dramatiske Selskab in Bergen, which was founded and led by her spouse in 1794–1801. She returned to Denmark when her spouse had been given a position in Horsens in 1802. Her husband died in Horsens on 16 February 1812. Birgithe Kühle died in a home for widows on 27 March 1832 in a home for widows in Sønderby on Funen.

== See also ==
- List of women printers and publishers before 1800
