= Beatriz Cienfuegos =

Beatriz Cienfuegos (1701-1786) was a Spanish editor and journalist. She was the founder and publisher of the La Pensadora Gaditana (1763), the first paper edited by a woman in Spain, and has been referred to as the first Spanish journalist.

== See also ==
- List of women printers and publishers before 1800
