= Sarah Hyde =

Irish printer and bookseller

- Born: Sarah Ray
- Died: 15 November 1750; Donnybrook, Dublin

Sarah Hyde (died 15 November 1750) was an Irish printer and bookseller.

== Biography ==
Sarah Hyde was born Sarah Ray, the only daughter of Dublin booksellers and printers Joseph and Elizabeth Ray. Nothing is known about her life until her marriage to the printer and bookseller, John Hyde, on 18 June 1714.

Following her husband's death in November 1728, Hyde took over their business on Dame Street, continuing to supply stationery to Trinity College until 1747. From 1728 to 1732, she rented the printing house in the Stationers' Hall, Cork Hill with Eliphal Dobson II who had been in a loose partnership with Hyde's husband. Hyde continued with partnership with Dobson's widow, Jane, until 1734. When there was a dispute between the London printer, Benjamin Motte, and George Faulkner over the rights to publish the work of Jonathan Swift in London resulted in Hyde relaying Motte's correspondence to Swift in 1733. Her husband had dealings with Swift and had been well regarded by him. She published Swift's On Poetry in 1734, a version that has been studied in comparison to other contemporary printed versions.

Hyde ceased the printing element of her business some point before October 1734, when she let her press and premises to Richard Reilly, continuing as a bookseller. Reilly printed some worker for her such as Whole proceeding of the siege of Drogheda (Dublin, 1735) by N. Bernard, which had been out of print for a long time. In the 1730s and 1740s she was involved in collaborative ventures with other printers. Along with having more stable relationships with one or two other printers, this sort of ad hoc publishing relationship with individual printers was very common in the book trade in Dublin at that time.

She moved premises to Dame Street in January 1745. She announced her intention to quit her business on 28 March 1749 edition of the Dublin Journal. All of her stock was auctioned in April 1749, and she sought payment of all debts by July 1749. She died on 15 November 1750 in Donnybrook, Dublin. Her prerogative will mentioned one son, Thomas, and four daughters.

== See also ==
- List of women printers and publishers before 1800
