= Michelle Nicod =

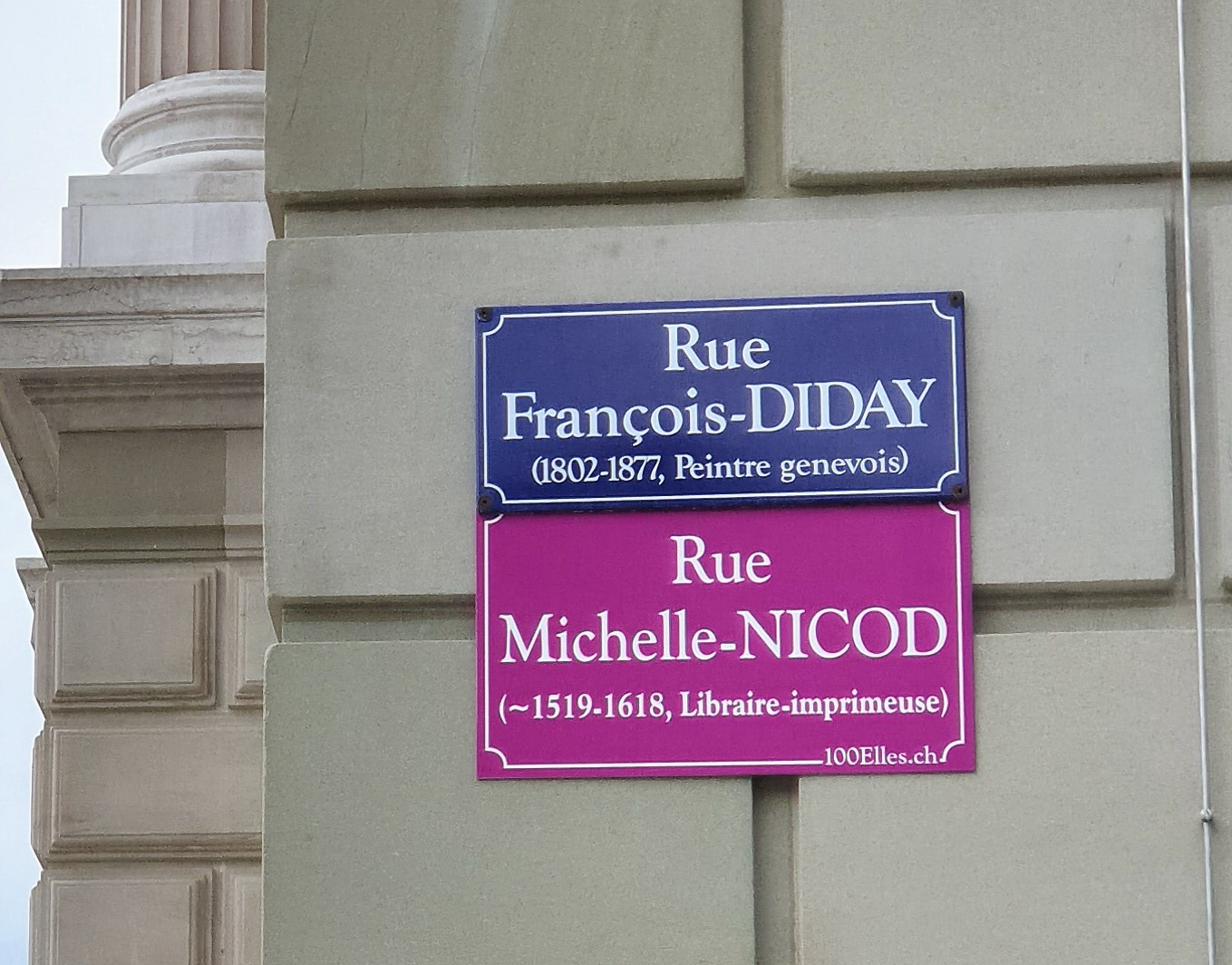
- Rue Michelle Nicod, Geneva
- Born: 1519; Cumigny, France
- Died: January 3, 1618; Geneva, Republic of Geneva
- Citizenship: Genevan (since 1556)
- Occupations: Printer, publisher
- Known for: Publishing legal, religious, and medical works in Geneva
- Spouse(s): Jean Durant (1556; d. 1585); Olivier Dagonneau (1591)

Michelle Nicod (1519 – 3 January 1618) was a book printer and publisher, active in Geneva in 1585–1618.

Michelle Nicod was born in Cumigny. She was married to the book printer and publisher Jean Durant (d. 1585) and took over his business as a widow. She printed and published medicinal, legal and religious works as well as laws for the city of Geneva. She is well documented for her many business transactions and lawsuits with the Protestant Church authorities. She died in Geneva, aged about 99.

== See also ==
- List of women printers and publishers before 1800
