= Anna van Westerstee Beek =

Dutch publisher of maps

Anna Beek née Anna van Westerstee (25 November 1657, The Hague - after October 1717, The Hague), was a Dutch publisher of maps.

== Early life ==
Anna van Westerstee (later known as Anna Beek) was born on 25 November 1657 in The Hague, Dutch Republic, to Frederick van Westerstee and Anna van Alphen. She married the publisher and art dealer Barent Beek in 1678, aged about 20–21, and together they had seven children. She later divorced him and the local courts supported her running the family business. Since at least 1697 she often used her maiden name "Van Westerstee" again.

== Career ==
Most of the maps Beek produced are city and battle plans, which are mapping naval and ground troop movements. The War of the Spanish Succession began in 1701 and the majority of the maps she sold were of key moments, providing news of events in real time. Several reference books consider her the engraver of some of the works she published.

Thirty maps produced by Beek are part of the Geography and Map Division's collection at the U.S. Library of Congress.

== Death ==
Beek died in 1717 in The Hague, Dutch Republic, aged 59 or 60.

== See also ==
- List of women printers and publishers before 1800
