= Maria Theresia Borrekens =

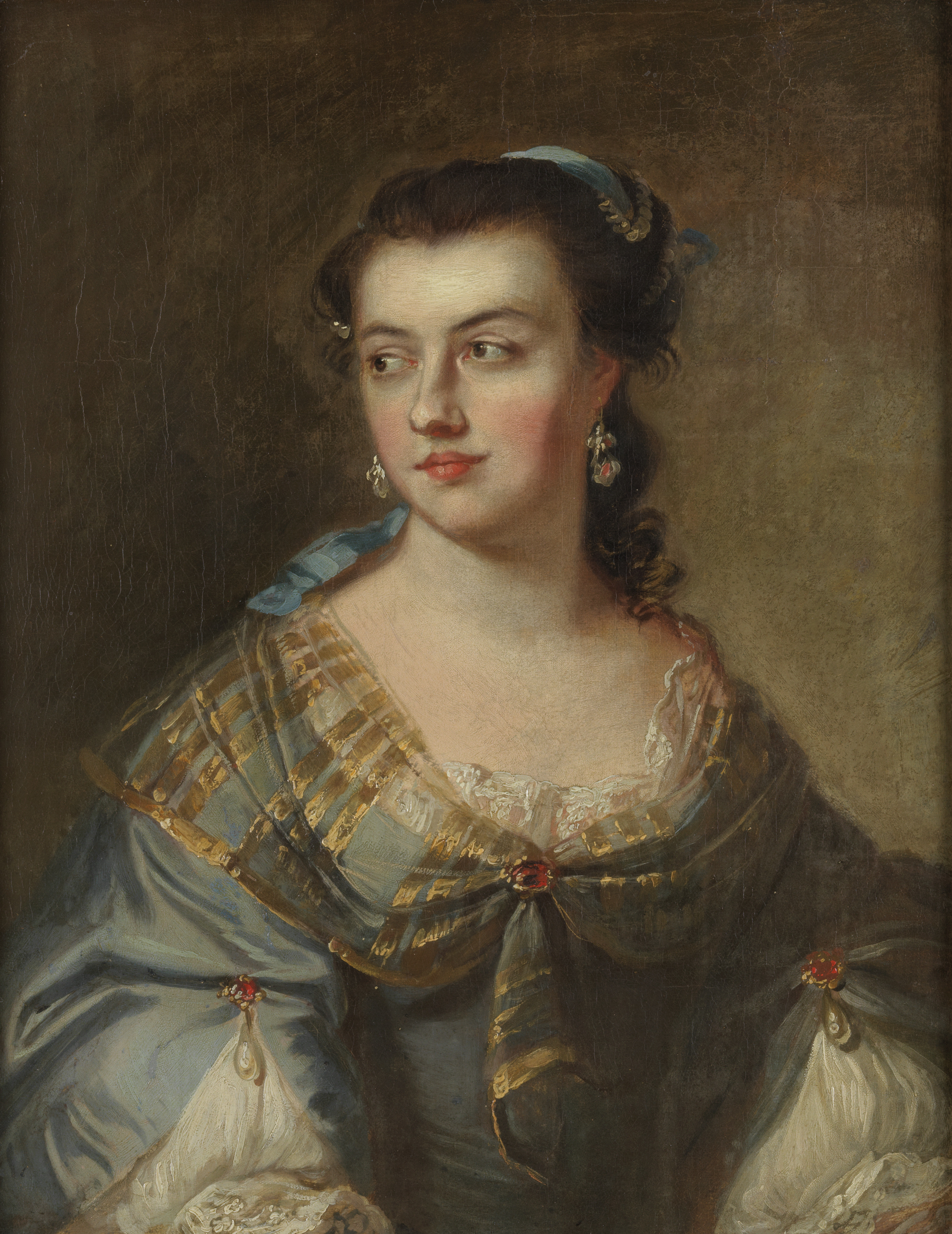
Philippe Joseph Tassaert, Portrait of Maria Theresia Borrekens, oil on canvas, Plantin-Moretus Museum, commissioned by her husband Franciscus Joannes Moretus in 1762.

Maria Theresia Borrekens (1728–1797), was a printer and manager of Officina Plantiniana (also known as Plantin Press), a leading publisher in Antwerp, from 1768 to 1797.

== Biography ==
Maria Theresia Josepha Borrekens was born on 27 July 1728 as the daughter of Engelbert Maria Josef Borrekens (ca. 1693–26 December 1748), a knight, and Maria Catherina Wellens (1705–1787). (Note: Both of her parents were buried at the Cathedral of Antwerp.) She was the second of eight children.

On 11 November 1750, she married Franciscus Joannes Moretus, whose parents were Theresia Mechtildis Schilders and Joannes Jacobus. Moretus studied philosophy at the University of Douai. In 1742, he acquired his law degree at the Old University of Leuven. He inherited the Officina Plantiniana, the leading Antwerp publishing house, on the death of his father.

Her husband was the head of the printing business beginning in 1757. Most of the firm's business came from printing Catholic service-books for Spain, but King Charles III of Spain withdrew privileges of foreign printers in 1764 which had devastating consequences to the firm. In 1758, there were eleven printing presses and in July 1765, there were only three printing presses in operation. He was chief almoner in Antwerp. In 1768, Franciscus Joannes Moretus died.

After her husband died, Borrekens took over the management of the printing house. She became a formidable leader of the firm, but due to external forces she was not able to overcome the financial downturn that beset the business. She had difficulty attaining an honest and expeditious engraver for the press, so that some publications had mediocre illustrations, or publications were delayed for years. In 1794, Antwerp was invaded by the French and many of its citizens left in exile. It is not clear if she left the city, but she did not send correspondence from Antwerp for six months.

She died on 5 May 1797. Borrekens was one of four women who operated the family printing shop over three centuries, the others, all members of the Plantin-Moretus family, were Martina Plantin (1550 – 1616), Anna Goos (1627 – 1691), and Anna Maria de Neuf (1654 – 1714).

Borrekens and her husband had thirteen children, seven of whom died young. At the time of her husband's death, there were five sons and a one-year-old daughter. Daughter Maria-Mechtildis-Jozefa was born on 7 March 1769, following her father's death. Three of their sons ran Officiana Plantiniana: Jacob Paul Moretus (died 1808), Jozef Moretus (died 1814), and Lodewijk-Frans Moretus (died 1820). After Borrekens' death, Jacob Paul ran the print shop until his death in 1808. Jozef then ran the business until his death, followed by Lodewijk-Frans. Although metal printing presses were in vogue in the 18th century, however, the Moretus family did not modernize. As a result, their business fell of and it became a "third-rate concern".

== See also ==
- List of women printers and publishers before 1800
