= Sarah Harding (printer) =

Irish printer and publisher

- Born: Sarah Sadlier
- Known for: publishing A modest proposal

Sarah Harding (fl. 1721–9) was an Irish printer and publisher who suffered "inopportune imprisonments" for some of her publications. She is known for publishing Jonathan Swift's A modest proposal in 1729 (A satirical idea that the poor could sell their children as food).

== Biography ==
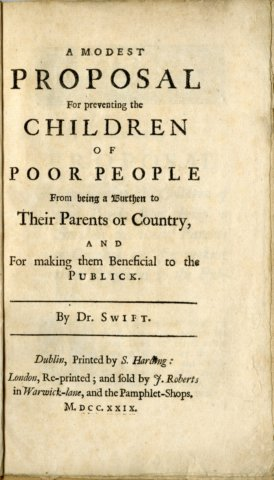
A Modest Proposal 1729 Cover, London imprint

Sarah Harding was the wife and business partner of printer John Harding near Fishamble Street, on the Blind Quay, Dublin. Her mother was a well-known Dublin printer, Elizabeth Sadlier, and it is possible that it was this connection that drew John into the printing business. Following her husband's imprisonment for publishing an unauthorised version of the lord lieutenant's speech on the opening of the parliamentary session, Harding took over the printing business. Her first publication was a pamphlet, The present miserable state of Ireland (1721), that is occasionally attributed to Jonathan Swift.

Her husband was released in 1721, and employed by Swift to publish a half-page protest against the proposed bank of Ireland. It was not for the Hardings' skill or refinement as printers that Swift chose them, but due to their willingness to "issue ephemeral, adventurous, even dangerous papers of controversy". The Hardings risked prosecution again after John's publishing of Swift's Drapier's Letters, with the couple arrested and put on trial in November 1724, but were not convicted. John Harding died on 19 April 1725, with Harding giving birth to a son, provocatively named John Draper Harding, in May 1725.

Harding continued the printing business after her husband's death, and retained Swift as a client. Under her mother's imprint, possibly to distance herself from the Drapier incident, she published a poem in 1726. She was imprisoned again briefly for publishing On wisdoms defeat in a learned debate (1725) which was deemed "an impudent and insolent paper", and is attributed at times to Swift. In 1728 she published Swift's A short view of the present state of Ireland and the periodical, The Intelligencer, edited by Swift and Thomas Sheridan. It is thought they chose Harding due to her past service and poverty. Sheridan wrote in an edition of the periodical: "that the widow, the printer of these papers, who did likewise print the Drapier's letters, must be enabled by charitable encouragements to keep a merry Christmas, for she and her family were ruined by inopportune imprisonments and hardship for printing those papers, which were to the advantage of the kingdom in general".

Her last major publication was in 1729, with Swift's A modest proposal. After this, Swift used the printer George Faulkner. Harding remarried, marrying Nicholas Hussey, a fellow Dublin printer. Her date of death is unknown.

== See also ==
- List of women printers and publishers before 1800
