= Ruth Graisberry =

Irish printer

- Born: Ruth McCormack or McCormick
- Died: early 1842; Dublin, Ireland
- Known for: university printer for Trinity College Dublin

Ruth Graisberry (died early 1842) was an Irish printer and the university printer for Trinity College Dublin.

== Life ==
Ruth Graisberry was born Ruth McCormack or McCormick. In May 1797, she married Daniel Graisberry, son of printers Daniel and Mary Graisberry. The couple had five daughters. The Graisberrys were partnered with Daniel's brother-in-law, Richard Campbell, working from a premises on Back Lane, Dublin. From 1807, they were appointed the university printer for Trinity College Dublin, with Graisberry printing exclusively for the university. After the death of her husband in February 1822, Graisberry succeeded her husband in the printing business after a successful petition to the university to retain her. In this, she was backed by leading figures in Dublin's printing trade, and cited her need to support her daughters and her elderly mother as grounds for them to continue to employ her.

Some time before 1824, the partnership left Back Lane, with Graisberry going into partnership with Michael Gill in 1833. Gill came into the firm as an apprentice when he was 19, going on to manage the college press from 1827 and a full partner from 1833. He bought the business from Graisberry in 1837. Grasiberry had been suffering from a long illness when she died at some point before 1 July 1842.

Some of the Graisberry & Campbell ledgers from the late 1700s and early 1800s are held by the Library of Trinity College Dublin.
