= Anne Dodd =

British publisher (1685–1739)

Anne (Barnes) Dodd (c. 1685–1739) was the most famous English news seller and pamphlet shop proprietor in the 18th century. In 1708, she married a Nathaniel Dodd, who had purchased a stationer's license. Nathaniel and Anne set up their shop at the sign of the Peacock outside Temple Bar in late 1711, and the shop would operate successfully for nearly half a century afterward.

Nathaniel was the de jure owner of the business, but Anne's was the only name to appear on the imprints for the wholesale and retail sale of newspapers and pamphlets. Nathaniel would purchase newspapers and pamphlets in bulk from printers and then sell them to the street hawkers as well as offer them to public sale in the shop at the Peacock. In October 1723, Nathaniel died, and Anne became the legal as well as effective owner of the business.

During this period, printers and book sellers, as well as authors, were prosecuted for dissemination of politically vexatious works. The government summoned Nathaniel Dodd twice, once in connection with Nathaniel Mist's Mist's Weekly Journal, and Anne Dodd was similarly prosecuted. She was imprisoned in 1728 for selling anti-ministry pamphlets, and she made the plea at the time that she carried and sold many more pro-ministry papers than anti-ministry ones and that she was merely selling what the people wanted. Also in 1728, Alexander Pope feigned the imprint of Anne Dodd for the early versions of The Dunciad, probably as an extension of the poem's parody of the emerging culture of hack-written political papers rather than as a satire on Mrs. Dodd herself.

When she died in October 1739, she left very generous sums to her three daughters. To her eldest daughter, already married, she left £500, and she left her two younger daughters £600 each, as well as her jewels and the shop lease. Her youngest daughter, also named Anne, continued operating the shop, and Henry Fielding refers to the impressive array of dour looking newspapers stacked in the racks of Anne Dodd's shop in The Covent Garden Journal in 1752.

== See also ==
- List of women printers and publishers before 1800
