= Juana Millán =

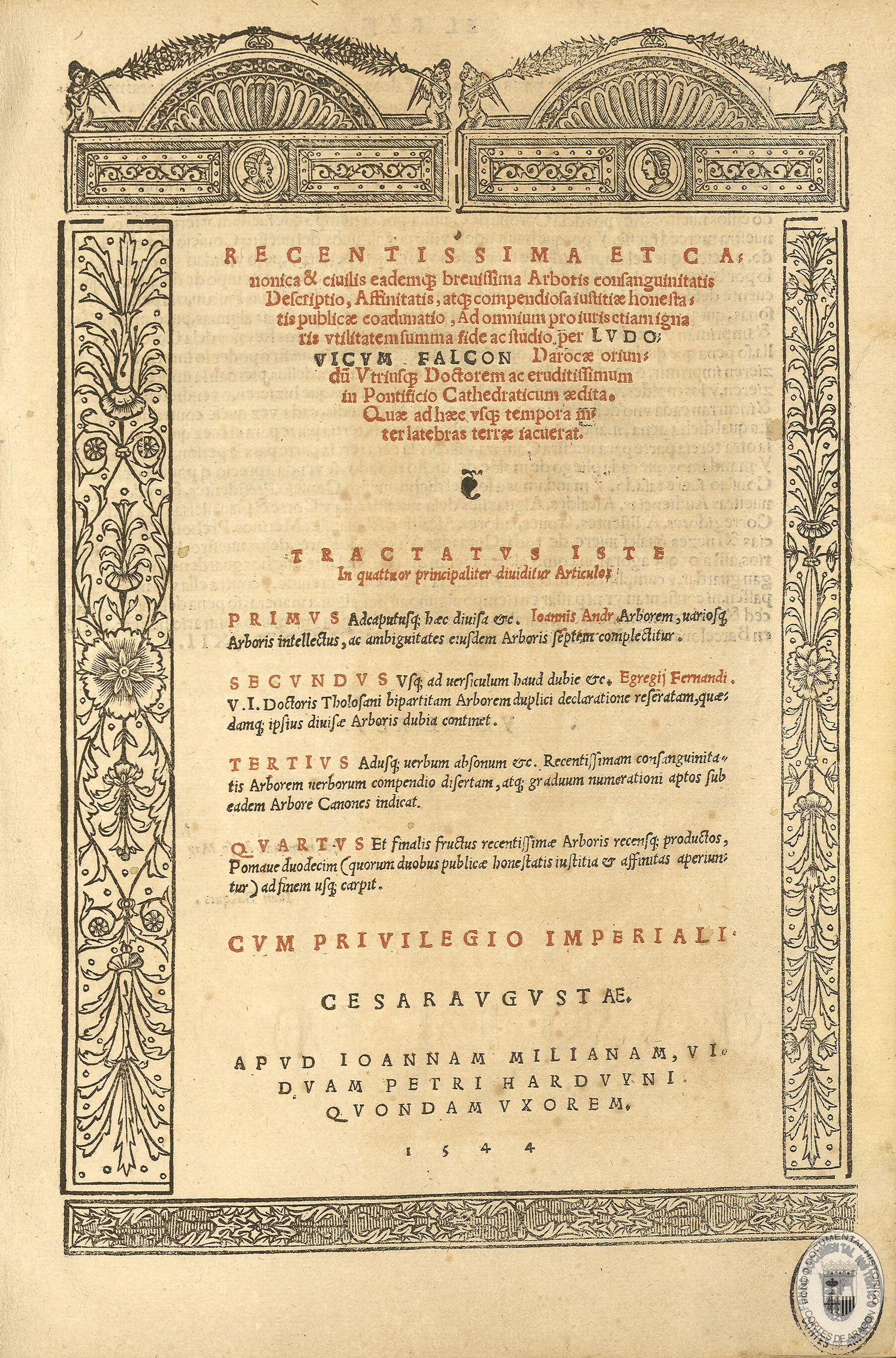
Juana Millán publication, 1544

Juana Millán (died after 1550) was a Spanish book printer.

Millán was the first female printer to have published herself under her own name in Spain, as well as being one of the first female printers in Spain. She managed the Zaragoza printing business of her late spouse Pedro Hardouin (d. 1536) from 1536 to 1545, and again after the death of her second spouse in 1549.

== See also ==
- List of women printers and publishers before 1800
