= Yolande Bonhomme =

- Born: c. 1490
- Died: c. 1557
- Occupation: Printer

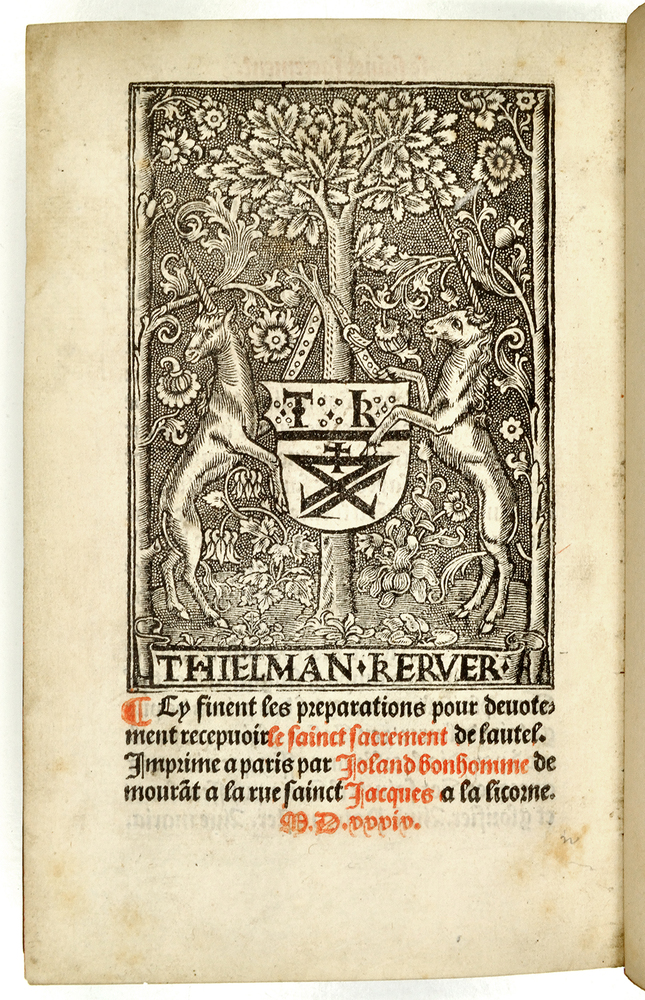
Colophon of a devotional printed by Bonhomme under her husband's mark in 1539.

Yolande Bonhomme (c. 1490 – 1557) was a French printer and seller of liturgical and devotional books in Paris. She was among a handful of important female book printers in Paris during this time, including Charlotte Guillard, Françoise Louvain and Marie L'Angelier.

She was the daughter of Pasquier Bonhomme, himself a printer and one of four appointed booksellers of the University of Paris, and the wife of another printer, Thielmann Kerver. She began printing on her own following her husband's death in 1522 in their shop at street level in the Hôtel Unicorn on the Rue Saint-Jacques, Paris. The University of Paris and the Catholic Church were among her patrons. She published a book of hours in 1523 and another in 1546; both books survive. In 1526, she became the first woman to publish the Bible. She also published the Roman Breviary (Latin: Breviarium Romanum) in 1534 and a Breviarium Romanum nuper reformatum in 1537. She joined forces with Charlotte Guillard to demand better quality paper from the papermakers' guild. Estimates of her output range from 136 (according to Axel Erdmann) to 200 (according to Beatrice Beech, based on Renouard) publications before her own death in 1557. Because she often used her husband's name on the colophon for early books, her identity as the printer can be difficult to pinpoint.

== See also ==
- List of women printers and publishers before 1800
