= Sara Johanna de Beer =

Surinamese printer and editor of a number of newspapers and magazines

Sara Johanna de Beer (Paramaribo, 1749/1750 – died in Paramaribo after 1811) was a printer and editor of a number of newspapers and magazines in the Dutch colony of Surinam.

== Biography ==
De Beer was born in Paramaribo in 1749 or 1750, on her parents' plantation Berenrust. Her father was Joost de Beer (d. 1756), and her mother was Anna Cornelia van Echten (1716–1782). Her father died when she was around six, and her mother remarried, with Pieter van Akeren (d. 1779), who owned the Dordrecht plantation. On 10 June 1763, Sara left for the Netherlands, with her slave Dido, followed by her mother and sister in May 1766. What they did in the Netherlands is unknown, but all four returned to Surinam in October 1767.

Early in 1773 Sara registered her intention to marry Nicolaas Vlier, a man twenty years her senior, and they got married on Dordrecht a few weeks later. Their family quickly grew to include six children. In 1774, the couple started De Weeklyksche Woensdaagsche Surinaamse Courant, the first and only newspaper of the colony until 1785. In 1776, they bought the first printing house in Suriname.

When her husband died in 1781, she continued the business, and used her name on the newspapers. During the 1780s the business got into financial problems, and de Beer had to sell off some slaves "who could read and write." De Beer published at least six newspapers, but often received warnings from the government, and at least one publication ban.

== See also ==
- List of women printers and publishers before 1800

== Sources ==
- Sens, Angelie (2004). "'Eerstelingen van Surinaamsche couranten': De vroege Surinaamse pers, 1774-1816". In Sens, Angelie (ed.). K'ranti! De Surinaamse pers 1774-2008. KIT. pp. 15–36. ISBN 9789039336236.
