= Ann Lea =

British lithographer, map and globe seller and publisher

Ann Lea, sometimes "Anne", (1661–1728) was a British lithographer, map and globe seller and publisher in London. She prepared maps for several works including Christopher Saxton's The Traveller's Guide being the best map of the Kingdom of England and Principality of Wales (20 sheets) and Robert Morden's A new mapp of the West-Indies, or the islands of America 1702.

She was born Anne Fitz or Fitch in Southwark about 1661 to William Fitch. In 1684 she married mapmaker, globemaker and bookseller Philip Lea. Ann took over the business from her husband upon his death in 1700. At that time and place it was illegal for married women to own businesses, but unmarried women (including widows) could.

Lea operated her business at the Atlas & Hercules, Cheapside, near Friday Street from 1701 to 1716 and at the Atlas & Hercules, over against Salisbury Court, in Fleet Street 1720 to 1725. She died in 1728 around the age of 73. Her stock and plates were auctioned in 1730, with many acquired by John and Thomas Bowles and George Willdey.

== See also ==
- List of women printers and publishers before 1800
