= Catharina Egges =

Dutch publisher

Catharina Egges (1750 - 1824), was a Dutch publisher. Between 1781 and 1824, she managed the publishing company Algemeene bibliotheek.

== Biography ==
Egges was born on January 4, 1750, in Wijdenes. Her parents were the minister Johannes Egges and Guurtje de Groot. Her father died as early as 1760. Not long after, her mother moved away from Wijdenes with her five children. In 1766, Egges went to live with her aunt Bregje de Groot in Medemblik, and a year later she married the Haarlem merchant Willem Climmer Cloek, who died in 1769. She remarried a few months later to Jan Dóll, who had just started as a publisher and bookseller in Amsterdam. When Dóll died in 1781, Egges continued the bookstore under the name Wed. J. Dóll for more than 40 years, assisted by 3 of her 5 children, including Catharina Maria Doll Egges .

== See also ==
- List of women printers and publishers before 1800
