= Philip Lea =

English cartographer, globemaker, instrument maker and publisher

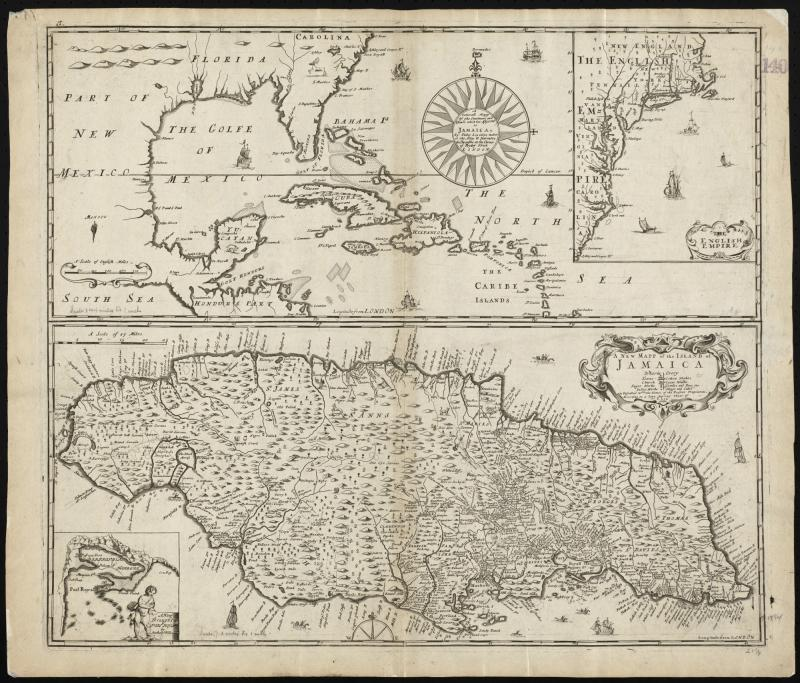
A general mapp of the continent and islands which bee adjacent to Jamaica by P. Lea, 1688

Philip Lea (c. 1660? – 1700) was an English cartographer, globemaker, instrument maker, and publisher. He was a prolific printer and reviser of maps, frequently collaborating with other contemporary mapmakers (or buying their plates from them and creating updated editions) including Herman Moll, Robert Morden (with whom he sold globes), John Ogilby, and John Seller.

With Robert Morden he produced in 1683 A New Terrestrial Globe made by Rt. Morden, Wm. Berry, Ph. Lea. With John Ogilby he published in 1687 the Travellers Guide being the best Mapp of the Kingdom of England and Principality of Wales. Also in 1687 with John Overton he published A new mapp of America. With Christopher Saxton he revised and re-issued in 1693 The Shires of England and Wales.

Between about 1683 and 1686, he worked at the Atlas & Hercules in the Poultry district of London (over against Old Jewry). From 1687 to his death he worked at the Atlas & Hercules in Cheapside near Friday Street, London though between 1689 and 1695 his location was sometimes described as "and at Westminster Hall near the Court of Common Pleas."

Lea was apprenticed through the guild The Worshipful Company of Weavers in 1675 with Robert Morden.

Lea died in 1700. His widow Ann Lea took over the business and ran it for another 25 years.
