= Salomè Antonazzoni =

Italian stage actress

Salomè Antonazzoni also known as Valeria Austori (fl. 1619 – fl. 1642) was an Italian stage actress.

She was sister to the actor Francesco Antonazzoni and married the actor Giovan Geronimo Favella.

She was engaged in the famous theatre company i Confidenti of Flaminio Scala, which toured in Lucca and Florence under the patronage of Giovanni de' Medici. She was the leading lady of the company with Marina Dorotea Antonazzoni, but their rivalry resulted in her being replaced by Maria Malloni in 1619. After this, she was active in the company of her spouse in Naples.

When she was widowed in 1642, she took over the printing press of her late spouse and developed his pamphlets in to a paper, making her one of the pioneer female journalists, editors and printing press managers in Italy.

== See also ==
- List of women printers and publishers before 1800
