= Francisca de Aculodi =

Spanish editor and journalist

- Born: Francisca de Aculodi; 1700s Donostia Basque Country
- Died: 1800s N/A
- Occupations: Journalist; editor
- Known for: Founding and publishing the San Sebastian newspaper Noticias Principales y Verdaderas

Francisca de Aculodi (fl. 1689) was a Spanish editor and journalist. When her spouse died in 1678, she inherited his printing privilege and title of “Impresora de la Muy Noble y Muy Leal Provincia de Guipúzcoa”. She founded and published the San Sebastián newspaper Noticias Principales y Verdaderas from 1683. doi:10.4000/argonauta.431. She has been referred to as the first female journalist in Europe, prior to Elizabeth Mallet, founder of the Daily Courant in 1702.

== See also ==
- List of women printers and publishers before 1800
