= Mary Clark (printer) =

- Occupation: Printer
- Years active: 1677 - 1696
- Known for: Printing and publishing

Mary Clark was a printer and publisher who operated on Aldersgate Street, London, from 1677 to 1696.

== Life and career ==
Operating her shop on Aldersgate Street, Clark oversaw the printing and publication of over 100 imprints. The print shop was established by her husband, Andrew Clark. After his death in 1677, Clark continued to run the shop herself until 1696. At the time, in 17th-century London, it was unusual for a woman to own and operate a print shop. She was aided by her manager, Ben Motte, who was also her son-in-law and later would become her successor.

Of books she printed, one notable volume was the 4th edition of Part 2 of Abraham Cowley's Works, published by Charles Harper and Jacob Tonson.

== See also ==
- List of women printers and publishers before 1800
