= Magdalena Morhart =

German printer (c. 1505 to 1574)

- Born: Magdalena Kirsenmann
- Occupation: printer

Magdalena Morhart (born c. 1505 as Magdalena Kirschmann; † died 1574) was a German printer in Tübingen. She printed nearly 500 titles, including titles for the University and the Württemberg government.

== Biography ==
Magdalena Kirschmann was born as daughter of Anna Breuning and Oswald Kirschmann. Her first husband was Jakob Gruppenbach, with whom she had at least four sons: Oswald, Jakob and Georg Gruppenbach and another. After Gruppenbach's death in 1540 she married Ulrich Morhart, who already had opened a printing press in Tübingen in 1523. With Ulrich Morhart, she had at least one daughter, Magdalena the Younger.

Ulrich Morhart died in 1554 and Magdalena Morhart continued to work in the print shop. There were several challenges, such as the dispute with her stepson, Ulrich the Younger. He made claim to the print shop, but Magdalena Morhart was able to prevail, which led to a rift between the two. In addition, the plague broke out in Tübingen at the end of 1554, which made the completion of print jobs considerably more difficult.

A few months after the death of Ulrich Morhart, a printer from Ulm came to Tübingen and asked the university for a loan so that he could operate his own printing press in Tübingen. He assured that he would not harm the heirs of Ulrich Morhart, but the university senate, which was responsible for the control of the book trade in Tübingen, rejected his request nevertheless.

Magdalena Mohrhart probably employed several journeymen. Whether she was allowed to employ apprentices is unclear. Most likely, her four sons and her daughter Magdalena the Younger helped in the print shop. Georg Gruppenbach delivered the books to the court in Stuttgart and received the payments. Oswald and Georg Gruppenbach printed in their own and were partly involved in the production by Magdalena Morhart, "nevertheless, most books were still produced by 'Ulrich Morharts Witfrau..' [Magdelena Morhart]." In 1554, two titles of her print shop were confiscated for violating censorship laws. In 1563, Sebastian Mayr, whose treatise Morhart printed, failed to obtain approval from the censors. The Duke of Württemberg stated that Morhart should be punished as a printer. What punishment this was is unknown.

Despite these obstacles, her print shop was financially successful. Morhart printed important legal works, such as the Landrecht of Württemberg (VD16 W4513), which became a model for other territories. "Magdalena Morhart expanded the business and from the 1560s (at the latest), provided the service of book binding as well." This service flourished even after the takeover by Georg Gruppenbach.

== See also ==
- List of women printers and publishers before 1800
