= Jane Jones (printer) =

Irish printer and bookseller

- Died: 1739
- Known for: printer, bookseller, owner of Dublin Evening Post

Jane Jones (died 1739) was an Irish printer, bookseller, and newspaper proprietor.

== Life ==
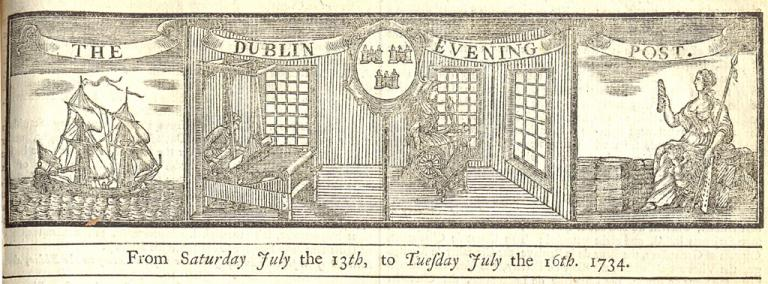
Masthead for the Dublin Evening Post in 1734

Jane Jones was the wife of Theophilus Jones, a bookseller, printer, newspaper proprietor and possible descendant of Sir Theophilus Jones. She is described as a "lady of birth." After Jones was widowed in April 1736, she announced that she would continue her husband's business to support her large family. She continued to print the Dublin Evening Post from Clarendon Street until 31 March 1739. She also published Life of Prince Eugene of Saxony (1737), Amusements de Spa by Karl Ludwig von Pöllnitz (1737), Complete English tradesmen by Daniel Defoe (1738), and a Letter to a lady, in praise of female learning by Wetenhall Wilkes (1739). Jones started work on the History of the bishops of Ireland by Sir James Ware in 1739, but died in May of that year before she could complete it. Her daughter, Elizabeth, took over the business, possibly with the help of two of her sisters. They continued to operate from Clarendon Street for a further two years, printing the full set of Ware's works along with History of the civil wars of France by Enrico Caterino Davila (1740). Elizabeth Jones married an engraver, Thomas Dixon, in 1756, by which time she had ceased working as a printer or bookseller.

== See also ==
- List of women printers and publishers before 1800
