= Isabel Jolís Oliver =

Catalan printer and engraver

Isabel Jolis Oliver
- Born: Same As Normal; 1682; Barcelona
- Died: 1770 (aged 87–88); N/A
- Other names: N/A
- Occupation: Printing Press/ Engraver
- Years active: 88 Years
- Known for: Woman Printer and Publisher
- Notable work: the second edition of the Miguel de Cervantes novel Don Quijote, in 1762,

Isabel Jolís Oliver (1682–1770), was a Catalan printer and engraver.

She was born to Joan Jolís Santjaume (died 1705), printer in Barcelona, and Maria Oliver. She never married, and after the death of her childless brother Juan in 1759, she took over the family printing press company at the age of 77. She used the imprint ”Hereus de Joan Jolís” (Heirs of Joan Jolís). The company had three printing presses and was a significant company. She printed the second edition of the Miguel de Cervantes novel Don Quijote, in 1762, and printed for the seminary and the Episcopal Palace of Barcelona. She was also active as an engraver, trained by her father, and many works of her production as an engraver survives. She left the company to her student, Bernat Pla. The company remained active until the early 20th century.

== See also ==
- List of women printers and publishers before 1800
