= Dinah Nuthead =

17th-century printer of colonial Maryland

- Born: Anne Arundel County, Maryland
- Other names: Dinah Devoran; Dinah Oley
- Known for: first woman licensed as a printer in the 13 Colonies
- Spouses: William Nuthead; Manus Devoran; Sebastian Oley of Annarund
- Children: William Nuthead; Susannah Nuthead; Sebastian Oley

Dinah Nuthead (fl. 1696) was a colonial printer based in the Province of Maryland. She is believed to be the first woman to be licensed as a printer in the Thirteen Colonies.

Nuthead was born in Anne Arundel County, Maryland. Her husband, William Nuthead, established the second colonial printing business in Jamestown, Virginia, in 1682. They moved to St. Mary's City, Maryland, in 1686 and established a press that primarily printed government forms.

Following her husband's death in 1695, Nuthead appeared before the Prerogative Court and requested that she be appointed administrator of his estate. John Coode was one of the sureties in her bond. She inherited the press and took over the business. Within a year, the government moved to Annapolis, and Nuthead moved her press there as well.

Nuthead petitioned the Maryland General Assembly on May 5, 1696, to grant her a license to print blank forms for the province's public offices as well as writs, bonds, bills, and warrants of attorney. The petition was read to the delegates eight days later. She was required to pay a security of £100 and was granted a license that allowed her to run the press. Nuthead was the first woman to run a printing press outside of Massachusetts and the first woman to be licensed as a printer in the colonies. Only five blank forms attributed to Nuthead's Annapolis press are extant. Many sources indicate that Nuthead was illiterate. She was apparently unable to sign her name, having been compelled to make her mark instead on a government document.

Nuthead had two children by her first husband, William and Susannah. She remarried, to Manus Devoran (d. December 1700). Sometime after his death, she married Sebastian Oley of Annarund (d. 1707). She had her third child, Sebastian, with him.

== See also ==
- List of women printers and publishers before 1800
