= Alice Reilly =

Irish printer and publisher

- Born: Alice Abbot; 1701/1702
- Died: 19 April 1778 (aged 76); Dublin, Ireland
- Known for: Printer and publisher

Alice Reilly (1701/1702 – 19 April 1778) was an Irish printer and publisher.

== Biography ==
Alice Reilly was born Alice Abbot in 1701 or 1702. She married the printer and publisher Richard Reilly on 10 October 1733, and after his death in July 1741, took over his business. She paid quarterage fees to the printers guild, the Guild of St Luke the Evangelist, but could not be a full member as she was a woman. From 1741 to 1762 she was a tenant at the Guild in Stationers Hall, Skinner Row, a building that was demolished as part of the Wide Streets Commission in June 1762. She then operated from Temple Bar from 1763 to 1767. Having created a large successful business, it was housed on guild premises and she took on apprentices recognised by the guild including her nephew John Abbott Husband. In 1776 she is listed as having six apprentices and seven journeymen.

She published the Dublin News-Letter, which had been renamed The Oracle under her husband. She co-published this with Edward Exshaw from 1741 to 1744. With Exshaw, Reilly was appointed by the Dublin Society as their official printers on 24 March 1743, on terms that Reilly's husband had agreed. The Dublin News-Letter was effectively the Society's publication, and contained their notices and transactions, which guaranteed Reilly a regular income, with 500 issues printed twice weekly. She also published a range of books, produced for Exshaw and others, as well as book catalogues in 1775 and 1760. Reilly started publishing The Dublin Courant in April 1744, selling it to Oliver Nelson in September 1745. Reilly was one of many Dublin printers and stationers who wrote in protest against unlicensed individuals participating in their trade in 1766, but this did not remedy the situation. Reilly died in Dublin on 19 April 1778, having retired around 1767.

== See also ==
- List of women printers and publishers before 1800
