= Marguerite Pagès-Marinier =

French journalist and editor (1725–1786)

Marguerite Pagès-Marinier (1725-1786), was a French journalist and editor.

She was born to the farm laborer Antoine Pagès and Louise Doulzague. In 1760, she married the shoemaker Pierre Marinier of Montpellier. In 1770, she was noted to be active as a dentist.

She was the director and chief editor of the Annonces, affiches et avis divers de Montpellier of Montpellier in 1770–1776. Her paper Annonces, affiches et avis divers de Montpellier was successful, but she was forced to close it down because she lacked the necessary permits. She resumed her publication under the new name Journal de la généralité de Montpellier. This was also successful, but she was again forced to stop publication because of permit issues in 1781.
