= Kunegunde Hergot =

- Died: February 7, 1547
- Occupation: Printer

Kunigunde Hergotin (also Kunigunde Hergot, Künegünd Hergotin, or Kunigunde Wachter; d. 7 February 1547) was a German printer active in Nuremberg. She is known as one of the first female printers.

== Biography ==
Hergotin's first husband, Hans Hergot, operated a printing office in Nuremberg between 1524 and 1527, which she managed during his frequent absences caused by work as an itinerant bookseller. Hans Hergot was executed in Leipzig on 20 May 1527 for having printed a seditious text, Von der newen Wandlung eynes christlichen Lebens. Thereafter Hergotin took over the business, and printed books in her own name. VD-16 (Verzeichnis der Drucke des 16. Jahrhunderts) records 178 editions printed in her name between 1525 and 1540.

On 15 December 1527, Hergotin married her second husband, Georg Wachter, who like her first husband was a printer. VD-16 lists 53 editions printed by Hergotin (using the name "Wachterin") or Wachter from 1528 to 1540.

== Printing programme ==
After her first husband's execution, Hergotin continued to print under his name and using his types, as well as taking over his specialisation in Protestant texts. About 20 editions of Luther appeared under her name, as well as an edition of the Old and New Testaments, and a wide range of ballads. Her press played an important role in the dissemination of Protestant and popular music. Besides these works, Hergotin printed shorter texts using her second husband's surname, while he printed in parallel in his name. Their practice of printing works from the same printing house under different names was unusual.

== Commemorations ==
Kunigunde Hergotin has been commemorated with a FrauenOrt in Nuremberg.

== Sources ==
- Classen, Albrecht. "Frauen als Buchdruckerinnen im deutschen Sprachraum des 16. und 17. Jahrhunderts". Gutenberg-Jahrbuch 75 (2000): 181–195.
- Göllner, Marie Louise (2001). "Hans Hergot". In Sadie, Stanley; Tyrrell, John (eds.). The New Grove Dictionary of Music and Musicians (2nd ed.). London: Macmillan. ISBN 978-1-56159-239-5.
- Hanisch, Evelyn; and Friederike Willasch. Frauen in einer Männerdomäne. Zwei Witwen in Nürnberg. Staatsbibliothek zu Berlin – Preußischer Kulturbesitz, 26 December 2018.
- Reske, Christoph. Die Buchdrucker des 16. und 17. Jahrhunderts im deutschen Sprachgebiet. 2nd ed. Wiesbaden: Harrassowitz, 2015.
- Sadie, Stanley; Tyrrell, John, eds. (2001). "Kunegunde Hergot". The New Grove Dictionary of Music and Musicians (2nd ed.). London: Macmillan. ISBN 978-1-56159-239-5.
- Wohnhaas, Theodor (2001). "Georg Wachter". In Sadie, Stanley; Tyrrell, John (eds.). The New Grove Dictionary of Music and Musicians (2nd ed.). London: Macmillan. ISBN 978-1-56159-239-5.
- Wohnhaas, Theodor; Jackson, Susan (2001). "Valentin Neuber". In Sadie, Stanley; Tyrrell, John (eds.). The New Grove Dictionary of Music and Musicians (2nd ed.). London: Macmillan. ISBN 978-1-56159-239-5.

== See also ==
- List of women printers and publishers before 1800
