= Machteld van Wouw =

Dutch printer and publisher

Machteld Aelbrechtsdr van Wouw (1580-1662) was a Dutch printer and publisher. She was the official state national publisher of the Dutch Republic between 1622 and 1662, with a monopoly on all government publications. She inherited the office from her late spouse Hillebrant Jacobsz. van Wouw (1577-1622), who in turn had inherited from her father Aelbrecht Hendricksz. van Leuningen (1545-1613).
