= Elisabeth Pickering =

- Born: c. 1510
- Died: 1562
- Burial place: St Dunstan-in-the-West Churchyard, London, England
- Occupation: Printer

Elisabeth Pickering (c. 1510–1562) was an English printer, the first woman in England to print books under her own family name.

== Biography ==
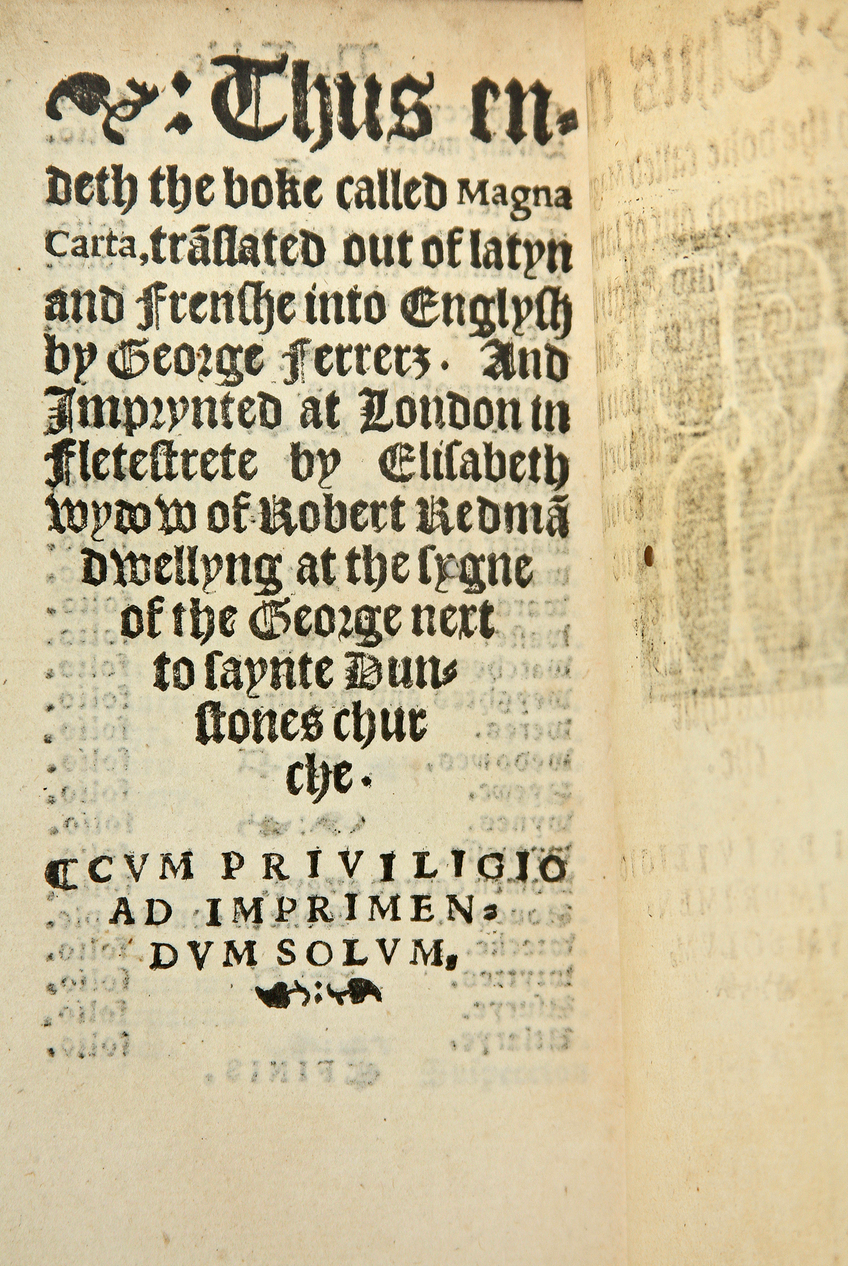
Colophon from The Great Charter, Called in Latin Magna Carta, London: Elizabeth Pickering, 1540/41

The parents and background of Pickering are unknown. Pickering is reputed by the Oxford Dictionary of National Biography to being the first English woman to print books under her birth name; James Raven asserts that "as early as 1527-8 a widow is recorded as printing in York", and terms Pickering as 'the best-known early press woman'.

Elisabeth Pickering was the wife and, on his death in October 1540, widow, of Robert Redman, a printer of law books in London from 1525 until his death. Thirteen editions of Redman's books were printed, eleven under Pickering's name, within nine-months of his death, including an edition of Magna Carta. After running the business from November 1540 to May 1541, she sold the printing business to William Middleton.

Pickering was married four times; to a Mr. Jackson, with issue Lucy and Elizabeth, prior to her marriage in 1537. to Redman, with issue Alice and Matilda. After Redman's death she married William Cholmeley, a lawyer who may, according to the ODNB, may have been involved in a 1542 attempt by the Worshipful Company of Stationers and Newspaper Makers to be incorporated in London. After William's death she married his relation Ranulph Cholmeley, who from 1553 to 1563 was Recorder of London and thereafter Chief Justice of the Common Pleas. This Cholmeley was responsible for the successful incorporation of the Stationers, and the ODNB suggests that Elisabeth's interest in the matter was related to both Cholmeley's actions.

Pickering died in October 1562. She is buried in St. Dunstan-in-the-West churchyard in London, England.

== See also ==
- List of women printers and publishers before 1800
