= Daniel Graisberry =

Irish printer

- Born: c. 1740; Drumcondra, Dublin, Ireland
- Died: 1785; Dublin
- Known for: printing

Daniel Graisberry (c. 1740 – 1785) was an Irish printer.

== Life ==
Daniel Graisberry was born in Drumcondra, Dublin around 1740. He was the son of William Graisberry, a printer, and Elizabeth Graisberry. He was admitted to the Guild of St Luke on 24 August 1775 having completed his apprenticeship under Hugh Grierson, the king's printer. He entered into a loose partnership with James Williams, a bookseller, from early 1778 to March 1781. Graisberry focused on printing while Williams was in charge of the retail business at 10 Back Lane, where Graisberry rented the premises for £45 a year. One of the books Graisberry is credited with is the 1776 eight volume Dublin printing of A History of Earth and Animated Nature by Oliver Goldsmith.

He married Mary Kennedy in July 1765, and the couple had at least 12 children. His death was announced mistakenly in the Dublin press in November 1772. On 6 February 1782, Graisberry was injured when the floor of the Music Hall in Fishamble Street collapsed during a guild meeting. He died on 26 December 1785, hours after the death of his mother. There was a monument erected to him in Drumcondra churchyard. His wife, Mary, took over the business after his death in partnership with her son-in-law Richard Campbell, the husband of Elizabeth Graisberry. Mary retired in 1797, and died at Back Lane in February 1822.

Their son, most likely the eldest, Daniel succeeded his mother in the printing business. He in turn was succeeded by his wife, Ruth.

Graisberry's ledgers from 1777–1785 were published in 1990, with the originals held in the archives of Trinity College Dublin.
