= Catharina Höök =

Swedish book printer

Catharina Höök (died 1727), was a Swedish book printer.

Höök married Henrik Keyser the Younger, the Royal Book Printer in Sweden. In 1697, Keyser received an order to publish the Bible of king Charles XII of Sweden. However, Keyser died in 1699 without completing the order.

After taking over her husband's post, Höök printed the Bible. She is best known for this accomplishment.
