= Ulrich Ferdinand Beenfeldt =

Danish portrait painter

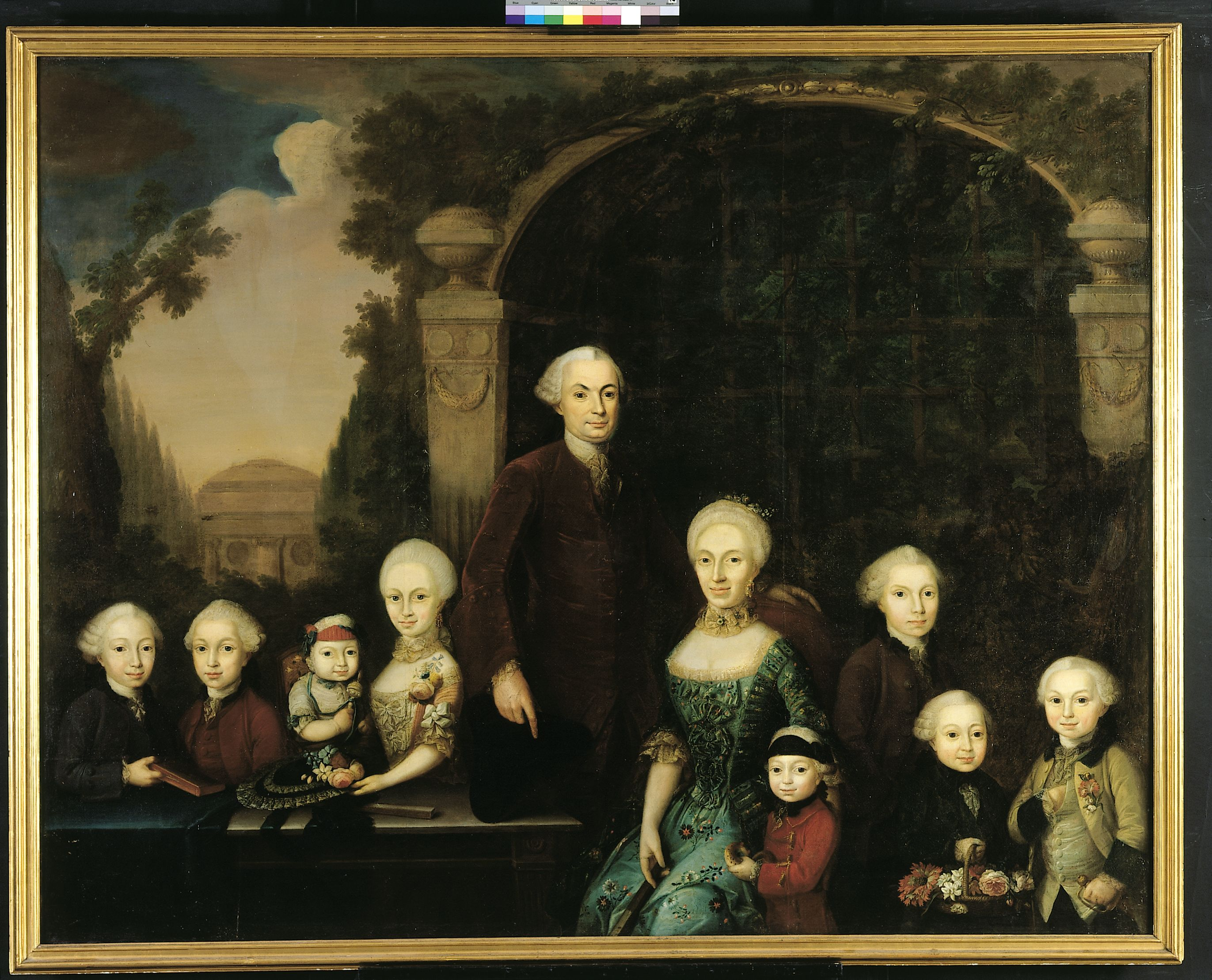
The Family of Peter Fenger, c. 1770, National Museum of Denmark.

Ulrich Ferdinand Beenfeldt (25 November 1714 – 19–20 October 1782) was a Danish portrait painter who worked for the Danish royal family as well as aristocracy and Copenhagen's wealthy bourgeoisie.

== Early life ==
Beenfeldt was born in November 1714, though sources vary on the exact date with some stating that he was born on the 17th, while at least one other source prefers the 25th. He was born in Copenhagen to tailor Hans Jacobsen Beenfeldt (died 1754) and Birgithe Malene Jensdatter Engelman (died 1721). Nothing is known about his early life and education.

== Career ==
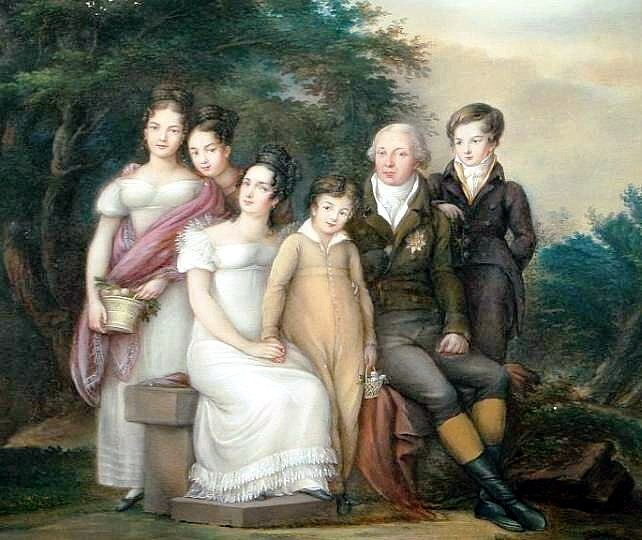
The Family of Volrad August von der Lühe (1773).

The earliest known work by Beenfeld is a copy from 1743 of an earlier portrait of Christine Fuiren Harboe (Støvringgård). In 1747, he painted a portrait of C. P. Flensborg. His earliest known portrait for the royal court is a portrait of Princess Louise from 1749. Other commissions came from some of the leading aristocratic families of the time, including the Reventlow, Laurvigen, Frijs and Holstein families. For several years, he worked for the latter at Ledreborg, creating new portraits as well as copies and consercation of older works.

== Personal life and legacy ==
In November 1744, Beenfeldt married Anna Catharina Elisabeth Göbel (1714–1761). She was a daughter of dyer Johan Georg Göbel (died 1752) and Cathrine Maria Schulz. After his wife's death on 1 December 1761, he married secondly on 6 November 1762 to Lovise Sophie Jantzen (1738–1811). She was a daughter of councilman postmaster in Nyborg, Abraham Jantzen (1697–1759), and Anna Suzanne Rosbeck (1701–1753).

== List of works ==
- Christian Peter Flensborg, Støvringgård (1747)
- Countess Hedevig Holstein, née Vind, Brahetrolleborg (1753,
- Frederik Ludvig Danneskiold-Laurvig, Frederiksborg Castle (probably a copy after portrait by Jean-Marc Nattier 1753)
- Johan Ludvig Holstein, Ledreborg (1754)
- Johan Ludvig Holstein, Ledreborg (1756)
- Hedevig Golstein, née Vind, Ledreborg (1756)
- Peder Rosenstand-Goiske (1760)
- Prinsesse Sophia Magdalena of Denmark, Vemmetofte (1761)
- Simon Crüger, Ledreborg and Copenhagen University (1761)
- Johan Ludvig Holstein, Ledreborg (1762)
- Countess Charlotte Amalie Reventlow, née Holstein, Brahetrolleborg (1762)
- Christian Conrad Danneskiold-Laurvig, Ledreborg (1763, copy after Carl Gustaf Pilo)
- Eggert Christoffer von Linstow, Vemmetofte (1763)
- Conrad Reventlow,Brahetrolleborg (1766)
- Christian Ditlev Reventlow, Brahetrolleborg (1767)
- Grevinde Reventlow,Brahetrolleborg (1767)
- Grevinde Charlotte Amalie Reventlow, født Holstein (1767, Brahetrolleborg)
- Henrik Adam Brockenhuus, Frederiksborg Castle (1767)
- Christian Ditlev Frederik Reventlow, Pederstrup (1767)
- Grosserer The Family of Peter Fenger, National Museum of Denmark (1769)
- Johan Gottlieb Putscher, Danish Museum of Medicine (1770)
- Volrad August von der Lühe, Frederiksborg Castle (1773)
- Marie Christine Schiønning, née Nagler, Frederiksborg Castle (1773)
- Self-portrait of Veenfeldt (1775)
- Ambrosius Charisius, Gammel Estrup (unknown date)
- Louise Sophie Beenfeldt, née Jantzen
- Ulrica Louise Sprechler Beenfeldt (daughter)
- Andreas Hartvig Godiche, Frederiksborg Castle (1776)
- Anna Magdalena Godiche, Frederiksborg Castle (1776)
- Mrs.von der Lühe, Frederiksborg Castle (1777)
- Georg Nielsen, Frederiksborg Castle (1779)
- Informator Ferdinand Klagenberg (1780, Frederiksborgmuseet)
- Hans Müller (1780)

== Gallery ==
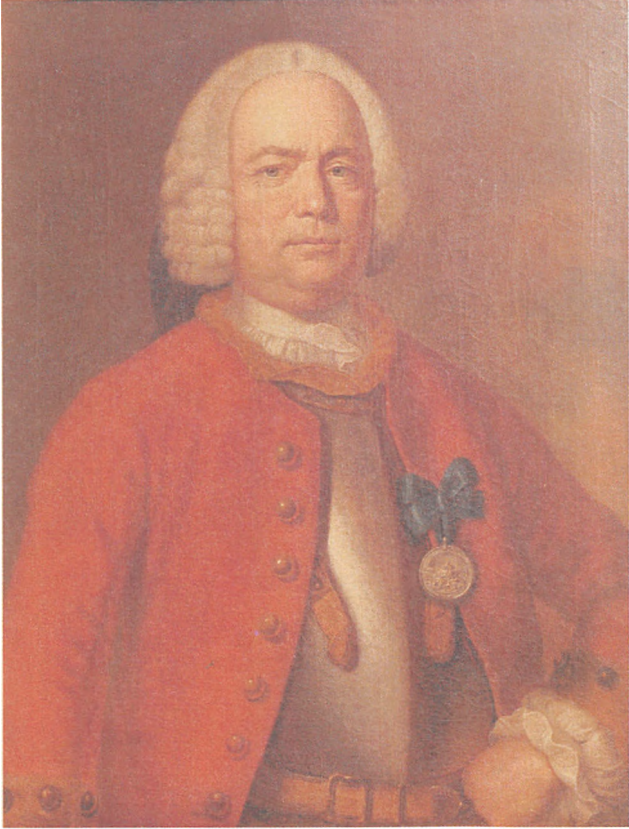
Christian Peter Flensborg (date unknown).

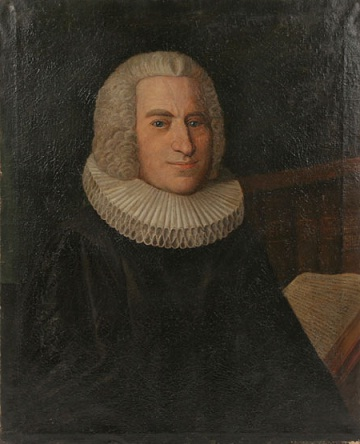
Peder Rosenstand-Goiske (1760).

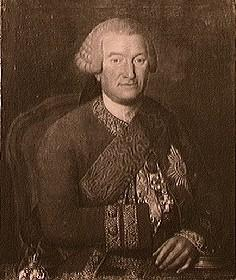
Volrad August von der Lühe (1773).

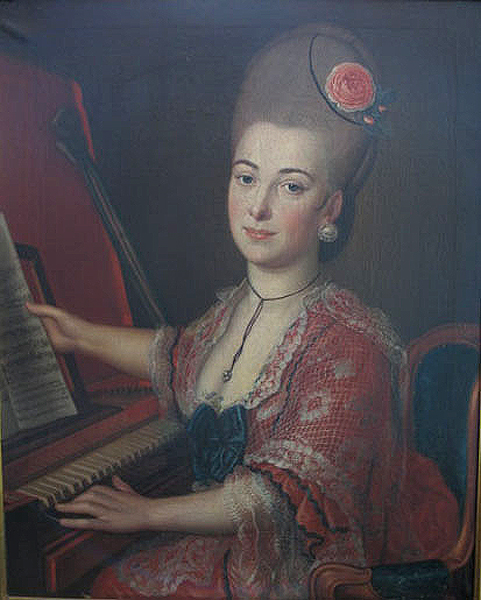
Marie Christine Schiønning, née von Nägler (1775).

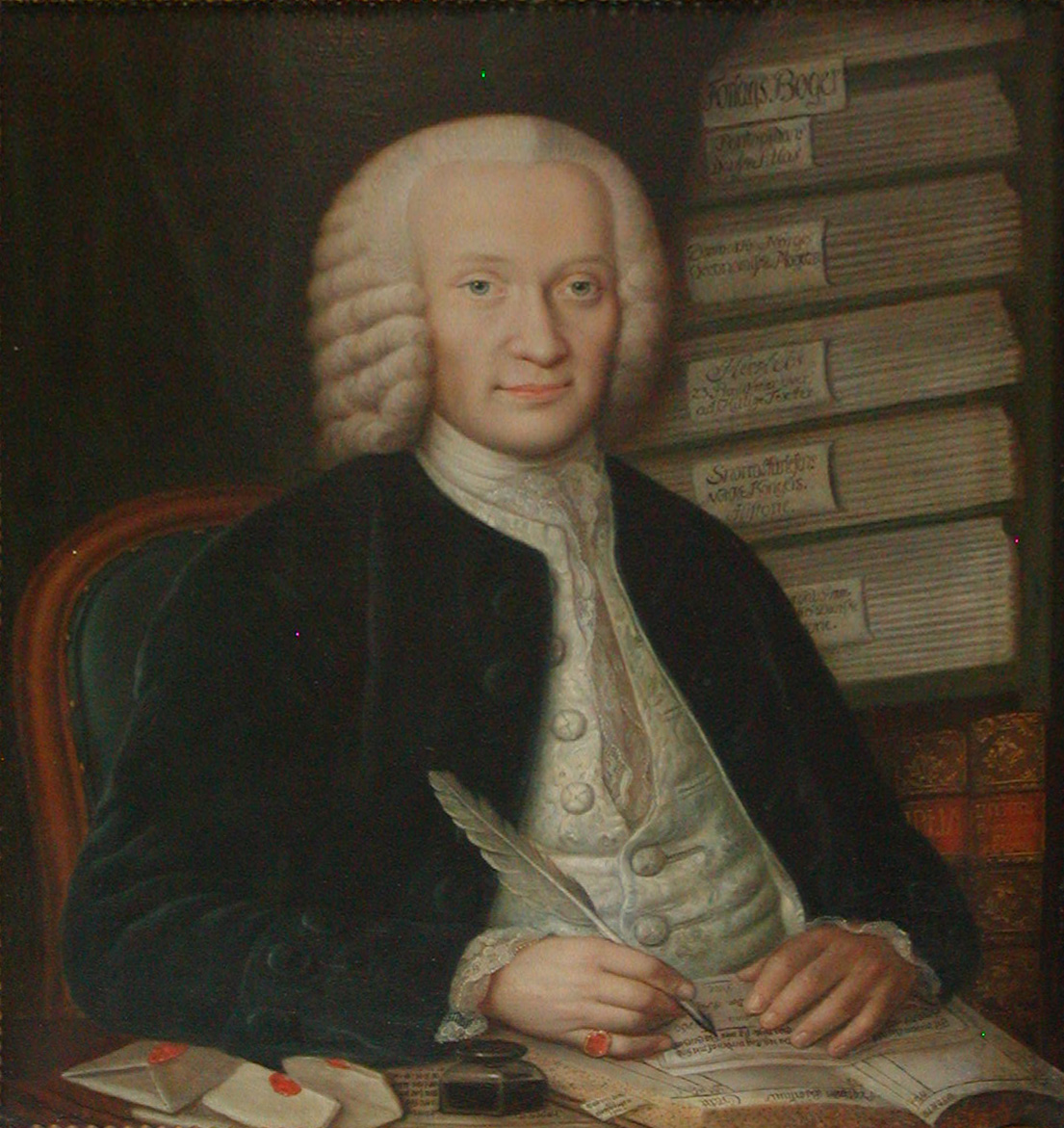
Andreas Hartvig Godiche (1776).

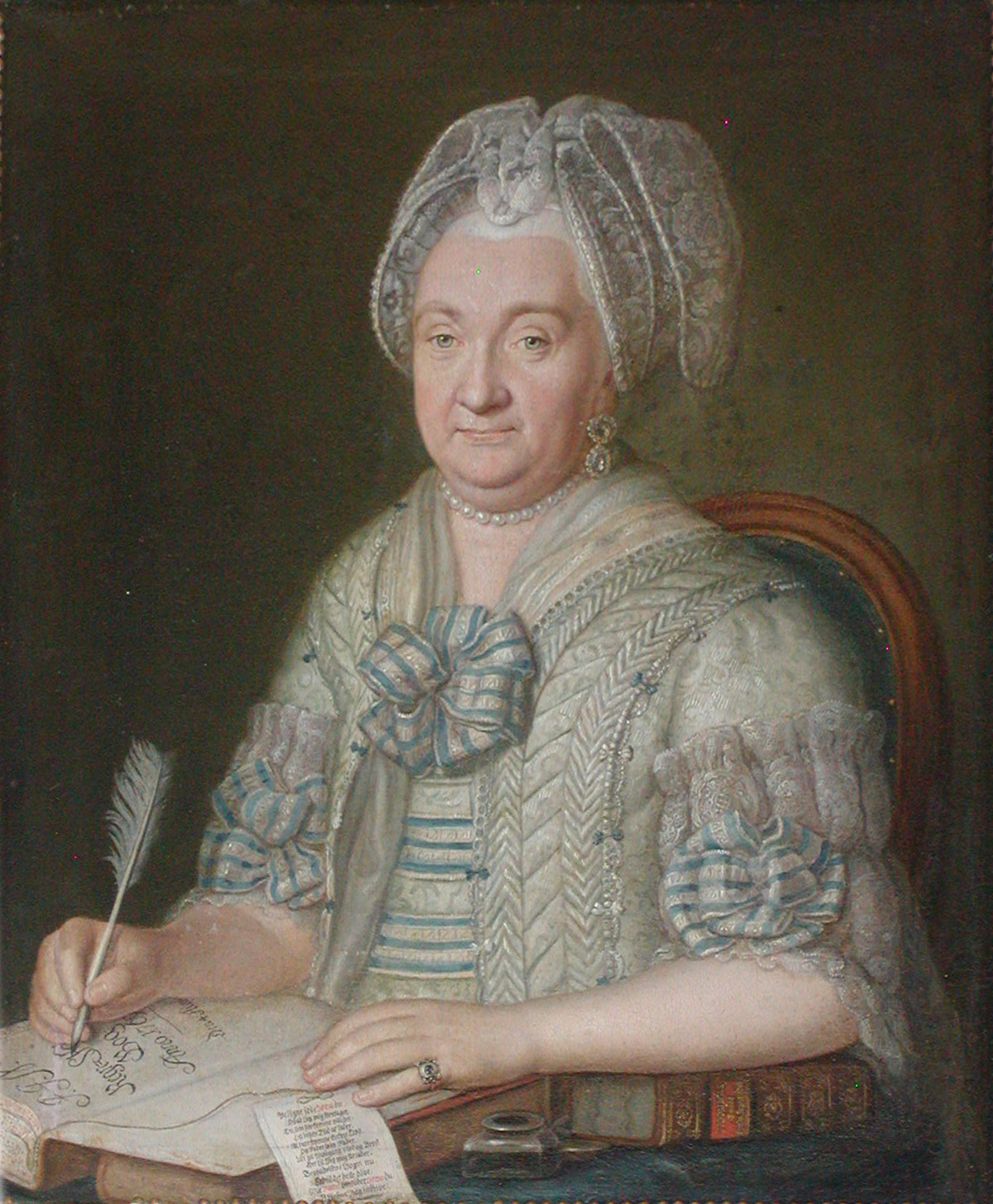
Anna Magdalena Godiche (1776)

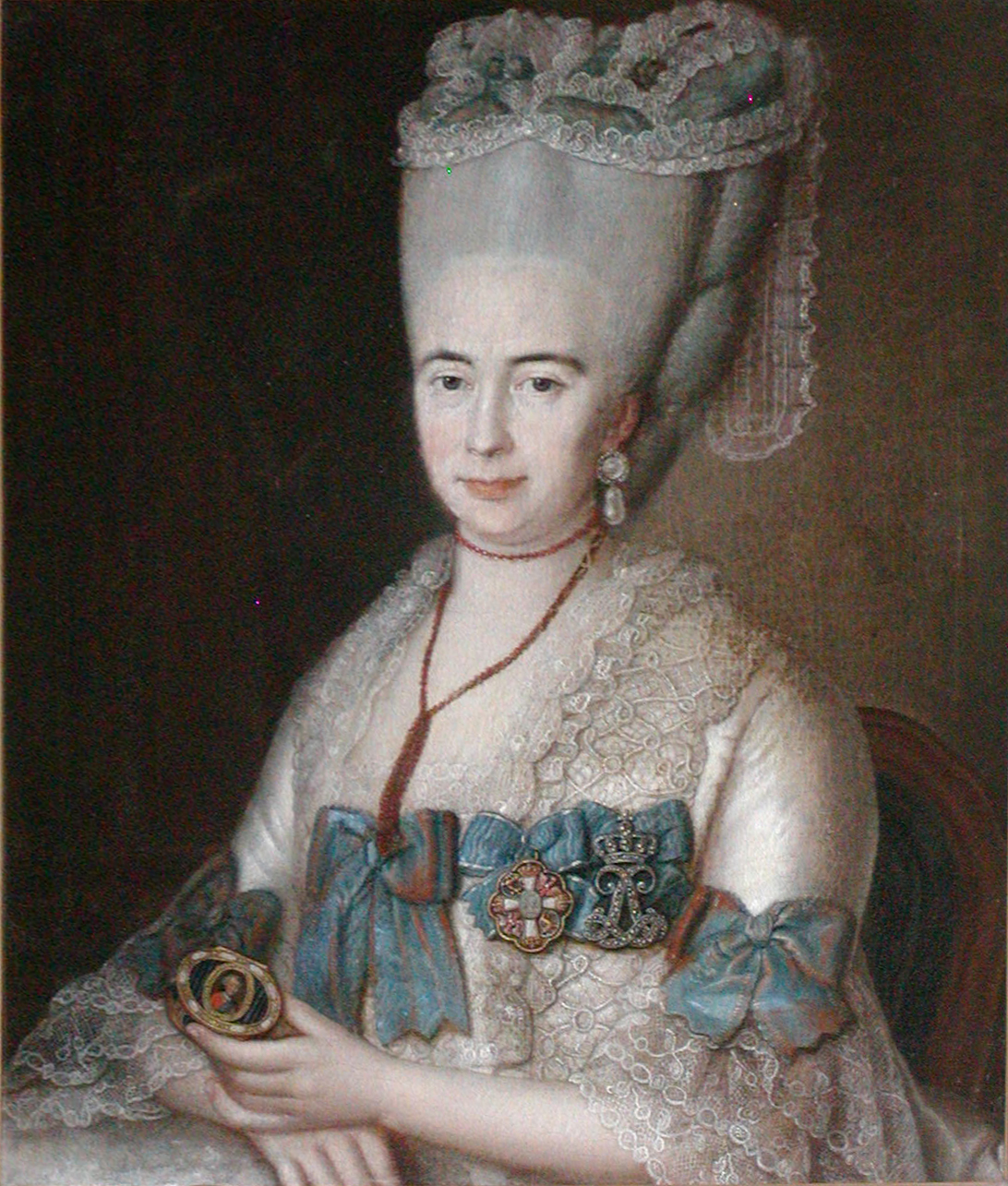
Margrethe von der Lühe, née Holck (1888).

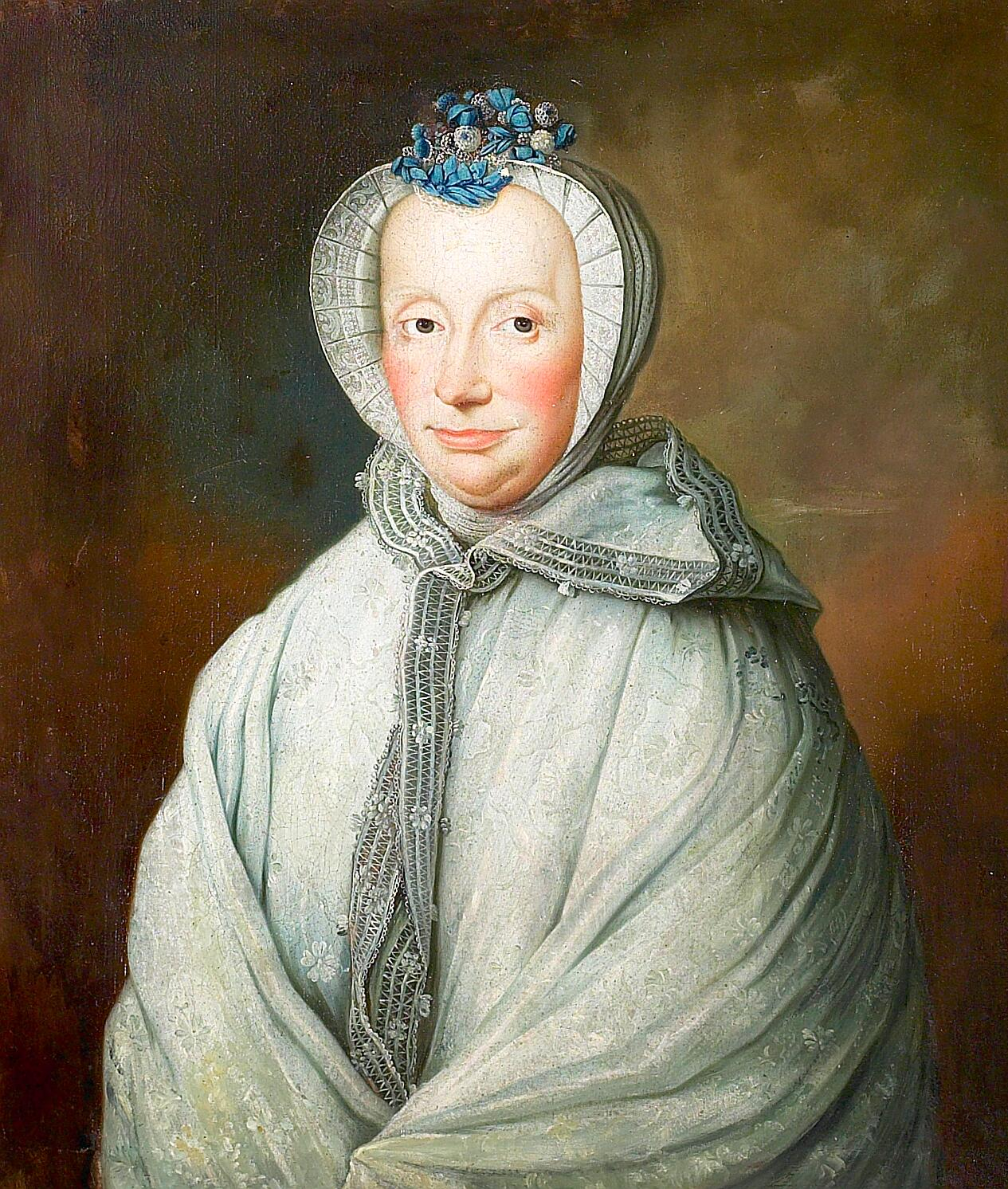
A portrait of a woman with blue and white flowers (date unknown).
