= Hørbygaard =

Historical property near Copehnhagen, Denmark

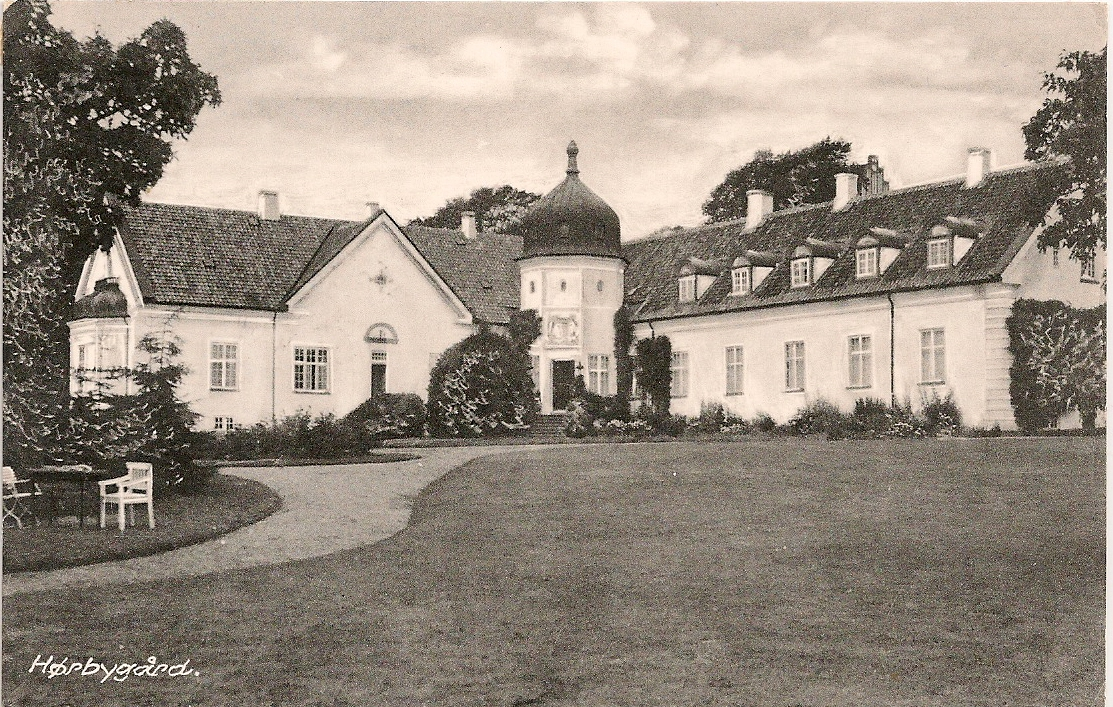
- Interactive map of the Hørbygaard area

General information
- Location: Tuse Næs Vej 7; 4300 Holbæk, Denmark
- Coordinates: 55°44′20.28″N 11°39′58.75″E
- Completed: 1861

Hærbygaard is a manor house and estate located on Tuse Næs, Holbæk Municipality, some 80 kilometres west of Copenhagen, Denmark. The current main building was constructed for Melchior Grevenkop-Castenskiold in 1861-62 and later expanded with a new north wing by Gotfred Tvede in 1900-1901.

== History ==
=== Early history ===
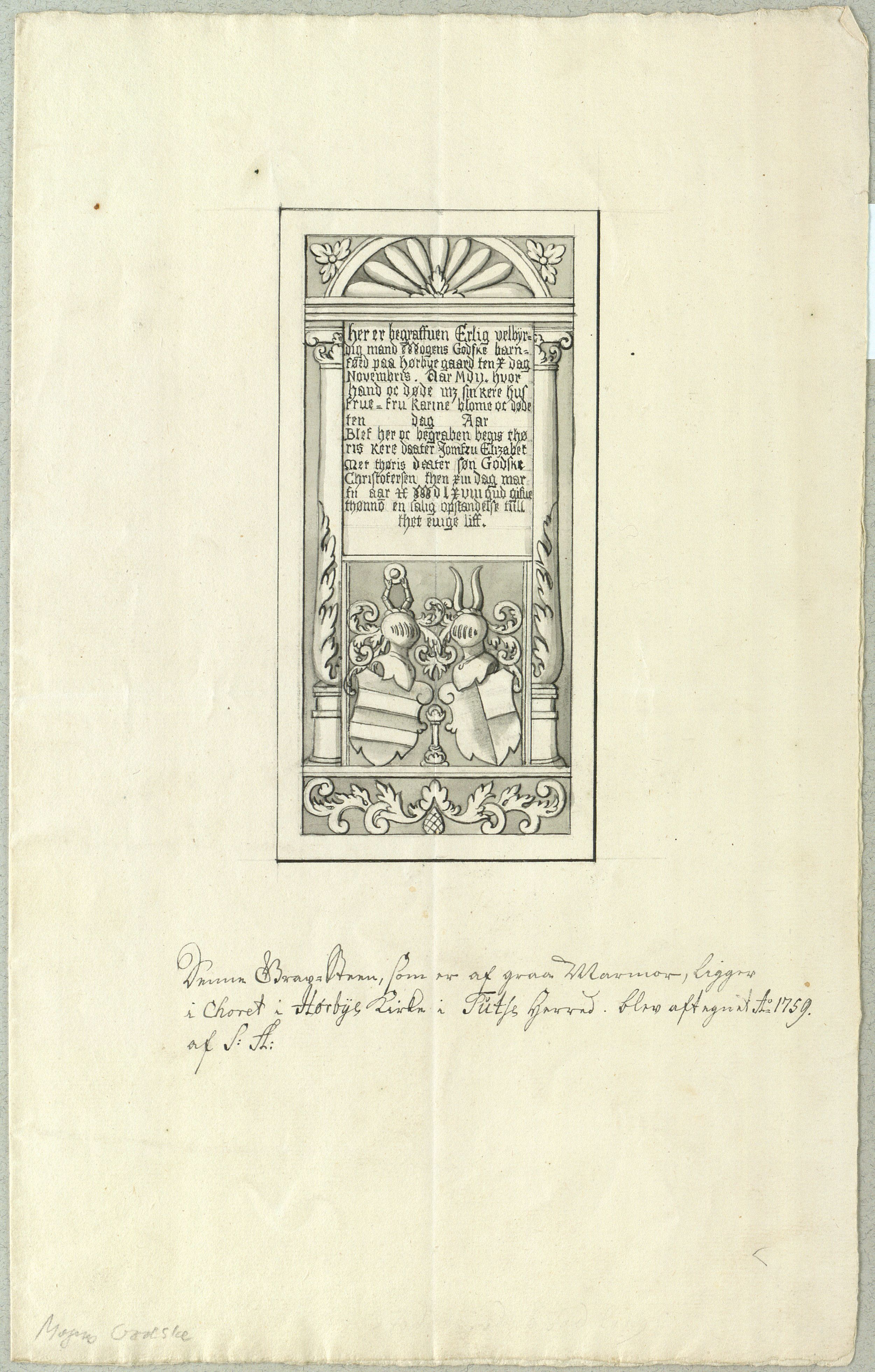
The ledgerstone of Mogens Godske in Hørby Church.

Hørbygaard traces its history back to the 14th century. The first recorded owner of Hørbygaard is Else Tuesen, who in 1314 passed it to her son Niels Tuesen. It was later passed to his sons Peder Nielsen and Karl Nielsen. The latter pawned the estate in 1358.

The estate was then owned by multiple simultaneous owners as was common at the time. In 1411, Bishop Peder Jensen Lodehat acquired a stake in the estate. Not long thereafter, the rest of the estate was also acquired by the Diocese of Roskilde. The estate was subsequently known as Moselen. It was operated as a fief. Mogens Godskesen (Bielke) was one of the Seignories (lensmann). Godskesen was in 1526 granted the estate for life. He and his wife are buried in the adjacent Hørby Church.

=== Crown land ===
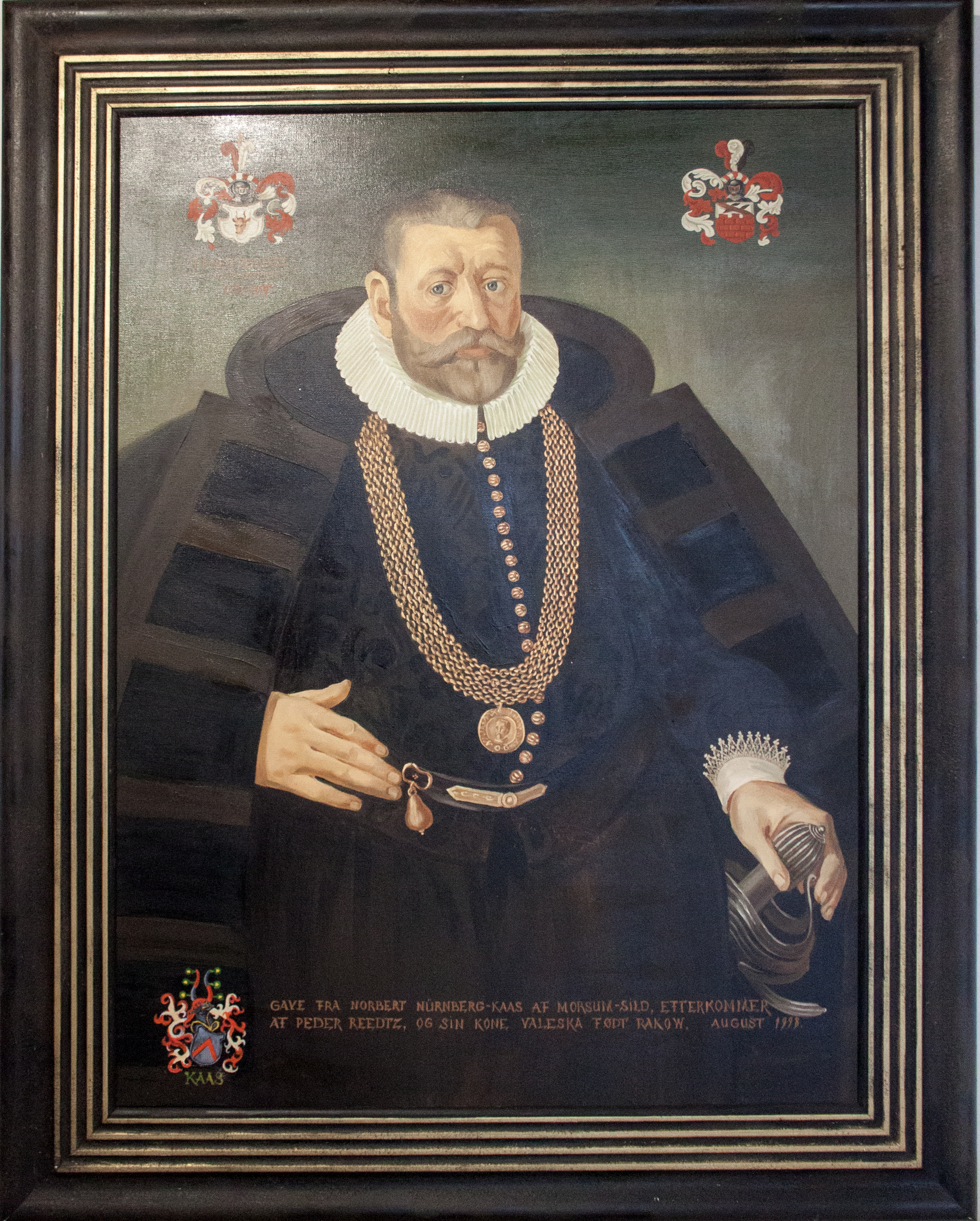
Peder Reedtz

Mogens Godskesen kept the estate as a fief after it was confiscated by the Crown after the Reformation in 1536 and he was also granted Dragsholm.

In 1589, Frederick II granted Hørbygaard to Peder Reedtz and his descendents. He had come to Denmark at the outbreak of the Northern Seven Years' War where he had won the favour of the king. He had also been rewarded with a number of other fiefs: Sorø (until 1584), Antvorskov (until 14589) and Saltø. In 1587–88, he served as kensmand of Jorsør. In 1587, he had acquired nearby Tygestrup from the Crown in exchange for property elsewhere. He expanded Hørby Church with a burial chapel for the family. He was succeeded by his son Frederik Reedtz as lensmand of Hørbygaard. Frederik Reedtz's son, Steen Reedtz, who was deep in debt, breached his obligations as lensmann. This resulted in a lawsuit in which his heirs renounced their right to succeed him at Hørbygaard.

=== Changing owners, 1692–1748 ===
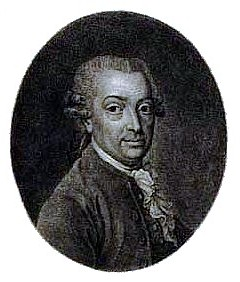
Christen Friis Rottbøll, a medical doctor and botanist, who was born on the estate in 1727

In 1692, Christian V granted the estate to Admiral Henrik Span who was at the same time raised to the peerage. He had been appointed as Head of Nyholm in 1690 where he had reorganized the naval base and modernised the operations at the Royal Danish Naval Dockyards. He settled on the estate and constructed a tower which enabled him to see the sea from the house.

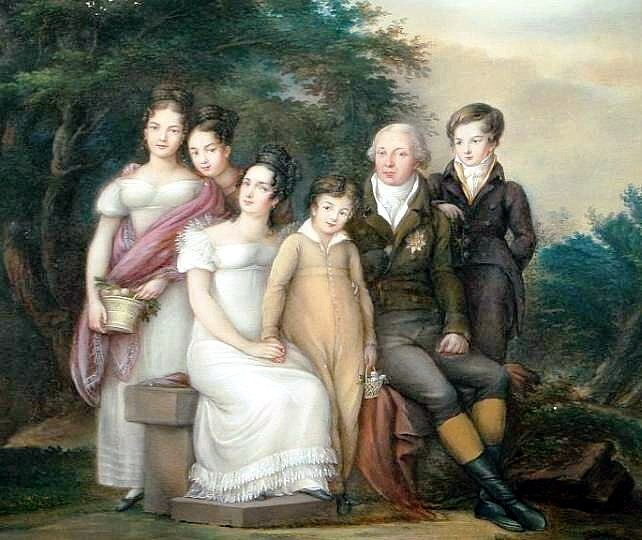
Volrad August von der Lühe with his family

Span's widow kept the estate after his death just two years later. Their daughter and only child, Charlotte Amalie Henriksdatter Span, inherited it in 1722. The medical doctor and botanist Christen Friis Rottbøll and the bishop Christian Michael Rottbøll were born on the estate in 1727 and 1820. Their father, Christen Michelsen Rottbøll, was manager of the estate. He died in 1820 and their mother later married the manager of nearby Hagestedgaard. Charlotte Amalie Henriksdatter Span had no children and returned the estate to the Crown in 1730.

In 1744, Hørbygaard was granted to Volrad August von der Lühe. In 1743, he had been appointed overkammerjunker. He would later serve as Lord President in Copenhagen.

=== The Castenskiold family ===
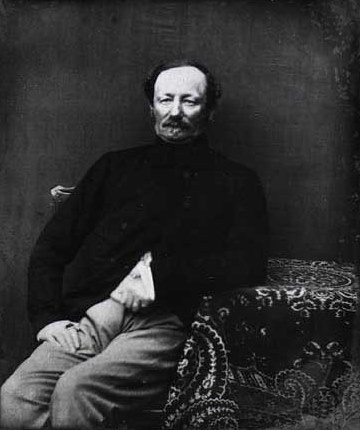
Jørgen Frederik Castenskiold.

Jacoba von Holten, the widow of Johan Lorentz Castenschiold, acquired the estate in 1748. She ceded the estate to their second eldest son Jørgen Frederik von Castenschiold in 1760. He later also acquired Valbygård (1776-1803) and Store Frederikslund in Lille Frederikslund 1787. He implemented many of the agricultural reforms of the time.

Jørgen Frederik von Castenschiold's son Casper inherited the estate in 1813. He adopted the name Grevencop-Castenschiold in 1826.

His son Joachim Melchior Grevenkop-Castenschiold, who had inherited the estate in 1854, constructed a new main building in around 1861. The last copyholds were converted into freeholds in around 1900. The building was in the 20th century from 1935 for a while owned by a family trust and used as a summer camp for children from Copenhagen and a home for working class widows.

== Today ==
The current owner is Christian Castenskiold. The estate covers 435 hectares of land.

== List of owners ==
- ( -1314) Else Tuesen
- (1314-1339) Niels Tuesen
- (1333- ) Peder Nielsen
- (1344-1358) Karl Nielsen
- (1358-1411) Changing owners
- (1411-1536) Roskilde Bispestol
- (1536-1693) The Crown
- (1693-1694) Henrik Span
- (1694-1722) Susanne Christine Schønback, gift Span
- (1722-1730) Henriette Henriksdatter Span, gift von Pagelsen
- (1730-1744) Kronen
- (1744-1748) Volrad August von der Lühe
- (1748-1760) Jacoba von Holten, gift Castenschiold
- (1760-1813) Jørgen Frederik von Castenschiold
- (1813-1854) Casper Holten Grevencop-Castenschiold
- (1854-1878) Joachim Melchior Grevenkop-Castenschiold
- (1878-1890) Thekla Mathilde Hochschild, gift Grevenkop-Castenskiold
- (1890-1913) Carl Holten Grevenkop-Castenskiold
- (1913-1925) Enke efter Carl Holten Grevenkop-Castenskiold
- (1925-1935) Louise Grevenkop-Castenskiold
- (1935- ) Familien Grevenkop-Castenskiold Stift
- ( -1985) Claus Christian Castenskiold
- (1985- ) Christian Gustav Castenskiold
