= Kongsdal =

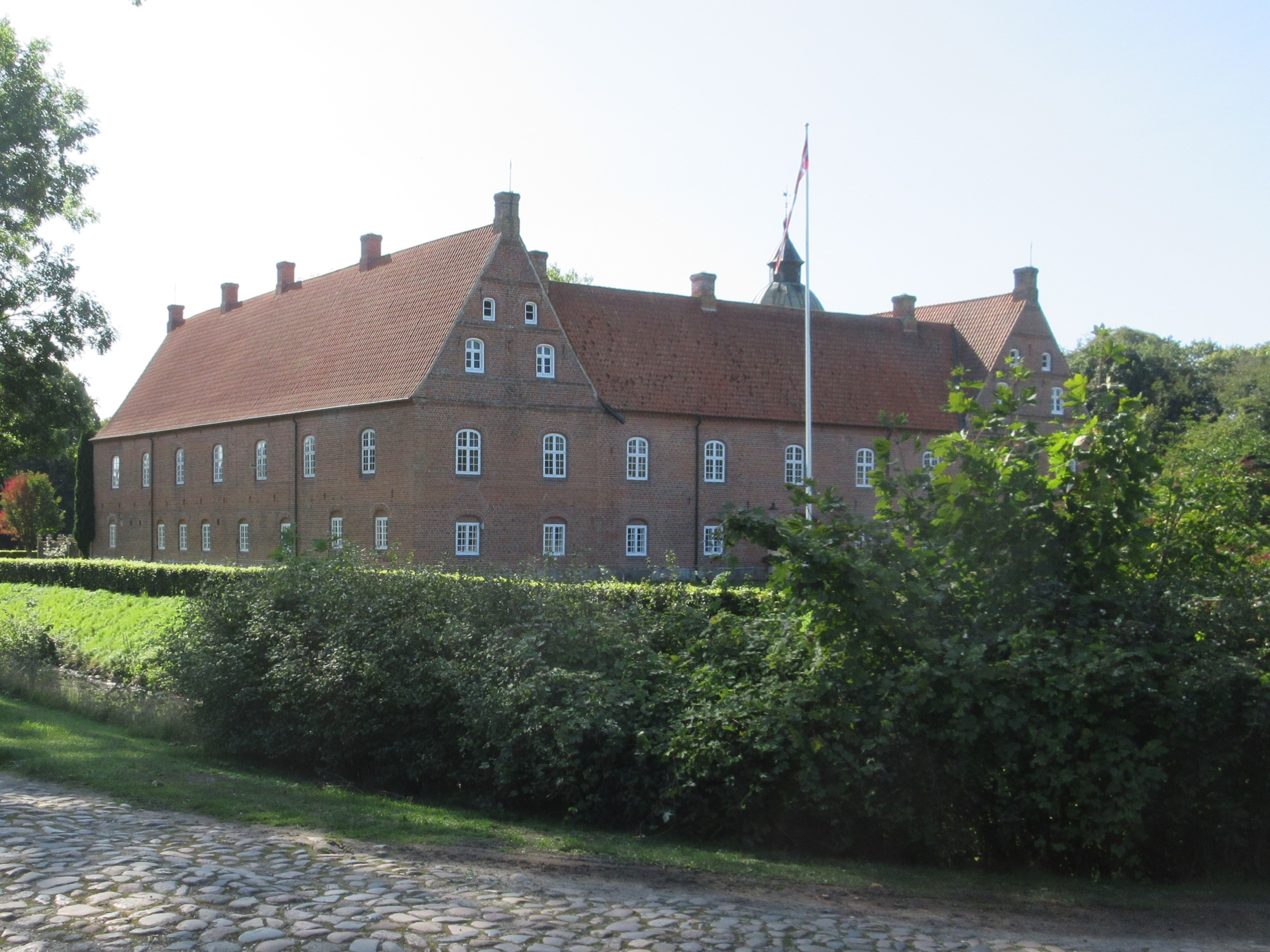
- Kongsdal in September 2020
- Former names: Tygestrup

General information
- Type: Manor Estate
- Location: Kongsdal, Undløse parish, Holbæk Municipality, Region Zealand,, Denmark
- Coordinates: 55.6174°N 11.5513°E
- Current tenants: Hans Iakob Estrup
- Construction started: 1180
- Completed: 1710
- Renovated: 1990-
- Owner: Estrup Family
- Landlord: Hans Iakob Estrup

References
- Geographical names

Kongsdal (1280–1661: Tygestrup) is a manor house and estate located approximately 14 kilometres (8.7 mi) southwest of Holbaek, between Undløse and Mørkøv, Holbæk Municipality, some 60 km west of Copenhagen, Denmark. The three-winged main building from the 1590s was listed in the Danish registry of protected buildings and places in 1918.

== History ==
=== Hvide family ===
The estate traces its history back to the late 12th century when Sorø Abbey established a home farm (ladegård) named Undløse at the site. The land had been presented to it by Bishop Absalon in 1180. It was later expanded with more tenant farms until it comprised most of the parish and much of the surrounding villages.

In 1205, Sorø Abbey returned Undløse to the Hvide family in exchange for Pedersborg on Lolland. Undløse was subsequently in the hands of members of the Hvide family for many generations. The most prominent member of the family to own the estate was Marsk Stig Andersen. In 1280, he renamed the estate Rtgestrup. He was later convicted of the murder of Erik Klipping in 1286. All his holdings were confiscated, but a settlement in 1309 returned Tygestrup to his son Anders Stigsøn. This son, Stig Andersen, was later part of an unsuccessful rebellion against Valdemar IV. In 1361, he was forced to present Tygestrup to Antvorskov Abbey.

After the Reformation, in 1536, Tygestrup was confiscated by the Crown. It was subsequently managed as a royal fief.

=== Reedtz family ===
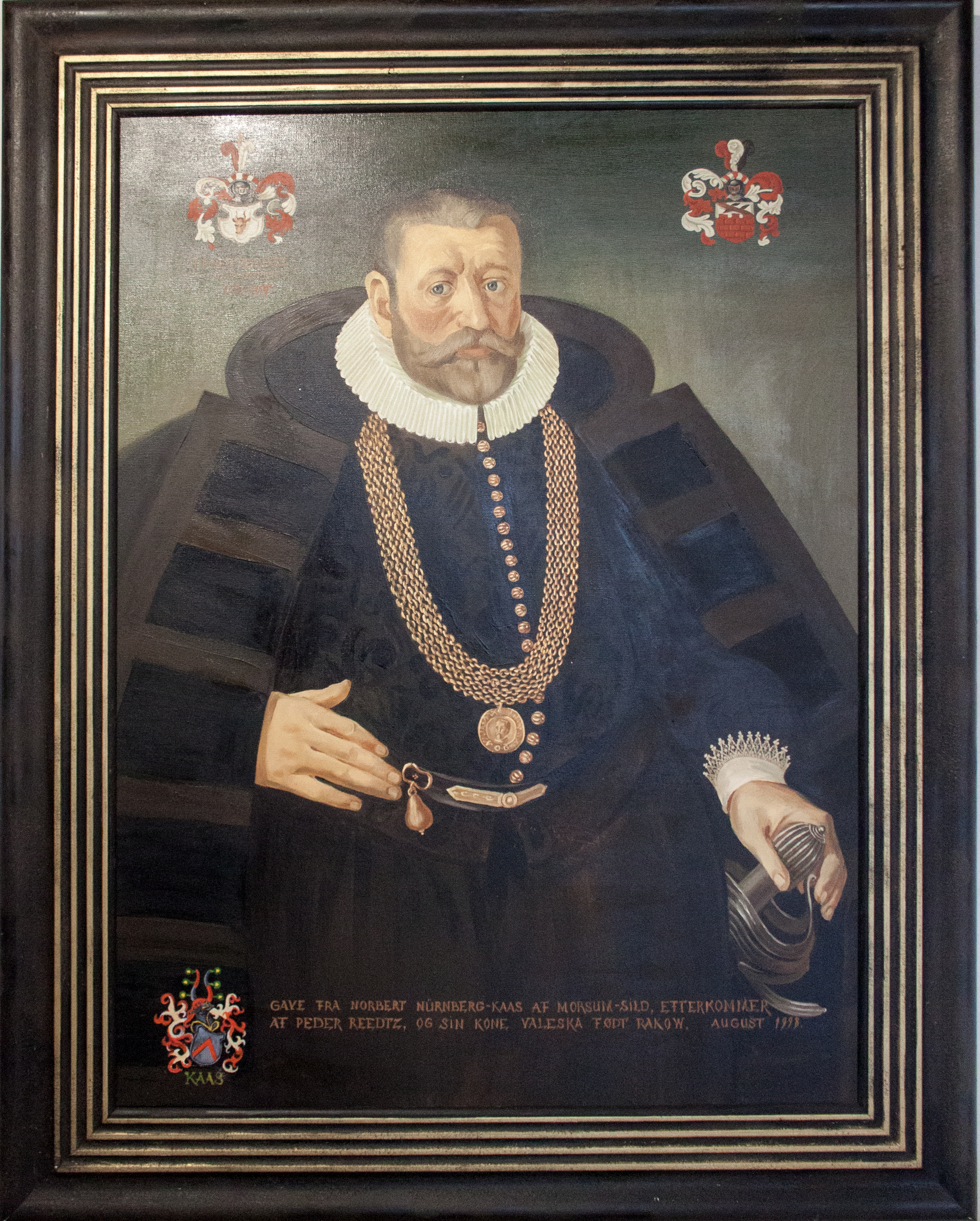
Peder Reedtz

In 1587, Frederick II ceded Tygestrup to Peder Reedtz in exchange for land elsewhere. Reedtz had come to Denmark at the outbreak of the Northern Seven Years' War, where he had won the favour of the king. He had for a while served as avener and was later rewarded with a number of royal fiefs on Zealand: Peder Reedtz increased the size of the estate through a number of barters with the king. On his death in 1667, it passed to his son Frederik Reedtz. He was, partly as a result of his two marriages, also able to expand the estate. He was a member of the Privy Council and ''lensmand of Vordingborg Castle. His son, Peder Reedtz, who inherited the estate in 1659, spent most of his time at the royal court in Copenhagen. In 1667, he was appointed as Chancellor to Frederick III. Tygestrup was by then a very large estate.

=== 1669- 1835: Changing owners ===
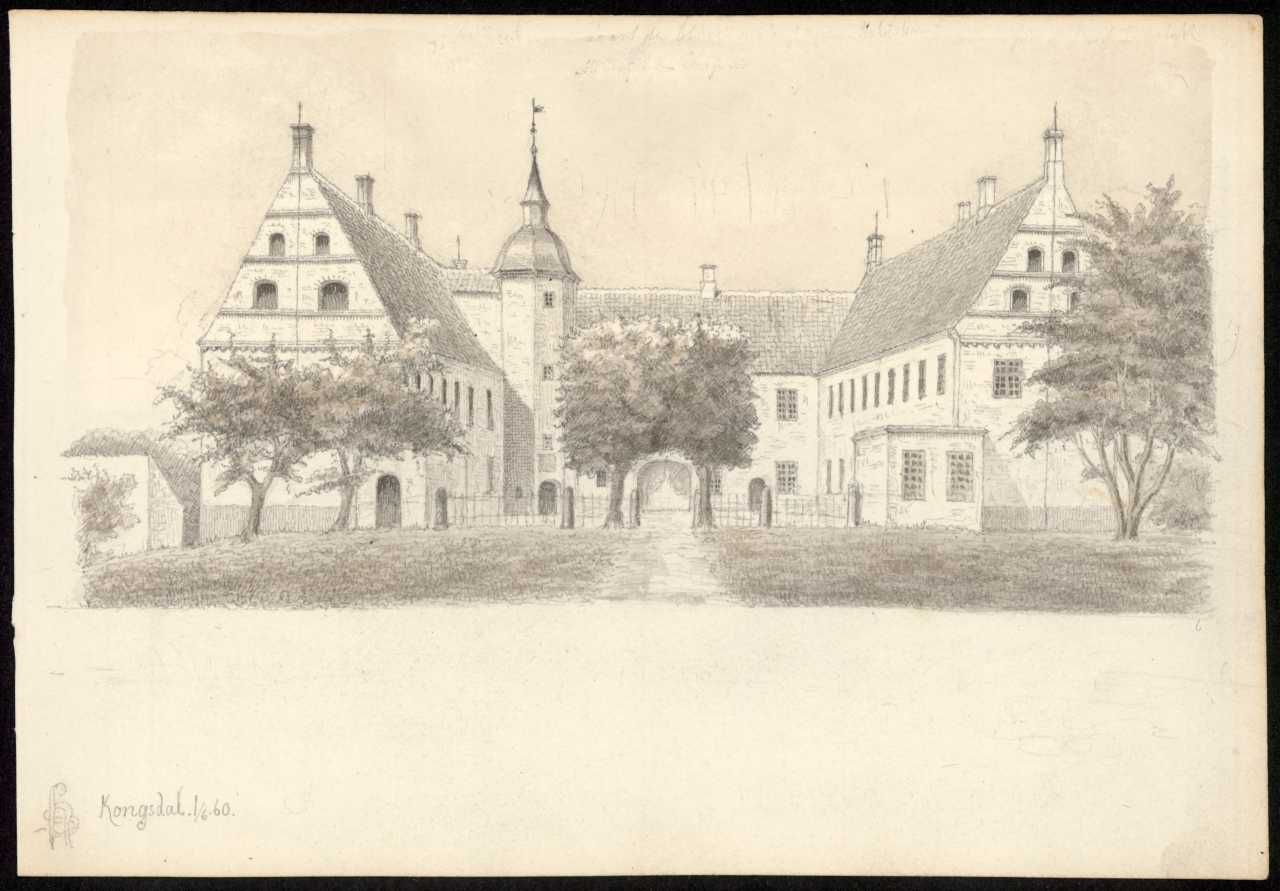
Kongsdal, 1860

In 1669, Redtz ceded the estate to Frederick III in exchange for Børgyum Abbey. Frederick III renamed the estate Kongsdal. After Frederick III's death, Kongsdal passed to his son George, Prince of Denmark, who shortly thereafter ceded it to Christoffer Parsberg in exchange for Jungshoved. Parsberg and his wife Birgitte Skeel had no children. On his death in 1672, Kongsdal was therefore passed to his brother-in-law Otte Pogwisch. Pogwisch ended up deep in debt and had to sell some of the land. The rest of the estate was, after his death, sold in public auction to Valdemar Gabel. Up through the 18th century, Kongsdal changed hands many times. In 1718, it was acquired by General Gregers Juel. In 1731, he sold the estate to colonel Johan von Schack. He added more land through the acquisition of a number of new tenant farms.

In 1773, Kongsdal was acquired by Lorents Lassen. His son, Niels Lassen, continued his father's work but was hit by the difficult times. In 1812, he had to sell the estate.

=== 1835–present: Estrup family ===
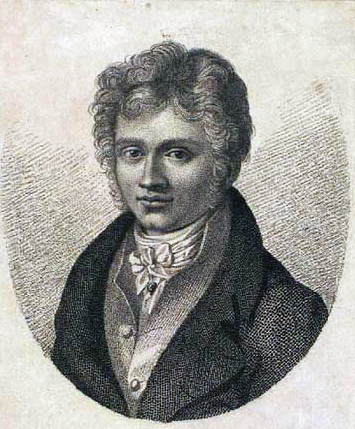
Hector Frederik Janson Estrup

In 1835, Kongsdal was sold for 130,000 Danish rigsdaler to Hector Frederik Janson Estrup, the director of Sorø Academy, who had just married Anna Christine Scavenius. She was the daughter of a wealthy landowner and the sister of his first wife. It was his two marriages that had enabled him to buy the estate. He resigned in 1837 to concentrate on managing his estate. Hector Estrup established a number of libraries and schools on the estate. He also wrote a book about its history. On his death, Kongsdal was passed to his son, Jacob Brønnum Scavenius Estrup. He preferred Skaføgård in Jutland as his primary country residence, and Kongsdal was instead used as a dower house for his mother. In 1874–1894, he served as Prime Minister of Denmark. Estrup died at Kongsdal in 1913. It belonged to his son at that time.

== Estate ==
Kongsdal farmhouse is located in the Holbæk Municipality of Region Zealand. The farm is forested, and the forest type in the estate is of Cold-deciduous Forest. The Vegetation Zone belongs to the Cool Temperate Moist Forest of the Holdridge Bioclimatic Zone.

Soil type of Cambisols (CM) in the estate area is of moderate soils. At shallow depths, the soil indicates color or structure changes different from the parent soils.

== Owners ==
- (before 1180) Absalon
- (1180-1280) Sorø Abbey
- (1280-1309) Stig Andersen Hvide
- (1309-1315) Anders Stigsen Hvide
- (1315-1361) Stig Andersen Hvide
- (1361-1536) Antvorskov Kloster
- (1536-1587) Kronen
- (1587-1607) Peder Reedtz
- (1607-1609) Karen Reedtz (née Rostrup)
- (1609-1655) Frederik Reedtz
- (1655-1669) Peder Frederiksen Reedtz
- (1669-1670) Frederik III
- (1670-1671) Christian V of Denmark
- (1671-1672) Christoffer Parsberg
- (1672-1681) Otto Pogwisch
- (1681-1698) Valdemar Christopher Gabel
- (1698-1703) Caspar von Bartholin
- (1703-1714) Lars Andersen
- (1714-1725) Gregers Juel
- (1725-1731) Jacob Hjort
- (1731-1748) Johan von Schack
- (1748-1750) Adolph Heinrich von Staffeldt
- (1750-1751) Anne Cathrine von der Maase née (1) von Staffeldt (2) von Hauch
- (1751-1756) Andreas von Hauch
- (1756-1769) Christian Albrecht von Massow von der Osten
- (1769-1794) Lorenz Lassen
- (1794-1812) Niels Lassen
- (1812-1814) Edvard Gram / Peder Bech
- (1814-1815) Edvard Gram
- (1815-1835) Jacob Benzon Resch
- (1835-1846) Hector Frederik Janson Estrup
- (1846-1907) Jacob Brønnum Scavenius Estrup
- (1907-1914) Hector Estrup
- (1914-1941) Mathilde Juel née Estrup
- (1941-1963) Iakob Estrup
- (1963-1990) Iakob Estrup
- (1990-) Hans Iakob Estrup
