= Enevold Parsberg =

Enevold Parsberg (c. 1630 – 4 December 1689) was a Danish nobleman who served as privy councillor, Supreme Court justice and county governor of Abrahamstrup and Aalborg.

== Early life and education ==
Parsberg was born in c. 1630 to privy councillor Oluf Parsberg (1590–1661) and Karen Kruse (1600–1661). He was the elder brother of Christoffer Parsberg. He was educated at Sorø Academy and abroad from 1648 to 1653.

== Career ==
In 1648, Parsberg was appointed court page (hofjunker). During the Swedish Wars, in 1658–60, he served as colonel-lieutenant in the cavalry. After the war, he returned to court service for Prince George and his sisters. After Princess Anna Sophie's wedding to Prince Elector Johann Georg of Saxony in Copenhagen in October 1661, he was one of the men who escorted the couple on their trip to Saxony.

In 1665–72, he served as county governor of Abrahamstrup. He seems to have stayed in Copenhagen, leaving the management of the county to a manager. In February 1669, he was made a privy councillor (gehejmeråd), Supreme Court justice and assessor in Statskollegiet. In Statskollegiet, he supported freedom of religion for immigrants. In 1671, he was appointed county governor and stiftsbefalingsmand of Aalborg. In April 1676, he was made a member of the commission tasked with investigating Peder Griffenfeld's appointments for government offices since 1670. After a failed attempt to be appointed hofmester for the queen, in May, he was sent back to Aalborg. He owned Pallesbjerg, an estate in Ulfborg.

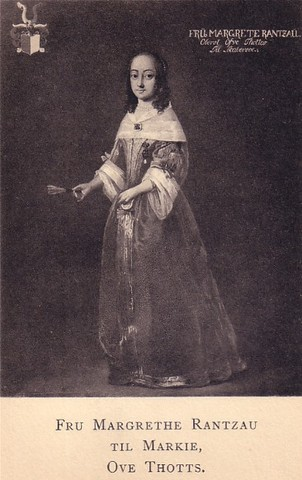
Margarete Parsberg, née von Rantzau

== Personal life ==
On 21 April 1661, Parsberg married Lene Trolle (1643–1662). She was the daughter of privy councillor Niels Trudholm (1599–1667) and Helle Rosenkrantz (1618–85). After the death of his first wife, just 15 months after their wedding, he married secondly to Margrethe Rantzau (c. 1633–1698). She was a daughter of Frederik Rantzau til Krapperup, Asdal og Bollerup (1590–1645) and Ide Ottesdatter Skeel (c. 1610–1684).
