= Marie Martine Bonfils =

Danish businessperson

Marie Martine Bonfils (1731-1804) was a Danish businessperson.

She was married to Ditlev Carl Philibert Bonfils (1718–1773) from Alsace, who had a successful brewery and vine trade in Copenhagen, delivering to the Danish royal company. She took over the businesses when she became a widow. The company belonged to the biggest in Denmark, and she was one of the most notable businesswomen in Denmark, alongside Anna Magdalena Godiche, Johanne Wadum Black Erichsen and Elisabeth Christine Berling.

Her brewery was situated at Springgade No. 18 in Rosenborg Quarter (now part of Pilestræde 63, demolished).
