= Frederik Reedtz =

Danish privy councillor and landowner

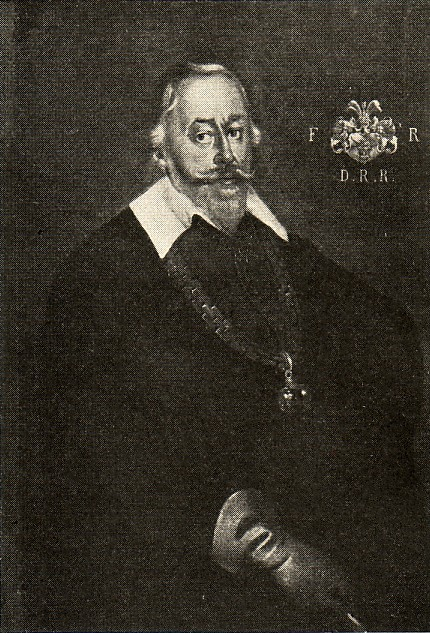
Frederik Reedtz.

Frederik Reedtz (1586 – 8 June 1659) was a Danish privy councillor and major landowner.

== Early life and education ==
Reedtz was born in 1586 at Antvorskov, the son of Peder Reedtz til Tygestrup (1531–1607) and Karen Rostrup (died 1636). He studied in Wittenberg (1600), Geneve (1602), Basel (1603) and Orleans (1603).

== Career ==
In 1605–08, he was a court page (hofjunker). During the Kalmar War, in August 1611, he took part in the conquest of Öland.

In 1623, he is mentioned as rittmeister. 1738 saw him appointed as land commissioner. In December 1644, he was made a member of the privy council (rigsrådet).

== Property ==
At his father's death, he inherited Tygestrup. By the crown, he was granted the fiefs Hørbygaard (1607–?), Svenstrup (1619–22), Tryggevælde (1622–32), and Vordingborg (1632 until his death).

In 1638, Reedtz's holdings covered 2,514 tønder hartkorn of which 1,579 tønder hartkorn was located on Zealand and 831 tønder hartkorn was located in Jutland. Prior to his death, he seems to have divided his Zealand estates between his sons Steen and Peder.

== Personal life ==
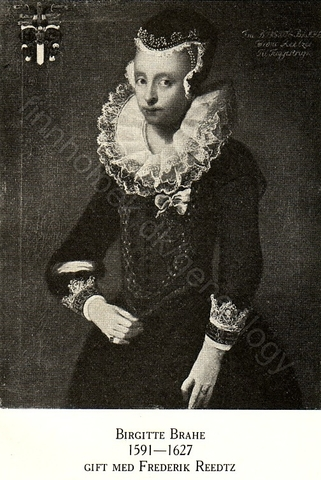
Birgitte Steensdatter Brahe.

On 9 July 1609, Reedtz married Birgitte Brahe (1591–1627). She was the daughter of privy councillor Steen Brahe (1547–1620) and Kirsten Holck (1558–99). They had 10 children, including Peder Reedtz and Jørgen Reedtz.

On 22 June 1634, he married Sophie Høg (1588–1653). She was the daughter of Stygge Høg (1560–c. 1630) and Anne Ulfstand (died 1627). He was the father of Peder Reedtz (1614–74).
