= Oluf Parsberg =

Danish privy councillor and landowner

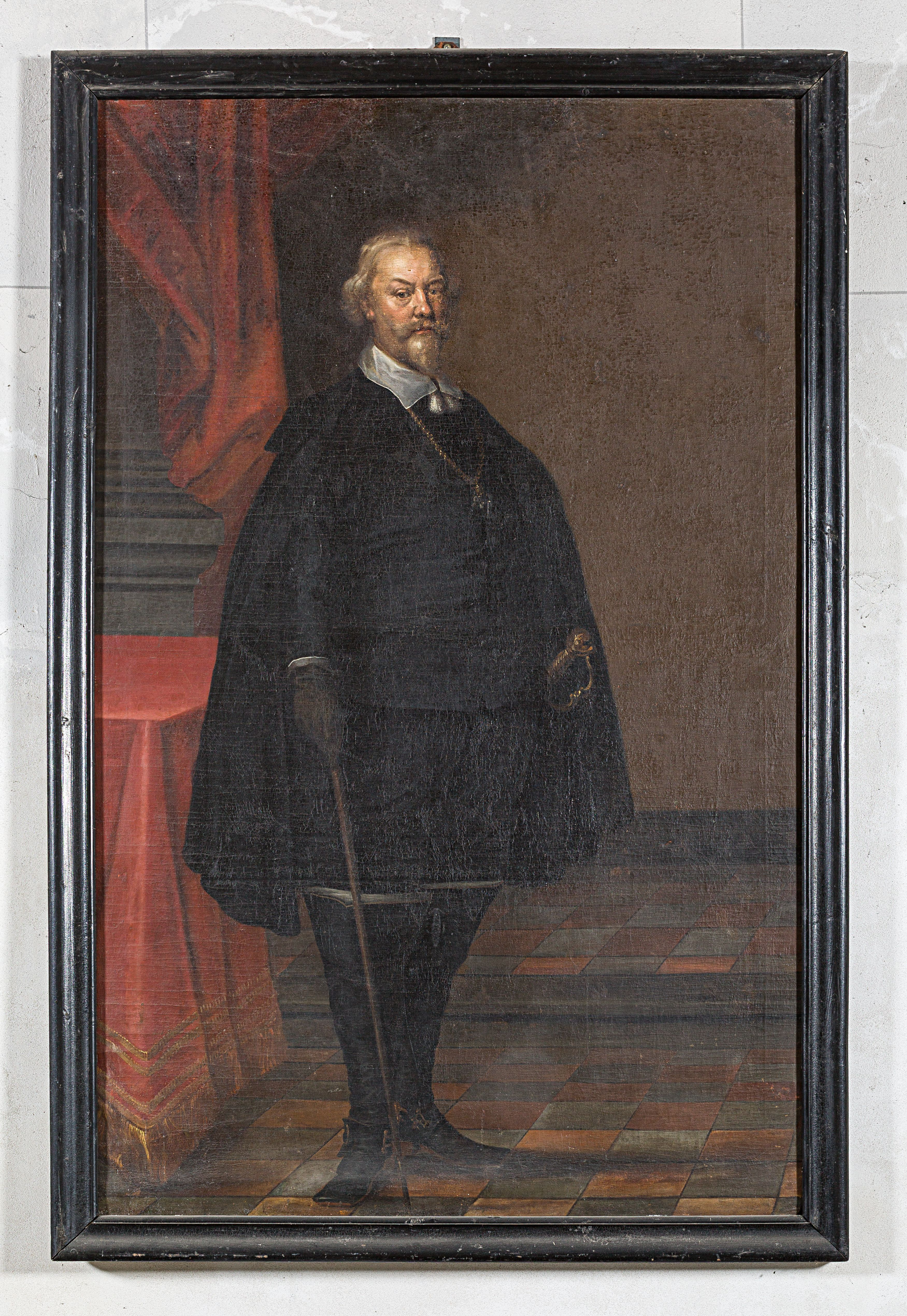
Portrait of Oluf Parsberg at Valdemar's Castle.

Oluf Parsberg (11 June 1590 – 19 July 1661) was a Danish privy councillor and kandholder. He was the father of Christoffer Parsberg.

== Early life and education ==
Parsberg was born on 1 June 1590 at Kalø Castle, the son of Christoffer Parsberg of Hviderup, Jernit and Hagsholm (1555–1600) and Dorte Olufsdatter Munk (Lange) of Sødal (died 1641). He attended Sorø Academy from 1599.

== Career ==
Parsberg entered court service as court page (hofjunker) in 1615. 1618 saw him promoted to jammerjunker. He was subsequently granted a number of royal fiefs in Denmark and Norway. In May 1640, he was admitted to the Privy Council. In October 1643, he was sent on a diplomatic mission to Moscow. The aim of the mission was to have Count Valdemar Christian married to one of Tsar Alexis' daughters. After his return to Copenhagen in August 1645, he was faced with severe criticism for his management of Trondhjem Fief. Governor Hannibal Sehested was very critical of his conduct. He maintained a close relationship with Corfitz Ulfeldt, whose brother Laurids Ulfeldt was married to Parsberg's daughter Else Corfitz. Ulfelt borrowed him 40,000 rigsdaler just before fleeing to Sweden. In private letters to Ulfeldt, he was very critical of the new leadership. Parsberg's position at the royal court was not significantly affected by Ulfeldt's fall from power. In a 1653 document addressed to his two sons, with guidelines of conduct, he encouraged them to always ingratiate themselves with people of power and influence through flattery. In August 1659, Parsberg took part in the peace negotiations with Sweden alongside Mogens Høg. In March 1549, now together with Axel Urup and Peder Reedtz, he negotiated the final peace settlement in Copenhagen. His son Enevold was selected as hofmester for the king's two youngest sons. Another son, Christoffer, served as hofmester for prince Christian.

== Property and fiefs ==
Parsberg inherited Jernit from his father and Hagsholm from his uncle Manderup Parsberg. His wife brought Svenstrup into his possession (sold 1629). He bought the estates Tulstrup (1629), Løjstrup (1637), Palstrup and Aldrupgård (1640), Norringris (1647), Egeskov (1648, sold 1656) and Lyngballegård (1653). He also owned a 50% stake in the estates in Ørs and Haven (sold 1656). In 1647, Parsberg's holdings covered 2,640 tønder hartkorn and in 1652, it covered 3,163 tønder hartkorn.

His royal fiefs included Ørum (1622–24), Stjernholm (1624–26), Dronningborg (1626–27), Bergenhus (1627–29), Trondhjem (1629–42), Båhus (1642–46), Skanderborg (1646–50) and Vestervig (1650–61). During his time as lensmann of Trondheim, he was a co-owner of Ytterøens Copper Works. In 1633, he paid for a new vault and chancel at Trondheim Cathedral.

== Personal life ==
On 16 June 1622, Parsberg married Karen Kruse of Svenstrup (1600–1661). She was a daughter of privy councillor and governor-general in Norway Enevold Kruse and Else Jørgensdatter Marsvin (1575–1632). Their son Christoffer Parsberg served as Vice Chancellor of Denmark. Their son Enevold Parsberg served as county governor of Abrahamstrup.
