= Axwarbed =

Axwar(r)bed ("stablemaster") was a Sasanian title which was held by officials in control of the royal stables.

== Sources ==
- Pourshariati, Parvaneh (2008), Decline and Fall of the Sasanian Empire: The Sasanian-Parthian Confederacy and the Arab Conquest of Iran, London and New York: I.B. Tauris, ISBN 978-1-84511-645-3
- Daryaee, Touraj (2009). Sasanian Persia: The Rise and Fall of an Empire. I.B.Tauris. pp. 1–240. ISBN 978-0857716668.
- Tafazzoli, Ahmad (1987). "ĀXWARRBED". Encyclopaedia Iranica, Vol. VIII, Fasc. 2. p. 124.
