= Torbenfeldt =

Manor house in Holbæk Municipality, Denmark

Torbenfeldt Castle
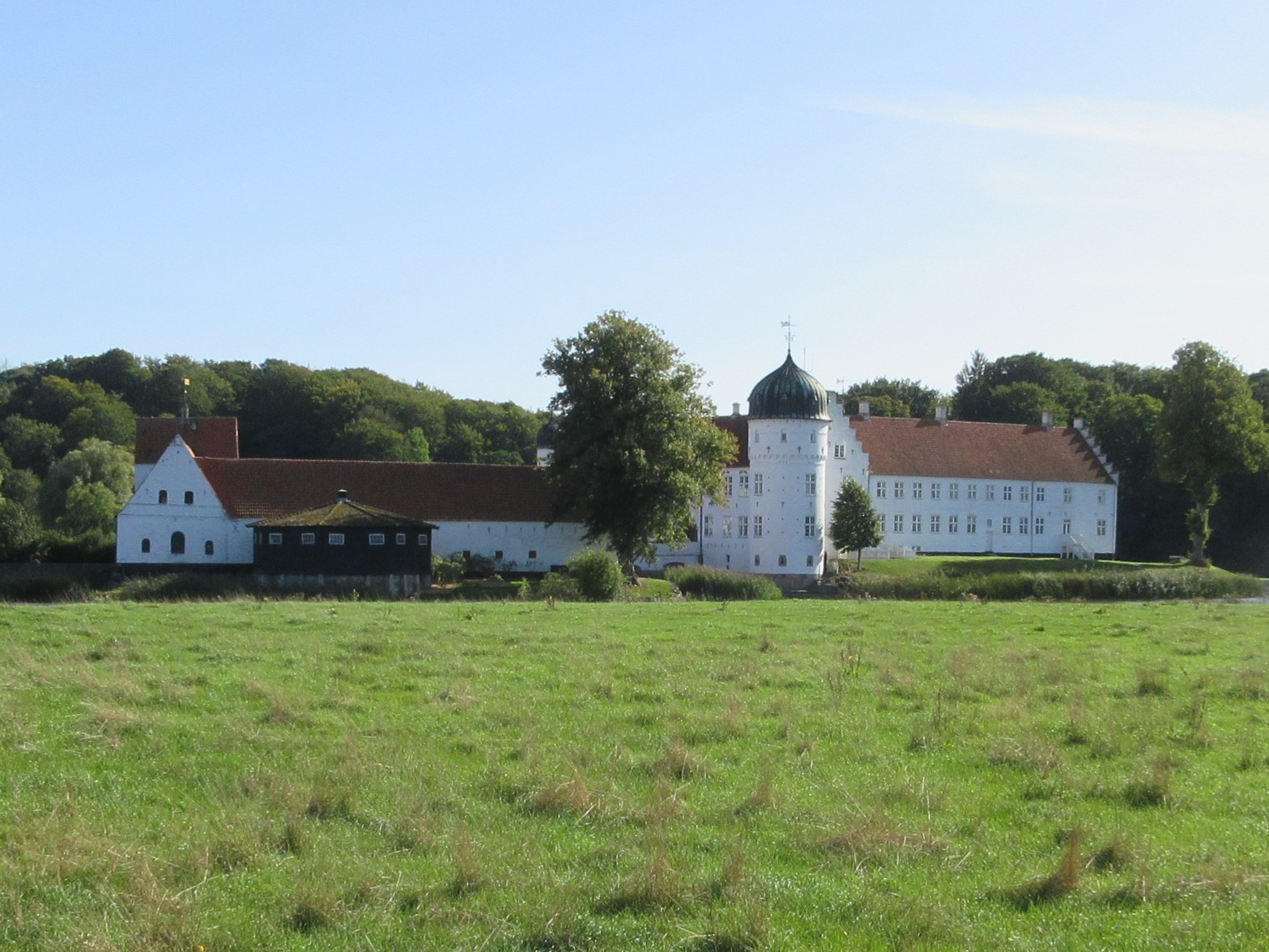
- Torbenfeldt in September 2020

General information
- Location: Holbæk Municipality, Denmark
- Coordinates: 55°38′19″N 11°31′04″E

Torbenfeldt Castle is a manor house located 15 km south-west of Holbæk on the island of Zealand in eastern Denmark. The estate covers 1,711 hectares of land (2000).

== History ==
=== Origins ===
The origin of the name Torbenfeldt is unclear, but it may refer to Torben Nielsen (died 1310), who was married to a sister of Marsk Stig's first wife.

Torbensfeldt is first mentioned in 1377. Early owners include members of the noble Moltke, Gøye and Brahe families.

=== Frydendal, 1666n – 1765 ===
In 1668 the estate was acquired by King Frederick III, who renamed it Frydendal. The king died in 1670, and his son Prince George ceded the estate to Christoffer Parsberg in exchange for Jungshoved at Vordingborg in 1671. An important figure in the central administration, Parsberg was created count that same year. However, he died just a few months later. Parsberg's daughter (1671–1684), Anne Cathrine Pogwisch (née Parsberg), kept the estate until 1684.

The estate was then owned by different noble families.

=== Hansen and van Deurs families, 1765–1873 ===
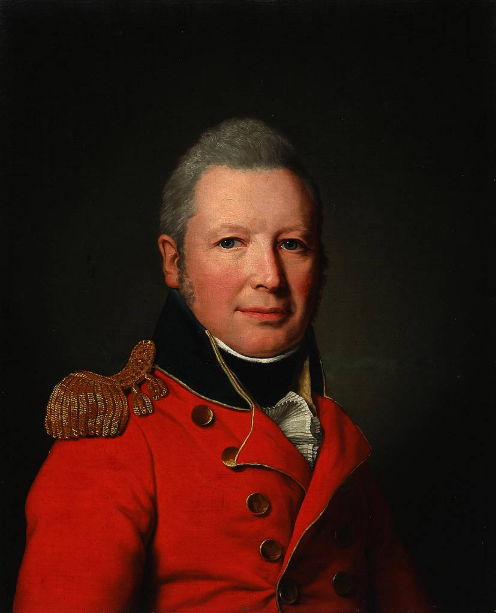
Jacob Friederich (Frederik) van Deurs wearing his red chamberlain's uniform.

In 1765, Frudendal was acquired by Stephen Hansen. His widow kept the estate until her death. The estate was later owned by his son Wilhelm August Hansen until his death in 1796. He refurbished the dilapidated buildings and was an excellent farmer. He was a member of the Royal Danish Agricultural Society and the Great Danish Agricultural Commission of 1685. Wilhelm August Hansen was married twice, first to Jacobæa Elisabeth Graah (1752–1675) and then to her sister Inger Charlotte Graah (1747–1818).

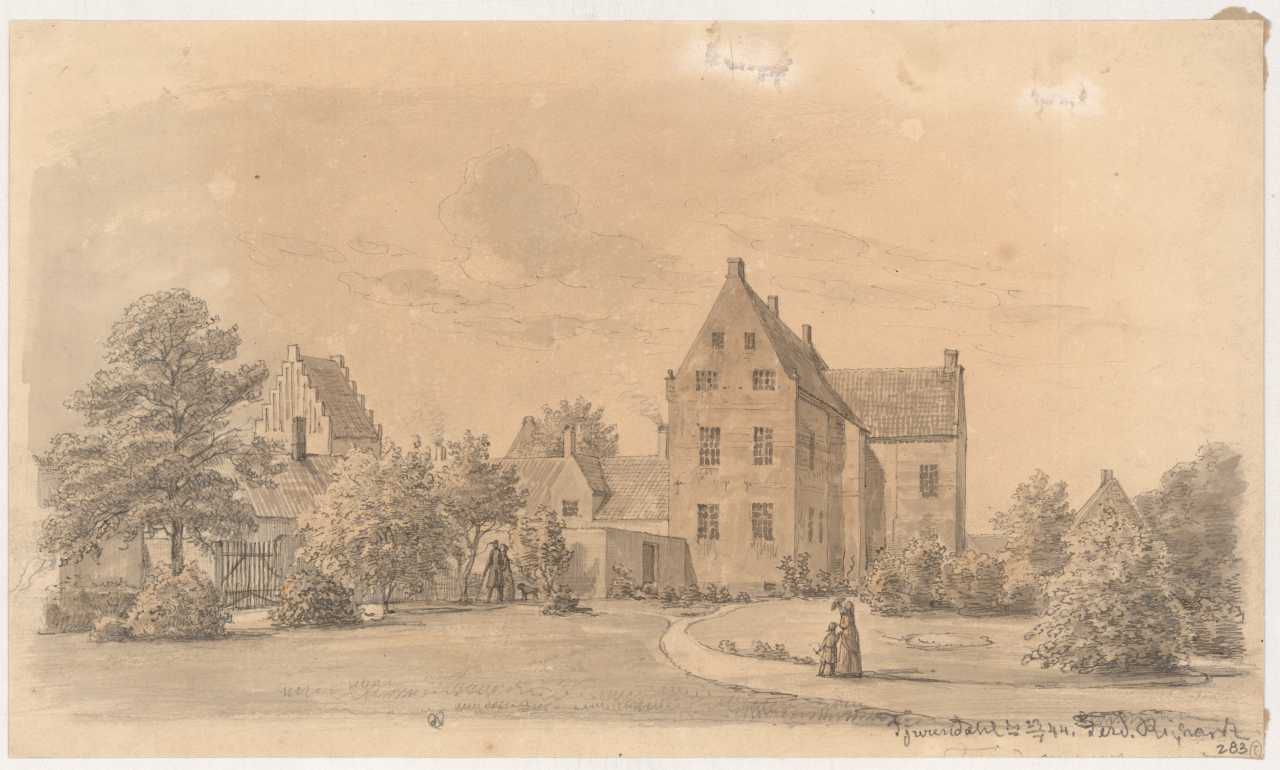
Frydendal on a drawing by Ferdinand Richardt, 1844

In 1801, Inger Ravn-Hansen sold the estate to her nephew Jacob Frederik van Deurs. He was the son of Jan Christoffer van Deurs and her then-deceased husband's sister Birgitte Cathrine Hansen. The estate was later owned by Jacob Friederich van Deurs' son Carl Eduard van Deurs until 1873.

Jacob van Deurs and Edward van Deurs were both awarded the title of chamberlain (kammerherre).

=== Treschow family ===
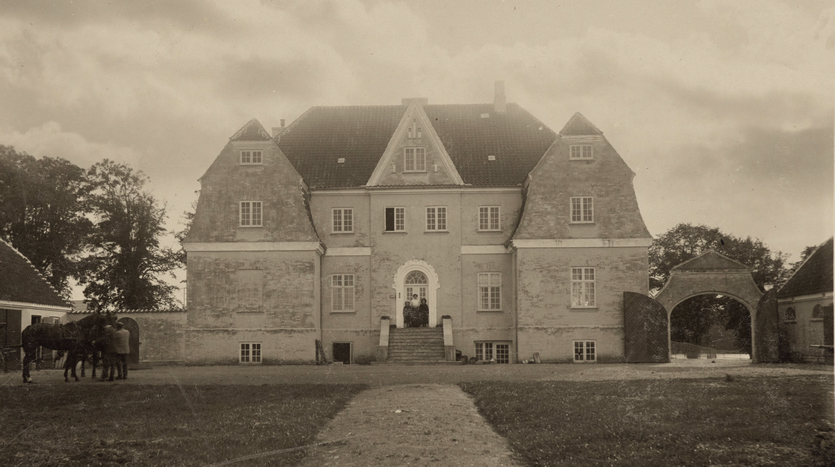
The manager's house from 1907.

In 1873, Torbenfeldt was acquired by Christian Rosenkilde Treschow. Torbenfeldt has been owned by members of the Treschow family since then. The name of the estate was changed back to Torbenfeldt in 1906.

A new manager's house for the manager of the estate was constructed in 1907 to designs by the architect Iver Bentsen. It was demolished in the 1760s.

== Architecture ==
The three-winged main building is located on an artificial island in a small lake and reflects the long history of the property. Part of the south wing dates from the 15th century but was altered and expanded with a tower in the 1650s. The eastern gate wing is from 1577 but was adapted in 1755. The north wing is from 1767 except for the corner tower, which is from 1906 when the entire complex was restored by C. M. Smidt.

Frydendal Church is located close by.

== Today ==
The estate covers 1,711 hectares of land (2000).

== Cultural references ==
Torbenfeldt has been used as a location in the feature films Komtessen paa Steenholt (1939), Arvingen (1954), Kampen om Næsbygård (1964), Næsbygårds arving (1965) and Krybskytterne paa Næsbygaard (1966).

== Owners ==
- (1377–1405) Evert Moltke
- (1405–1436) Gertrud Grubendal
- (1436–1443) Herman von Oertzen
- (1443–1492) Engelbrecht Albrechtsen Bydelsbak
- (1492–1500) Laurids Engelbrecht Bydelsbak
- (1500–1525) Mette Lauridsdatter Bydelsbak gift Gjøe
- (1525–1558) Albrecht Gjøe
- (1558–1589) Anne Ottosdatter Rosenkrantz gift Gjøe
- (1589–1616) Dorte Albrechtsdatter Gjøe
- (1616–1642) Otte Pedersen Brahe
- (1642–1666) Manderup Ottesen Brahe
- (1666–1668) Birgitte Brahe née Trolle
- (1668–1670) Frederick III
- (1670–1671) Christian V
- (1671) Christoffer Parsberg
- (1671–1684) Anne Cathrine Parsberg gift Pogwisch
- (1684) Rasmus Vinding
- (1684–1687) Poul Vinding
- (1687–1707) Johan Rantzau
- (1707–1710) Christian Rantzau-Friis
- (1710–1713) Erik Steensen
- (1713–1714) Vibeke Urne gift Steensen
- (1714–1717) Vincents Lerche
- (1717–1731) Albrecht Philip von Eynden
- (1731–1762) Vibeke von Eynden née Krag
- (1762–1765) Bartholomæus Bertelsen de Cederfeld
- (1765–1770) Stephen Hansen
- (1770–1773) Dorothea Sophie Hansen née Ravn
- (1773–1774) Slægten Ravn-Hansen
- (1774–1796) Vilhelm August Hansen
- (1796–1801) Inger Charlotte Graah gift Ravn-Hansen
- (1801–1851) Jacob Frederik van Deurs
- (1851–1852) van Deurs family
- (1852–1873) Carl Eduard van Deurs
- (1873–1906) Christian Rosenkilde Treschow
- (1906–1948) Frederik Treschow
- (1952–1985) Fritz Treschow
- (1985-present) Peter Rosenkilde Treschow

== See also ==
- List of historic houses on Zealand
