= Manderup Parsberg =

Danish nobleman and politician (1546–1625)

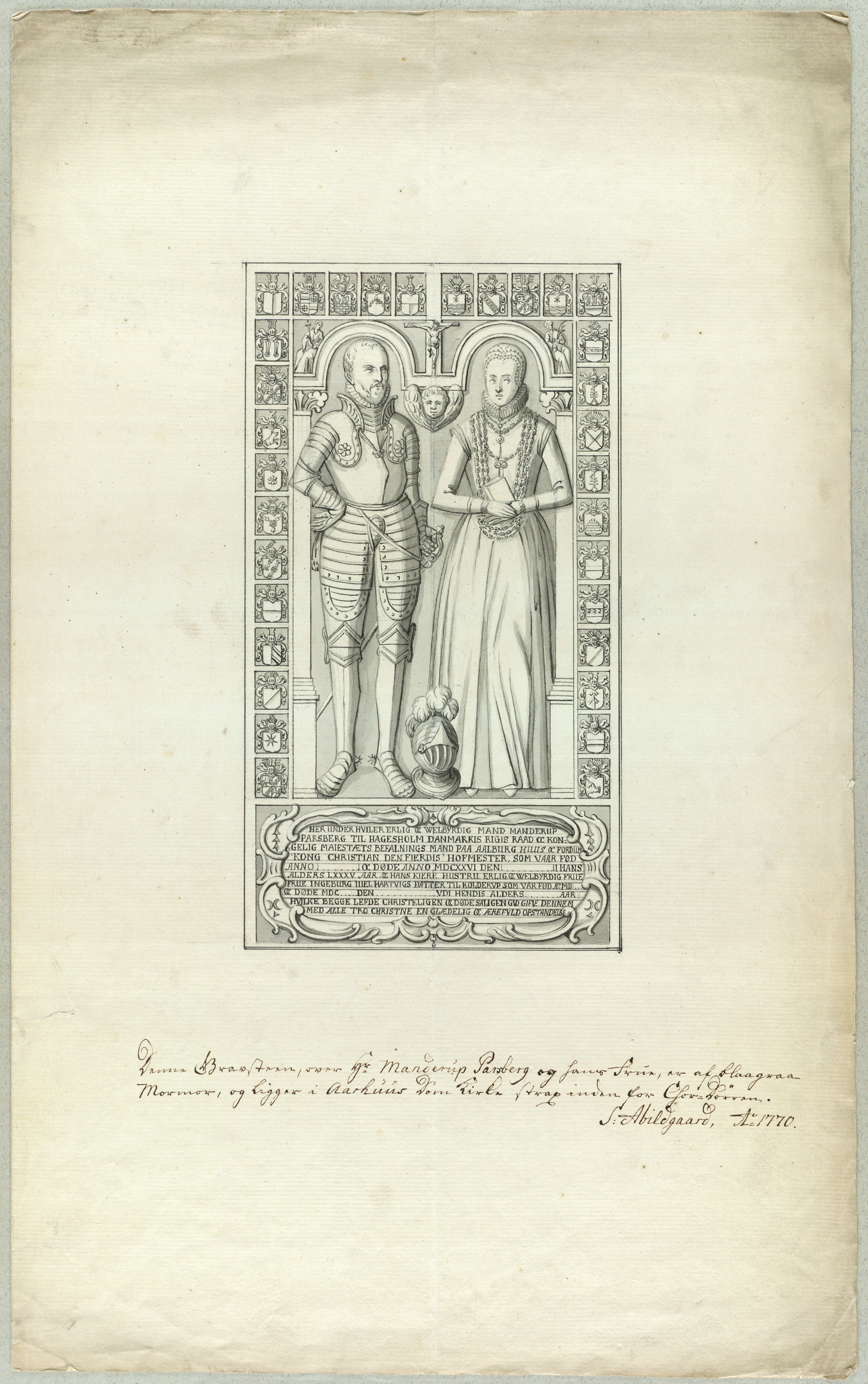
Manderup Parsberg depicted on his ledgerstone. Drawing by Søren Abildgaard, 1770

Manderup Parsberg (24 December 1546 – 11 November 1625) was a Danish nobleman and politician who was member of the Royal Privy Council to King Christian IV of Denmark.

== Early life and education ==
Manderup Parsberg was the son of privy councilor Verner Parsberg (1511-67) and Anne Holck (died 1591). He studied at the University of Wittenberg (1565) and Rostock (1567) as part of his ground tour.

As a student at the University of Rostock, he participated in a duel against his third cousin, Tycho Brahe in which he cut off most of his nose. The two later became good friends, and Parsberg married Tycho's distant cousin Anne Pedersdatter Brahe (1578–1633). Parsberg was lord to Hagesholm.

== Politician and diplomat ==
Manderup Parsberg, Henrik Below and Nicolaus Theophilus were appointed ambassadors to Scotland in 1585 and arrived in June. James VI appointed Sir James Melville of Halhill, William Schaw, and the Laird of Segie to be companions to the Danish ambassadors. Melville described the events of the embassy. At Dunfermline Palace they discussed the disputed ownership of the Orkney Islands. It was also rumoured they discussed the king's marriage. They were not treated in the usual manner but had to pay their own expenses, and when they were to travel to St Andrews the promised horses were late. At St Andrews they suffered some abuse organised by supporters of the pro-French faction. A leading courtier, James Stewart, Earl of Arran, who had served in Sweden was a ringleader. The English ambassador Edward Wotton helped them because England and Denmark were allies, and told them privately that James VI had criticised Danish customs and their king Frederick II. According to Melville, the Danish envoys considered leaving Scotland, but he persuaded them to continue and spoke to James VI in their favour. When the mission was concluded, the three Danish ambassadors were supposed to receive gifts of gold chains but these were not ready.

The Master of Gray described the discussion in the Parliament of Scotland in July 1585 to give an answer to the Danish embassy regarding a league or peace treaty involving England.

Parsberg was involved in a diplomatic discussion at Bremen in 1602, where English shipping, fishing issues, and access to the Sound toll were discussed. The other Danish negotiators were Jonas Charisius and Arnold Witfield. One of English diplomats, Stephen Lesieur sent a portrait of Elizabeth I to Christian IV of Denmark.

When, in a funeral oration for Tycho Brahe, an allusion was made to an unfortunate duel, Parsberg protested and sought redress through King Christian, stating that they had been good friends from that time onward, and that the injury Brahe suffered had been accidental, in the course of a fair fight. On this basis he wished the reference to be removed from the oration.

== Personal life and property ==
On 26 September 1574, Parsberg married Ingeborg Juel (1544-1615). She was the daughter of Hartvig Juel til Palsgård (died 1572) and Maren Eriksdatter Tornekrands til Kollerup (died 1572). On 8 September 1616, Parsberg married secondly to Anne Brahe (1578-1633). She was the daughter of Peder Brahe til Krogholm (died 1610) and Margrethe Albretsdatter Gøye til Krenkerup etc (died 1594). He had no children.

In 1583, Parsberg acquired the estate Hagsholm. After his death it was passed to his nephew Oluf Parsberg.

He died on 11 November 1625 and was buried in Aarhus Cathedral. Søren Abildgaard created a drawing of his ledgerstone in 1770.
