= Peder Reedtz =

Danish landowner

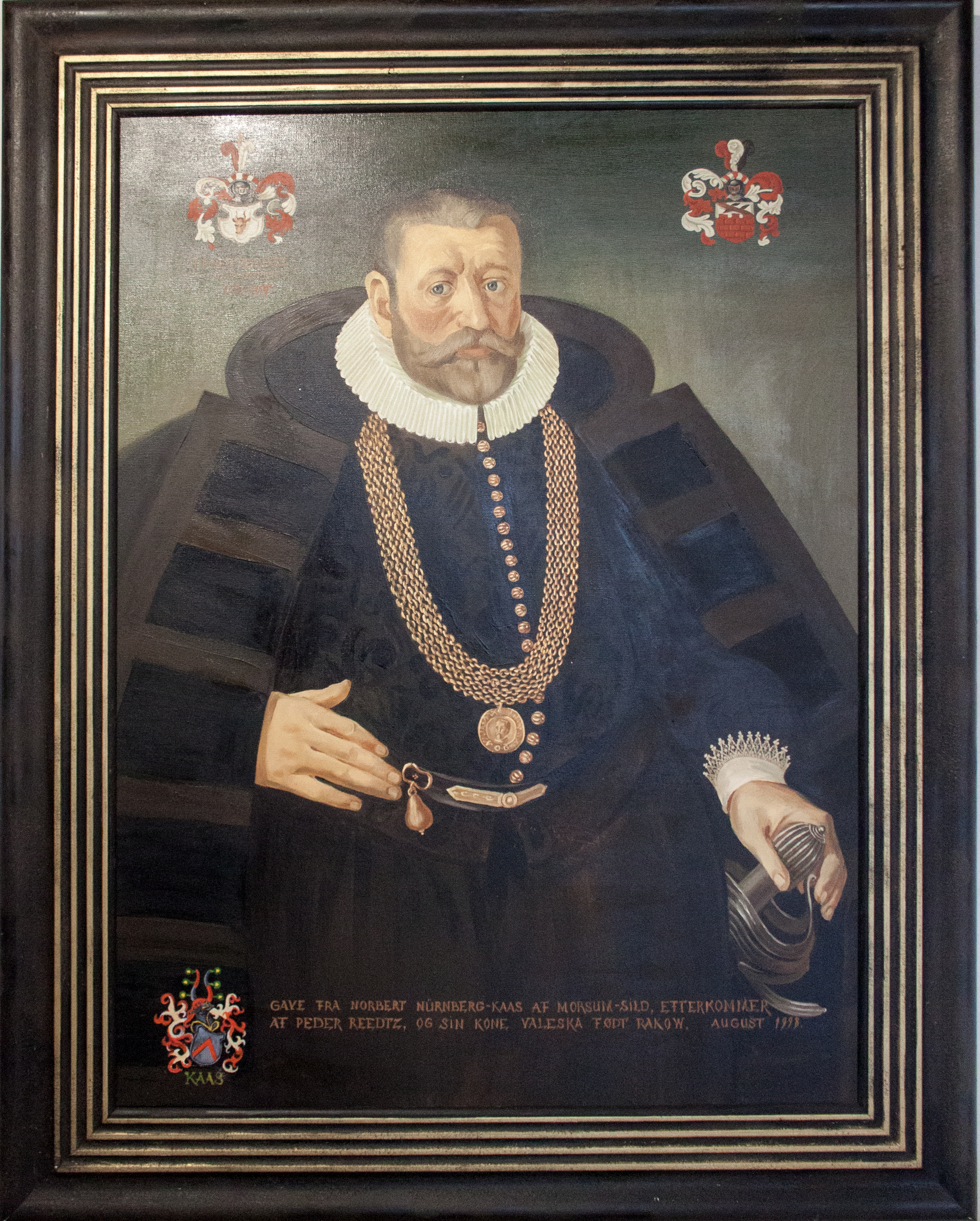
Peder Reedtz

Peder Reedtz (1531 – 21 September 1607), a favourite of Frederick II of Denmark, was an avener, lensmann, and landowner. He owned Hørbygaard and Tygestrup (now Kongsdal) at Holbæk.

== Early life and education ==
Reedtz was born at Schultendorp in Mark Brandenburg, the son of Michel Reedtz of Schultendorp and Sophia Lambertsdatter Bomstedt. He lost his parents in an early age. He received a military education in Germany, France and Livland.

== Career ==
Reedtz came to Denmark at the outbreak of the Northern Seven Years' War where he maintained particularly close ties to Daniel Rantzau. He left the country in 1570 but soon returned and was in 1872 appointed hofjunker and the following year as avener.

Reedtz resigned from the position as avener in 1580 and was instead granted the fiefs of Sorø (until 1584) and Antvorskov (until 1478). In 1587–88, he served as lensmann of Korsør. After his marriage he was also granted the fief of Saltø for his and his wife's lifetimes.

== Holdings ==
In 1586, Frederick II presented him with Hørbygaard at Holbæk. In 1587, he acquired Tygestrup from the king in exchange for some of his wife's property in Jutland. He dissolved the village and replaced it by a manor (later renamed Kongsdal). An in inscription on the building expressed his gratitude towards the king. He lost many of his privileges at the royal court when Frederik II died.

== Personal life ==
Reedtz married Karen Rostrup (died 1636) a daughter of Jørgen Rostrup (died 1563) and Margrethe Andersdatter Skeel (died 1568 or later), on25 February 1582 at Copenhagen Castle. He was the father of Frederik Reedtz.

He died at Tygestrup on 21 September 1607 and is buried at Hørby Church.
