= Henrik Span =

Henrik Span (17 April 1634 – 27 December 1694) was a naval officer in the Dutch, Venetian and Danish navies. He reached the rank of Admiral in the Royal Danish Navy in 1683 and headed the Royal Danish Naval Dockyard in Copenhagen from 1690. In 1692, he was granted Hørbygaard at Holbæk and raised to the peerage by Christian V of Denmark.

== Early life ==
Span was born in Oldendorf in the County of Schaumburg, the son of consul Bernhard Span and Elisabeth Beichmann. He joined the merchant navy at an early age, and was for a short while a prisoner of the French.

== Naval career ==
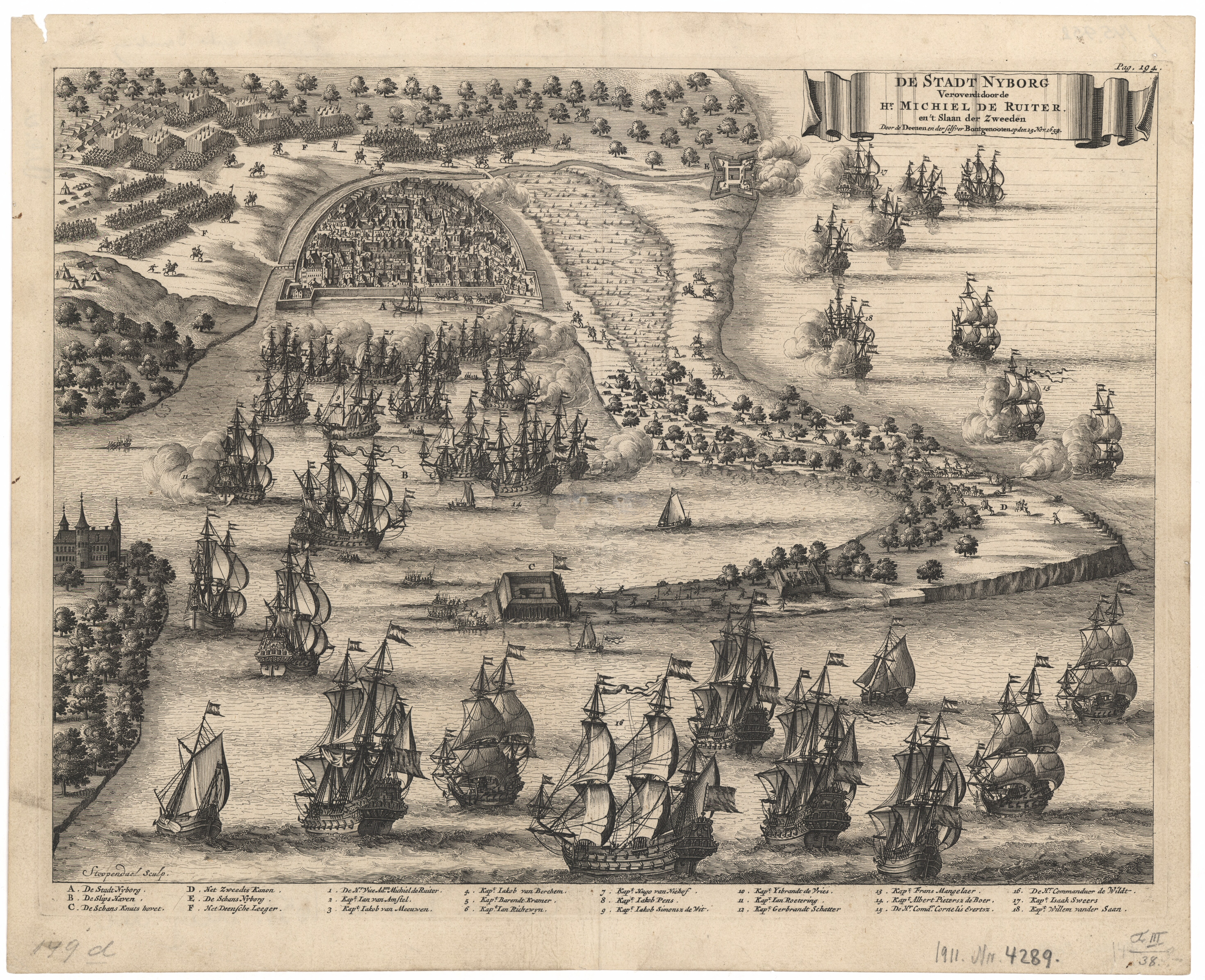
The Battle of Nyborg, 1659.

Span enrolled in the Royal Dutch Navy where in 1652–54 he served in the war with England. In 1654–58, he served in the Venetian navy in the war against the Ottoman Empire. In 1658, he returned to the Royal Dutch Navy. He served under Michael de Ruyter when an expeditionary fleet was sent to Denmark where it managed to liberate Nyborg in November 1659. He then returned to the Netherlands where he began to sail for Dutch India, first as a navigator and from 1664 as a master. He was in East Asia in 1665–71 but then returned to the Netherlands.

He was in 1672 appointed as captain in the Royal Dutch Navy and was promoted to commander in 1674 after distinguishing himself in the war against England.

In May 1677, he enrolled in the Royal Danish Navy with rank of captain of the first class. He commanded Norske Løve in the Battle of Køge Bay on 1 July and was then appointed as Vice Admiral and command of a squadron in the Baltic Sea fleet under Admiral General Cornelis Tromp. He took part in the expeditionary fleet to Öland and lost an eye during the conquest of Borgholm. He then took command of a squadron under Niels Juel, took part in the expeditionary fleet which was sent to Rügen in 1678 and headed the Siege of Kalmar in 1679.

== Shipbuilding ==
Span became a member of the Admiralty in 1678. In 1680, he was appointed as inspector of Bremerholm. In 1683, he was promoted to Admiral. In 1684, he was sent to Ertholmene to establish a port and fortress on Christiansø.

Span was also charged with overseeing the work of the English shipbuilder who worked at Royal Danish Naval Dockyards at Holmen in 1687–90 and who was dismissed after cooperation problems with Span. A new position as Head of Holmen was created for Span in 1690. He immediately embarked on reorganizing the naval base and associated dockyards. Nyholm was inaugurated that same year and Span was responsible for the construction of the first ship there, the ship-of-the-line Dannebroge, which was launched in 1692.

Span was the first shipbuilder in Denmark who constructed ships based on mathematical principles and graphical designs. He created the designs for two naval ships (ships of the line) and three merchant ships. He also designed floating docks, cannon and mortars.

== Personal life ==
Span married twice. His first wife was Albertzie Claesdatter. They married in approximately 1660 in the Netherlands but the marriage was dissolved in 1674. His second wife was Susanne Christine Schönbach (c. 1657–1722), a daughter of landkansler Johann Christoph S. (1616–1683) and Susanne Elisabeth Lange (1621–1673). They married in February 1686. They had one daughter, Charlotte Amalie Henriksdatter Span. She married Hans August v. Pagelsen (1663–1723) but the couple had no children.

Christian V granted him Hørbygaard at Holbæk in 1692. He was that same year ennobled. He died on 27 December 1694 in Copenhagen and is buried in Hørby Church.

== Citations ==
- (in Danish)T. A. Topsøe-Jensen og Emil Marquard (1935) “Officerer i den dansk-norske Søetat 1660-1814 og den danske Søetat 1814-1932“. Two volumes. Download here.
