= Elisabeth Christine Berling =

Danish businessperson (1744–1801)

- Died: 1801 (aged 56–57)
- Occupations: Businessperson, Printer, Brewer
- Notable work: Laerde Erfterretninger cultural magazine
- Predecessor: Anna Magdalena Godiche
- Spouse: Georg Christopher Berling
- Mother: Anna Magdalena Godiche

Elisabeth Christine Berling (1744-1801) was a Danish businessperson.

She was the daughter of the printer Andreas Hartvig Godiche and the printer Anna Magdalena Godiche and married the printer and brewer Georg Christopher Berling in 1772.

In 1778, she took over the printing business of her late husband. It had the royal privilege and monopoly to print political documents, and publish official announcements of the crown in its newspaper Berlingske Tidende. She personally launched the cultural magazine Laerde Erfterretninger, which was the leading literary magazine in Denmark of its time. In addition to the Berling printing press, she also inherited the printing business of her mother in 1781. Elisabeth Christine Berling was a major figure within the Danish media world of her time.

In addition to the two printing firms, she also managed the brewery of her late husband, which was among the larger breweries in Copenhagen at the time. Of the female brewers active in Copenhagen during this period, only Berling and Marie Martine Bonfils are documented as having accumulated substantial wealth.

== See also ==
- List of women printers and publishers before 1800
