= Christoffer Parsberg =

Danish statesman and landowner (1632–1671)

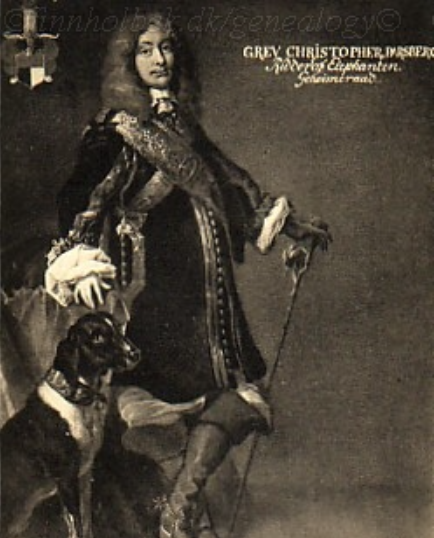
Christoffer Parsberg.

Christoffer Parsberg (17 December 1632 – 24 August 1671) was a Danish vice chancellor, Supreme Court justice and landowner. He was a member of the 3rd Law Committee that prepared Christian V's Danish Code. He owned the estates Jungshoved, Frydendal (now Torbenfeldt), Kongsdal and Gammel Køgegård. He was created a count shortly prior to his death in August 1671.

== Early life and education ==
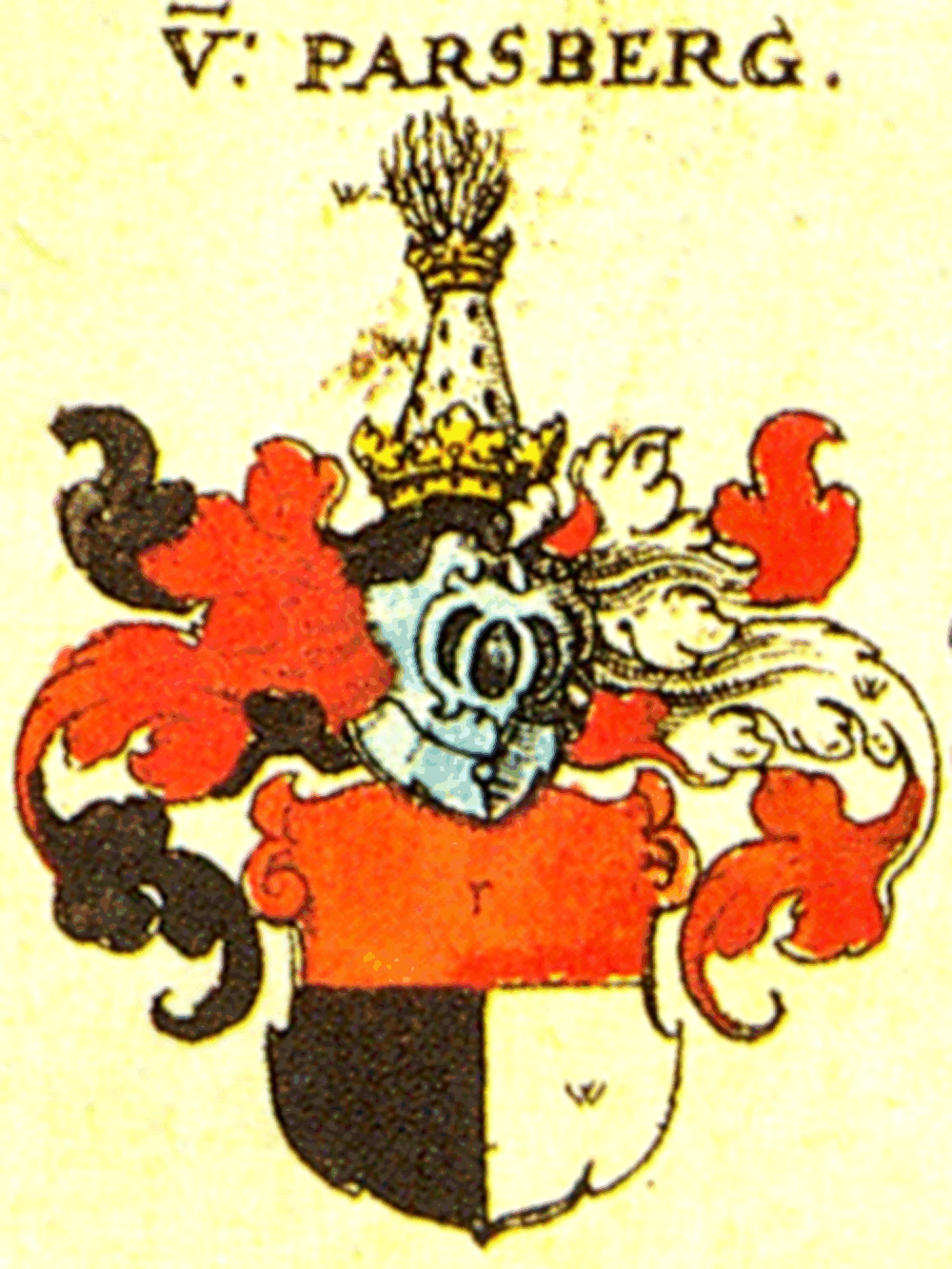
Coat of arms

Christoffer Parsberg was born on 17 December 1632 to Oluf Parsberg and Karen Enevoldsdatter Kruse. His father was a major landowner, whose estates included Palstrup, Jernit and Hagesholm. Parsberg attended Sorø Academy in 1647. He then went on a Grand Tour abroad from 1648 to 1653, during which he studied at the University of Strasbourg.

== Career ==
Immediately after his return, Parsberg became a court page in 1653. For a short time, he served as Danish envoy in London, later becoming a chamberlain in 1658. During the Siege of Copenhagen, he was responsible for inspection of the garrison. In September 1659, he was sent as an envoy to the peace congress in Oliva, but failed to postpone the conclusion of peace between Sweden and Brandenburg until the negotiations between Denmark and Sweden had reached a result. After the Treaty of Oliva was signed in April 1660, he returned to Copenhagen.

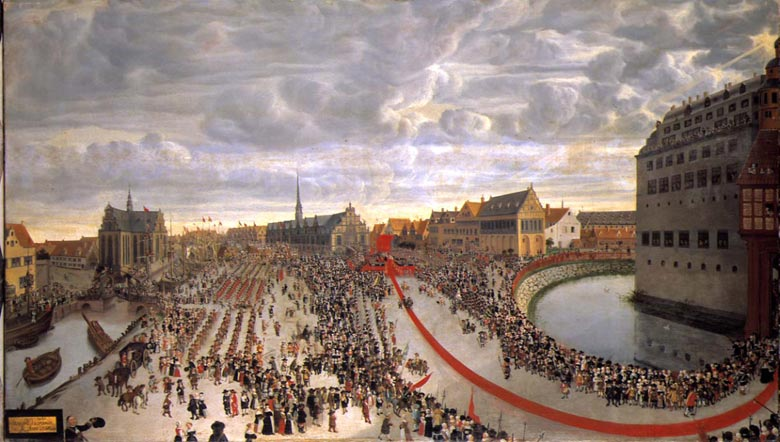
Arvehyldningen at Copenhagen Castle, 1660.

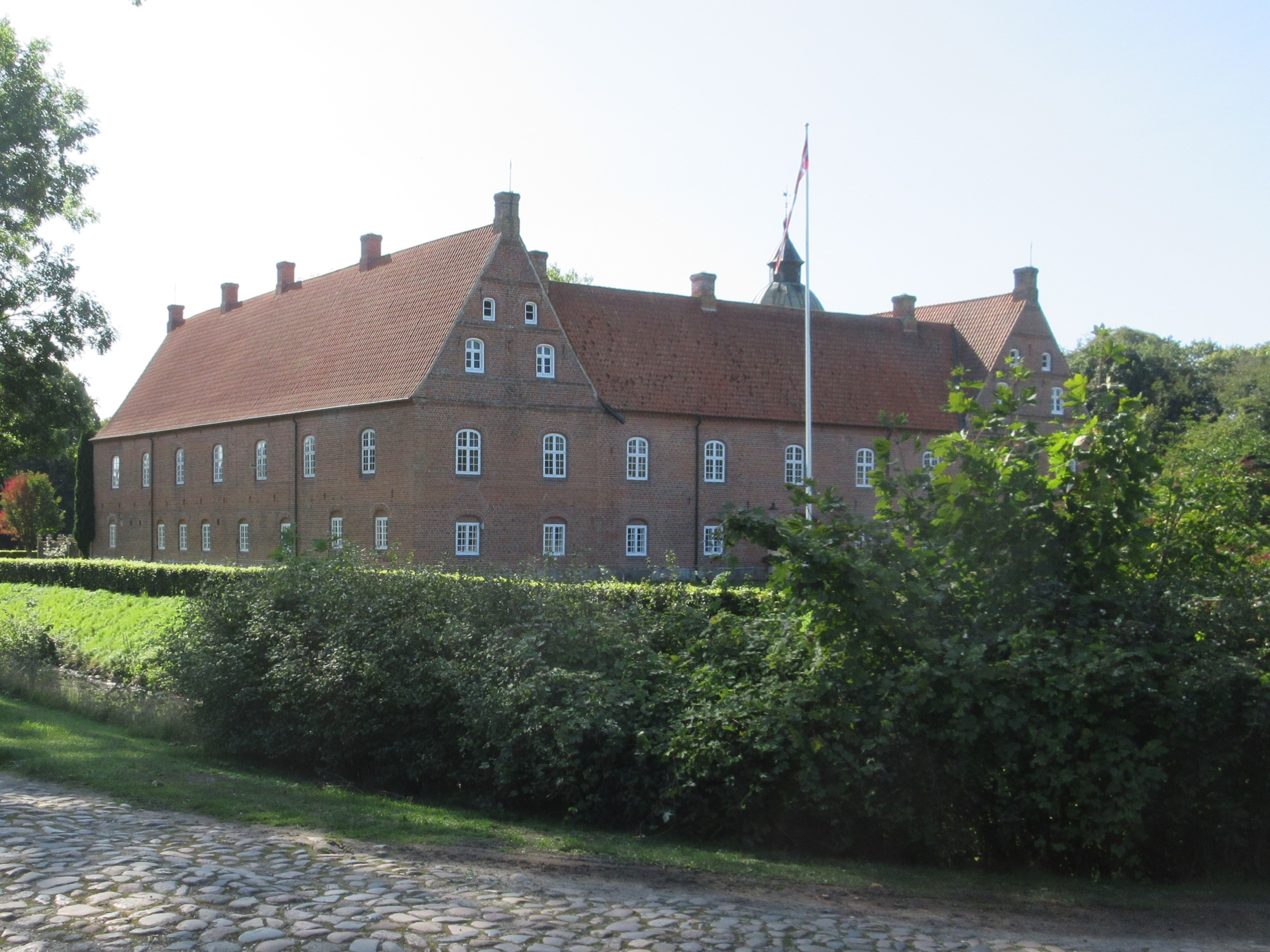
Kongsdal at Holbæk

On the day of the so-called Arvehyldningen on 18 October 1660, when Frederick III was recognized as the first absolute monarch of Denmark-Norway, he was appointed hosmester for the heir apparent, Prince Christian, and accompanied him from May 1662 to August 1663 on his grand tour through the Netherlands to England and France and back through Germany. In 1662, he had received Lister County in Norway as a fief, which he retained until he became the county governor of Vordingborg County in 1664. In the following year, he was also granted Jungshoved Len as property, partly as compensation for unpaid salary and partly by special royal grace. He was later made a member of the 3rd Law Committee in 1666, in which capacity he prepared a draft for a Danish Code. In February 1669, he was appointed as a member of the State Council (Geheimeråd) and the Supreme Court.

In 1667, he became a Knight in the Order of the Elephant. In 1668, he became Vice Chancellor in the Danish Chancellery and in April 1670 a member of the newly established Gehejmekonseil.

In 1671, Parsberg ceded Jungshoved to Prince George in return for Frydendal and Kongsdal. In the same year, on 23 May 1671, Parsberg was raised to Count.

== Personal life and legacy ==
Parsberg was married to Birgitte Skeel on 29 September 1669. She was a daughter of privy councillor Christen Albertsen Skeel and the widow of the Scanian nobleman Christian Barnekow (1626–1666). She brought Gammel Køgegård into the marriage.

Parsberg died on 24 August 1671. His funeral procession took place with great splendor in Copenhagen. His widow was later married to gehejmeråd Knud Thott.
