= Volrad August von der Lühe =

Danish court official

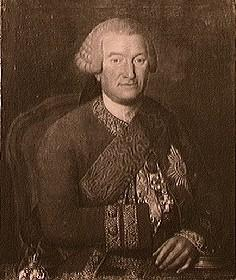
- Portrait of von der Lühe by Ulrich Ferdinandt Beenfeldt, 1773
- Born: October 28, 1705
- Died: April 1, 1778 (aged 72); Copenhagen, Denmark
- Resting place: Church of the Holy Spirit, Copenhagen
- Spouse(s): Cathrine Marie von Vieregg (1747–d. 1764); Margrethe von der Lühe (1767–1778)
- Honours: Order of the Dannebrog (1745); Ordre de l'Union Parfaite (1747); Order of the Elephant (1768)

Volrad August von der Lühe (28 November 1705 – 1 April 1778) was a Danish court official who served under three Danish kings. He served as Lord President (Overpræsident) in Copenhagen from 1754 until his removal by J. F. Struense in 1771. He also served as Director-General (Overdirektør) of the Royal Danish Theatre and Frederiks Hospital. He was married to Margrethe von der Lühe, overhofmesterinde for queen dowager Juliana Maria.

== Early life and career ==
He was born on 28 November 1705 to captain Diderik Otto von der Lühe of Dambek (1670–1709) and Charlotte Amalie du Puits.

In 1735, he was appointed kammerjunker by Christian VI. In 1743, he was appointed overkammerjunker) for crown prince Frederick. In 1746, he was promoted to chamberlain (jammerherre). In 1754, Frederick V appointed him to the important post of Lord President (Overpræsident) in Copenhagen. At the same time, he was also appointed Director-General (Overdirektør) of the Royal Danish Theatre. In 1757, he was also appointed Director-General of Frederiks Hospital. During the reighn of Christian VII, von der Lühe was also put in charge of the king's private means (partikulærkassen). He also served as maître des requêtes at the royal court.

In 1771, J. F. Struensee removed him from all his posts. He continued in a role as grand maître des cérémonies and secretary of Ordenskapitlet.

== Property ==
In 1743, von der Lühe was granted Hørbygaard by the king. In 1746, he sold it to the Castenschiold family. In 1754-61, he was in possession of the Barony of Høgholm (Fævejle and Lykkesholm). In 1776, he was ennobled by Christian VII. He was awarded the title of Gehejmeråd in 1750 and Gehejmekonferensråd in 1764. He was created a White Knight in 1747 and a Blue Knight in 1768. In 1760-70, von der Lühe owned the country house Retraite at Skodsborg.

== Personal life ==
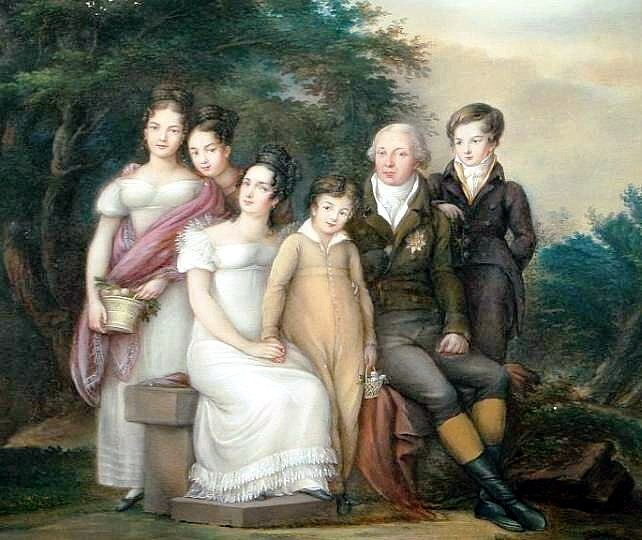
Volrad August von der Lühe with his family

On 25 September 1747, von der Lühe was married to Catharina Maria von Vieregg (1717–1764). She was the widow of captain Christian Ludvig von Hein of Ziersdorf (1696–1743). Her parents were Jørgen Frederik v. V. of Zierstorf (died 1726) and Antoinette Juliane von Hausmann. Together, they had one son, Christian Carl Frederik Ludvig von der Lühe. After the death of his first wife, he was remarried on 6 May 1767 to Margrethe Holck (1741–1826). She was the daughter of general-lieutenant Christian Christopher, count Holck (1698–1774) and Ermegaard Sophie, baroness Winterfeldt (1702–56). She and von der Lühe had a son, Carl Gottlob Joachim von der Lühe.

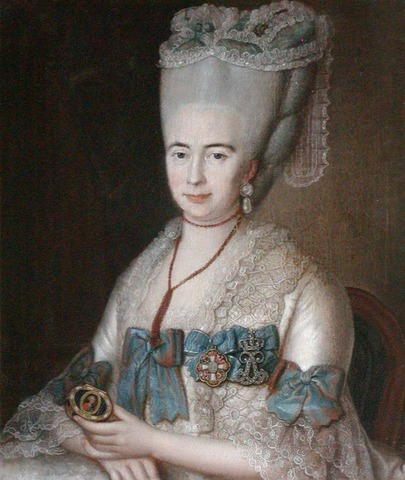
Caroline Mathilde Margrethe, countess Holck-Winterfeldt.

Volrad August von der Lühe died on 28 November 1705 and was buired in the Church of the Holy Ghost. His widow remarried Christian Frederik von Numsen, the last male member of the Numsen family. The couple had no children.

Civic offices
Preceded by Frederik Otto von Rappe	Lord President of Copenhagen; 1743—1771	Succeeded by Ulrik Adolf Holstein
