= Anna Magdalena Godiche =

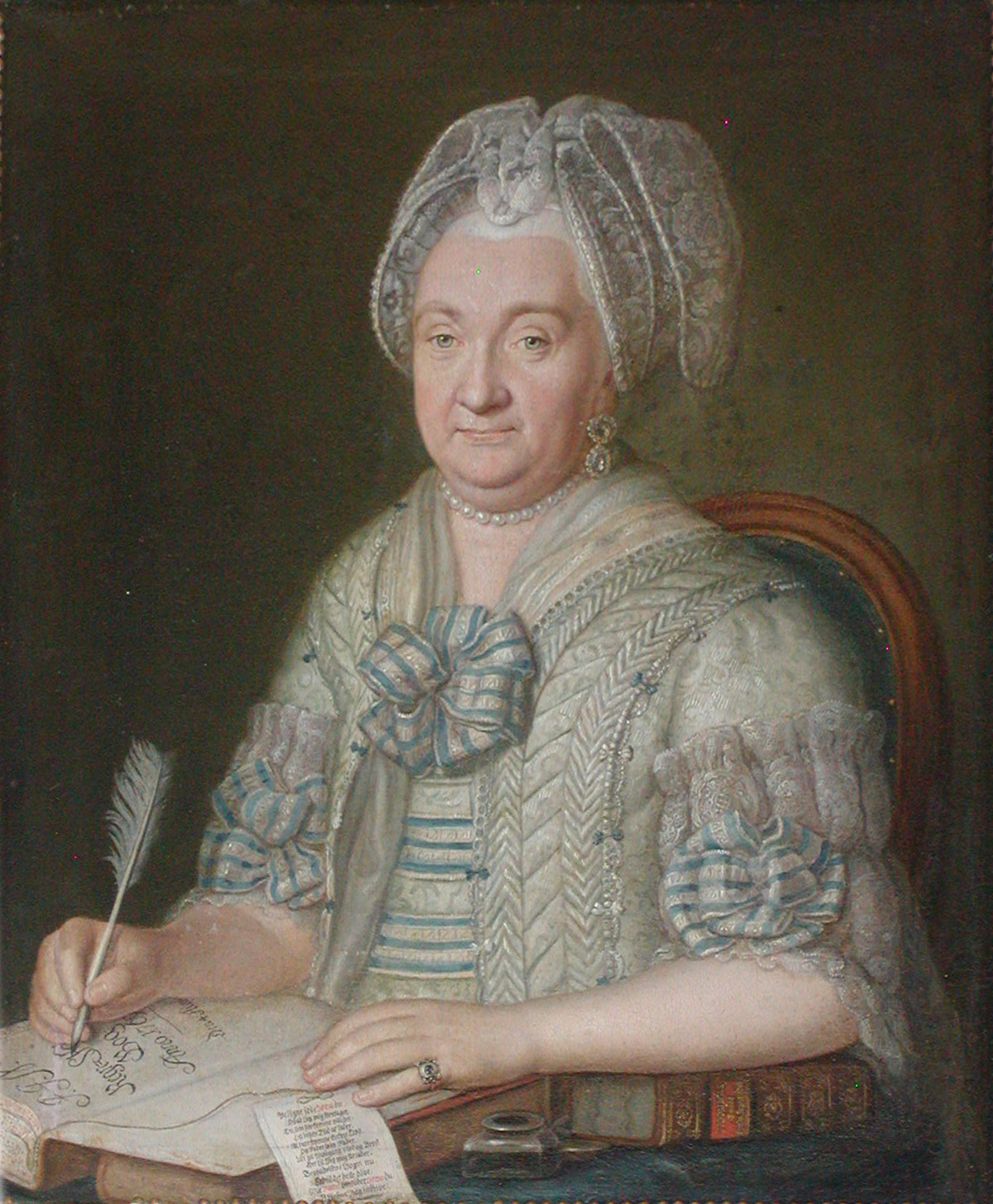
- Anna Magdalena Godiche, 1776
- Born: 11 January 1721
- Died: 22 February 1781 (aged 60)
- Occupations: Book Printer, Publisher
- Known for: Managed the biggest printing company in contemporary Denmark
- Successor: Elisabeth Christine Berling
- Children: Elisabeth Christine Berling

Anna Magdalena Godiche née Høpfner (11 January 1721 – 22 February 1781) was a Danish book printer and publisher. She managed the biggest printing company in contemporary Denmark.

== Biography ==
Anna Magdalena was born to judge Høpfner in Haderslev. She married Andreas Hartvig Godiche (1714-1769) of Copenhagen in 1736. He owned one of the biggest printing companies in Denmark and was one of those contributing to the expansion of book printing in Denmark in the mid 18th century.

She took over the company as a widow and managed it until her death. Her son was mentally unwell and was not able to manage it. She owned the monopoly of printing and publishing the sentences of the de facto regent Johann Friedrich Struensee and Enevold Brandt, who were famously executed in 1772. She specialized in historical works, and printed Andreas Bussæus's Frederik 4.s Dagsregistre (1770), Niels Krag's Christian IIIs Historie (1776–79) and Historiske Efterretninger om velfortiente danske Adelsmænd (1777-79) by Tycho de Hofman.

After her death, the business was inherited by her daughter Elisabeth Christine Berling, who already managed the printing business and brewery of her late spouse and therefore dissolved it.

Anna Magdalena Godiche was the target of Ewald's well known epigram "Madame G."

== See also ==
- List of women printers and publishers before 1800
