= Stable master =

A stable master or head groom is the manager in charge of a stable.

At large horse establishments there may be several grooms under the management of the stable master. In a professional establishment the head groom usually has complete responsibility for the horses including devising training schedules, choosing feeds for optimum nutrition and ensuring the horses are shod, wormed, inoculated and provided with timely veterinary care.

Historically, one kind of stable master was an avener ( /ˈævənər/), or avenor, the chief officer of the stables of a king, and the officer in charge of obtaining positions for horses belonging to the king. The Latin version of the word was avenarius, from the Latin avena, meaning "oats" or "straw". The avenar was under the watch of the Master of the Horse, and in his duties administered the oaths of office to all other stable officials. He was also in charge of stable expense accounts and payroll.

An avenary, related to an avener, was the largest department in the household of the king. There was generally a staff of 100 to 200 valets and grooms which, under the watch of the avenar, tended to the horses of the king, his household, officials and attendants, as well as the horses of royal visitors.

In a private residence the stable master has these responsibilities and must also accommodate the riding schedules of the employer's family and, if necessary, arrange for lessons and training. The stable master must ensure that a groom is on call during specified hours in case any members of the employer's family wish to ride. The stable master is also responsible for the special needs of aged and retired horses, and usually for the maintenance and overall appearance of the stables. The stable master may or may not report to a steward or estate manager.
