= Jewish philosophy =

Philosophy carried out by Jews or in relation to the religion of Judaism

Jewish philosophy (Hebrew: פילוסופיה יהודית) includes all philosophy carried out by Jews or in relation to the religion of Judaism. Until the modern Haskalah (Jewish Enlightenment) and Jewish emancipation, Jewish philosophy was preoccupied with attempts to reconcile coherent new ideas into the tradition of Rabbinic Judaism, thus organizing emergent ideas that are not necessarily Jewish into a uniquely Jewish scholastic framework and worldview. With their admission into broader modern society, Jews with secular educations embraced or developed entirely new philosophies to meet the world's demands in which they now found themselves.

Medieval rediscovery of ancient Greek philosophy among the Geonim of 10th-century Babylonian academies brought rationalist philosophy into Biblical-Talmudic Judaism. During the Geonic period, philosophy was generally in competition with Kabbalah. Both schools would become part of classic Rabbinic literature, though the decline of scholastic rationalism coincided with historical events that drew Jews to the Kabbalistic approach. For the Ashkenazi Jews of Western Europe, emancipation and encounters with secular thought from the 18th century onwards altered how philosophy was viewed. Ashkenazi Jews in Eastern Europe and Sephardi communities had comparatively later, more ambivalent interactions with secular cultures than those of Western Europe. In the varied responses to modernity, Jewish philosophical ideas were developed across a range of emerging religious movements. These developments could be seen as either the continuation of or breaks from the canon of Rabbinic philosophy of the Middle Ages and the other historical dialectic aspects of Jewish thought, resulting in diverse contemporary Jewish attitudes to philosophical methods.

== Ancient Jewish philosophy ==
=== Philo of Alexandria ===
Philo (c. 20 BCE – c. 50 CE) was a Jewish philosopher of antiquity, active in Alexandria and writing in Greek, who sought to harmonize biblical theology with Greek philosophical traditions, particularly Platonism, Pythagoreanism, and Aristotelianism, though he also drew from other Hellenistic schools. He attempted to fuse and harmonize Greek and Jewish philosophy through allegory, which he learned from Jewish exegesis and Stoicism. Philo attempted to make his philosophy the means of defending and justifying Jewish religious truths. These truths he regarded as fixed and determinate, and philosophy was used as an aid to truth, and a means of arriving at it. To this end Philo chose from philosophical tenets of Greeks, refusing those that did not harmonize with Judaism such as Aristotle's doctrine of the eternity and indestructibility of the world.

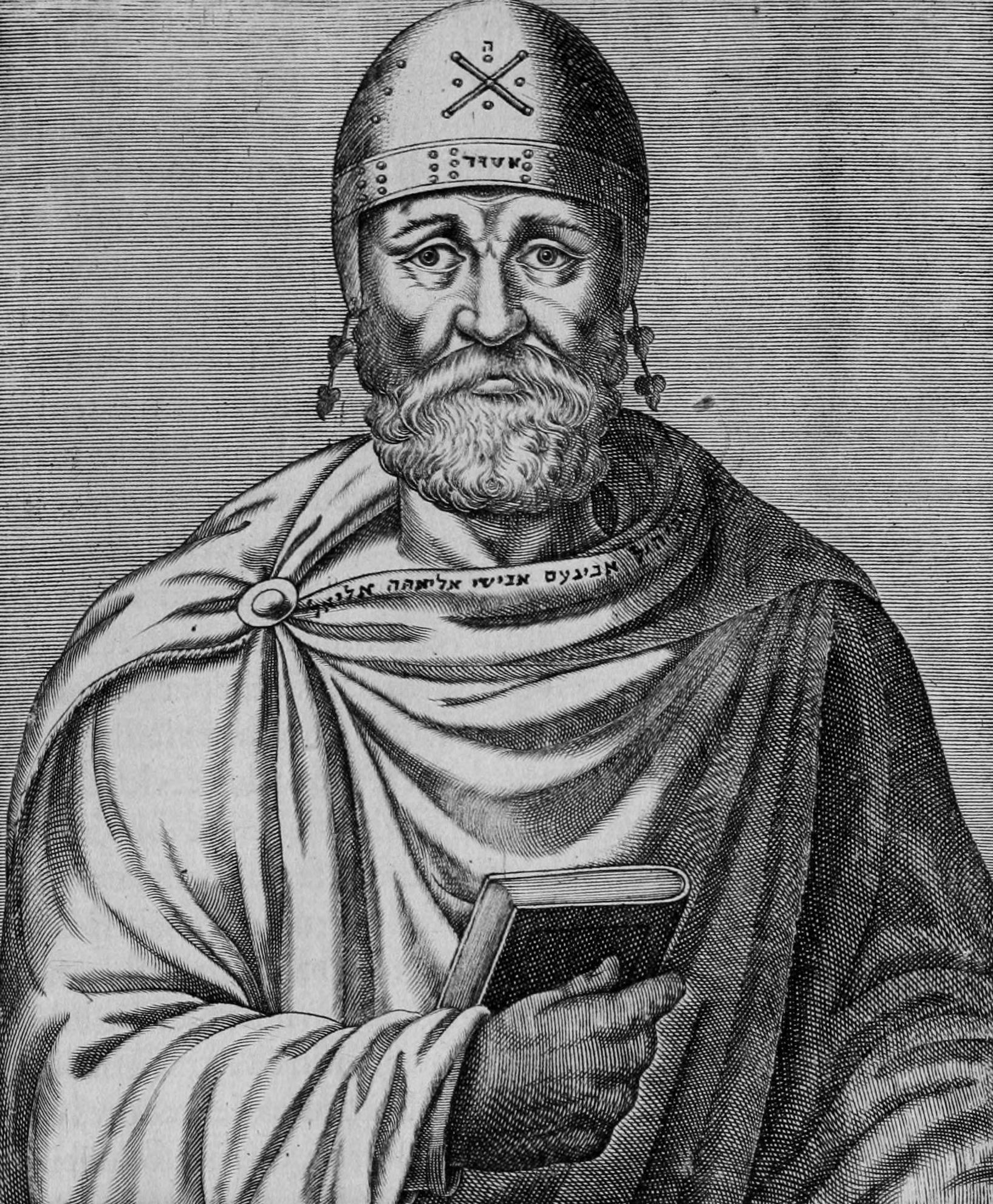
Philo

Central to Philo's thought was the concept of the Logos, a divine intermediary between God and the world, through which he explained creation, providence, and human access to the divine. In his ethical philosophy, Philo interpreted the patriarchs as moral archetypes: Abraham as faith guided by reason, Joseph as the model of a wise and just statesman, and Moses as the ideal leader combining the roles of legislator, priest, and prophet. He envisioned the soul's ascent to God through the cultivation of virtue, contemplation, and the rejection of passions.

=== Book of Sirach ===
The Book of Sirach, also known as Ecclesiasticus or The Wisdom of Jesus ben Sira, was originally composed in Hebrew in the early 2nd century BCE by Ben Sira in Jerusalem. It is a major example of early Jewish wisdom literature from the Hellenistic period. Rooted in Israel's wisdom tradition, Sirach offers a developed ethical framework for a Jewish population living under foreign influence. Its central concept is the fear of the Lord, described as the foundation of wisdom (1:14). This fear manifests in practical ethics: trust, humility, obedience to commandments, and respect for parents and teachers. Wisdom is cultivated through moral discipline, social responsibility, and study of the Law, aimed at aligning life with divine order.

Ben Sira closely associates Wisdom with the Torah, presenting the study of the Law as both spiritual practice and intellectual pursuit. This approach recalls Stoic ideals of living in accordance with reason and nature, in a way situated within ancient Israel's covenantal tradition. The figure of the scribe emerges as a teacher and sage, devoted to sacred texts and based in a house of study (beth midrash, 51:23).

Sirach advocates a this-worldly ethics. It avoids speculation about afterlife, resurrection, or messianic redemption, focusing instead on earthly reward for virtue and the shaping of character through moral choice and tradition. In this respect, the book differs from apocalyptic writings of the Second Temple period. Philosophically, the book is practical rather than speculative. It uses mashal (proverbs), extended moral reflections, hymns, and praises of creation and wisdom. While heavily reliant on biblical texts, especially Proverbs and Psalms, it also shows influence from Hellenistic sources, including the Wisdom of Ahikar.

== Jewish scholarship after destruction of Second Temple ==
With the Roman destruction of the Second Temple in 70 CE, Second Temple Judaism was in disarray. Still, Jewish traditions were preserved especially thanks to the shrewd maneuvers of Johanan ben Zakai, who saved the Sanhedrin and moved it to Yavne. Philosophical speculation was not a central part of Rabbinic Judaism, but some have seen the Mishnah as a philosophical work. Rabbi Akiva has also been viewed as a philosopher figure. He is credited with the following teachings in the Mishnah:

- "How favored is man, for he was created in the image [of God]."
- "All things are foreseen [by God], yet the freedom to choose is given [unto man], and the world is judged on [its] merits, while everything is according to the preponderance of [good or bad] works."

After the Bar Kokhba revolt, rabbinic scholars gathered in Tiberias and Safed to re-assemble and re-assess Judaism, its laws, theology, liturgy, beliefs, and leadership structure. In 219 CE, the Sura Academy (from which Jewish Kalam emerged many centuries later) was founded by Abba Arika. For the next five centuries, Talmudic academies focused on reconstituting Judaism, and little, if any, philosophic investigation was pursued.

=== Who influences whom? ===
Rabbinic Judaism had limited philosophical activity until it was challenged by Islam, Karaite Judaism, and Christianity—with Tanakh, Mishnah, and Talmud, there was previously no explicit requirement for a philosophic framework. From an economic viewpoint, Radhanite trade dominance was being usurped by coordinated Christian and Islamic forced conversions and torture, compelling Jewish scholars to apprehend nascent economic threats. These investigations yielded intellectual exchange between Jewish and Islamic scholars in jurisprudence, mathematics, astronomy, logic, and philosophy. Jewish scholars influenced Islamic scholars, and Islamic scholars influenced Jewish scholars. Contemporary scholars continue to debate who was Muslim and who was Jewish—some "Islamic scholars" were Jewish scholars prior to forced conversion to Islam, and there were episodic willing conversions of Jewish scholars to Islam (such as Abdullah ibn Salam). In contrast, others later reverted to Judaism, and still others, born and raised as Jews, were ambiguous in their public religious beliefs, such as ibn al-Rawandi. However, they lived according to the customs of their Muslim neighbors.

Around 700 CE, ʿAmr ibn ʿUbayd Abu ʿUthman al-Basri introduced two streams of thought that influenced Jewish, Islamic, and Christian scholars:

1. Qadariyah
2. Bahshamiyya Muʿtazila

The story of the Bahshamiyya Muʿtazila and Qadariyah is as important, if not more so, as the intellectual symbiosis of Judaism and Islam in Islamic Spain.

Around 733 CE, Mar Natronai ben Habibai moved to Kairouan, then to Spain, transcribing the Talmud Bavli for the academy at Kairouan from memory—later taking a copy with him to Spain.

==== Karaism ====
Borrowing from the Mutakallamin of Basra, the Karaites were the first Jewish group to subject Judaism to Muʿtazila. Rejecting the Talmud and Rabbinical tradition, Karaites took radical liberty to reinterpret the Tanakh. This meant abandoning foundational Jewish belief structures. Some scholars suggest that the major impetus for the formation of Karaism was a reaction to the rapid rise of Shia Islam, which recognized Judaism as a fellow monotheistic faith but claimed it detracted from monotheism by deferring to rabbinic authority. Karaites absorbed certain aspects of Jewish sects such as the followers of Abu Isa, Maliki (Sunnis), and Yudghanites, who were influenced by East-Islamic scholarship yet deferred to the Ash'ari when contemplating the sciences.

==== Philosophic synthesis begins ====
Asuristan (shown: modern Iraq), also called Babylonia: Centers of Ancient Jewish scholarship

The spread of Islam throughout the Middle East and North Africa rendered Islamic much that was previously Jewish. Greek philosophy, science, medicine, and mathematics were absorbed by Jewish scholars living in the Arab world due to Arabic translations of those texts in remnants of the Library of Alexandria. Early Jewish converts to Islam brought with them stories from Jewish tradition, known as Isra'iliyyat, which told of the Banu Isra'il: the pious men of ancient Israel. One of the most famous early mystics of Sufism, Hasan of Basra, introduced numerous Isra'iliyyat into Islamic scholarship—stories that went on to become representative of Islamic mystical ideas of the piety of Sufism.

Hai Gaon of Pumbedita Academy began a new phase in Jewish scholarship and investigation (hakirah); Hai Gaon augments Talmudic scholarship with non-Jewish studies. Hai Gaon was a savant with an exact knowledge of the theological movements of his time, so much so that Moses ibn Ezra called him a mutakallim. Hai was competent in arguing with followers of Qadariyyah and Mutazilites, sometimes adopting their polemic methods. Through correspondence with the Talmudic academies of Kairouan, Cordoba, and Lucena, Hai Gaon transmitted his scholarly findings, which influenced the scholars at those centers.

The teachings of the Brethren of Purity were carried to the West by the Cordovan hadith scholar and alchemist Maslama al-Qurtubi (died 964), where they would be of central importance to the Jewish philosophers of Islamic Spain. One of the themes emphasized by the Brethren of Purity and adopted by most Spanish Jewish philosophers is the microcosm-macrocosm analogy. From the 10th century on, Spain became a center of philosophical learning as is reflected by the explosion of philosophical inquiry among Jews, Muslims and Christians.

== Jewish philosophy before Maimonides ==
=== "Hiwi the Heretic" ===
According to Sa'adya Gaon, the Jewish community of Balkh (Afghanistan) was divided into two groups: "Jews" and "people that are called Jews"; Hiwi al-Balkhi was a member of the latter. Hiwi is generally considered to be the very first "Jewish" philosopher to subject the Pentateuch to critical analysis. Hiwi is viewed by some scholars as an intellectually conflicted man torn between Judaism, Zoroastrianism, Gnostic Christianity, and Manichaean thought.

Hiwi espoused the belief that miraculous acts, described in the Pentateuch, are simply examples of people using their skills of reasoning to undertake, and perform, seemingly miraculous acts. As examples of this position, he argued that the parting of the Red Sea was a natural phenomenon, and that Moses' claim to greatness lay merely in his ability to calculate the right moment for the crossing. He also emphasized that the Egyptian magicians were able to reproduce several of Moses' "miracles," proving that they could not have been so unique. According to scholars, Hiwi's gravest mistake was having the Pentateuch redacted to reflect his own views - then had those redacted texts, which became popular, distributed to children. Since his views contradicted the views of both Rabbanite and Karaite scholars, Hiwi was declared a heretic. In this context, however, we can also regard Hiwi, while flawed, as the very first critical biblical commentator; zealous rationalistic views of Hiwi parallel those of Ibn al-Rawandi.

Saʿadya Gaon dedicated an entire treatise, written in rhyming Hebrew, to a refutation of Ḥīwī's arguments, two fragments of which, preserved in the Cairo Geniza, have been published (Davidson, 1915; Schirmann, 1965). Ḥīwī's criticisms are also noted in Abraham ibn Ezra's commentary on the Pentateuch. Sa'adya Gaon denounced Hiwi as an extreme rationalist, a "Mulhidun", or atheist/deviator. Abraham Ibn Daud described HIwi as a sectarian who "denied the Torah, yet used it to formulate a new Torah of his liking".

=== Sa'adya Gaon ===
"Saadia Gaon, son of a proselyte, is considered the greatest early Jewish philosopher after Solomon. During his early years in Tulunid Egypt, the Fatimid Caliphate ruled Egypt; the leaders of the Tulunids were Ismaili Imams. Their influence upon the Jewish academies of Egypt resonate in the works of Sa'adya. Sa'adya's Emunoth ve-Deoth ("Beliefs and Opinions") was originally called Kitab al-Amanat wal-l'tikadat ("Book of the Articles of Faith and Doctrines of Dogma"); it was the first systematic presentation and philosophic foundation of the dogmas of Judaism, completed at Sura Academy in 933 CE."

Little known is that Saadia traveled to Tiberias in 915CE to study with Abū 'l-Kathīr Yaḥyā ibn Zakariyyāʾ, "a Jewish theologian and Bible translator. He is not mentioned in any Jewish source, and apart from the Andalusian heresiographer and polemicist Ibn Hazm, who mentions him as a Jewish mutakallim (rational theologian), our main source of information is the Kitāb al-Tanbīh by the Muslim historian al-Masʿūdī (d. 956). In his brief survey of Arabic translations of the Bible, al-Masʿūdī states that the Israelites rely for exegesis and translation of the Hebrew books—i.e., the Torah, Prophets, and Psalms, twenty-four books in all, he says—on a number of Israelites whom they praise highly, almost all of whom he has met in person. He mentions Abū ʾl-Kathīr as one of them, and also Saadia ("Saʿīd ibn Yaʿqūb al-Fayyūmī"). Regardless of what we do not know, Saadia traveled to Tiberias (home of the learned scribes and exegetes) to learn and he chose Abū 'l-Kathīr Yaḥyā ibn Zakariyyāʾ al-Katib al-Tabariya. The extent of Abū ʾl-Kathīr's influence on Saadia's thought cannot be established, however."

Abū ʾl-Kathīr's profession is also unclear. al-Masʿūdī calls him a kātib, which has been variously interpreted as secretary, government official, (biblical) scribe, Masorete, and book copyist. For lack of further information, some scholars have tried to identify Abū ʾl-Kathīr with the Hebrew grammarian Abū ʿAlī Judah ben ʿAllān, likewise of Tiberias, who seems to have been a Karaite Jew. However, al-Masūdī unequivocally describes Abu ʾl-Kathīr (as well as his student Saadia) as an ashmaʿthī (Rabbanite).

In "Book of the Articles of Faith and Doctrines of Dogma" Saadia declares the rationality of the Jewish religion with the caveat that reason must capitulate wherever it contradicts tradition. Dogma takes precedence over reason. Saadia closely followed the rules of the Muʿtazila school of Abu Ali al-Jubba'i in composing his works. It was Saadia who laid foundations for Jewish rationalist theology which built upon the work of the Muʿtazila, thereby shifting Rabbinic Judaism from mythical explanations of the rabbis to reasoned explanations of the intellect. Saadia advanced the criticisms of Muʿtazila by Ibn al-Rawandi.

=== David ibn Merwan al-Mukkamas ===
Rakka in modern Syria

David ibn Merwan al-Mukkamas was author of the earliest known Jewish philosophical work of the Middle Ages, a commentary on the Sefer Yetzirah; he is regarded as the father of Jewish medieval philosophy. Al-Mukkamas was first to introduce the methods of Kalam into Judaism and the first Jew to mention Aristotle in his writings. He was a proselyte of Rabbinic Judaism (not Karaite Judaism, as some argue); al-Mukkamas was a student of physician, and renowned Christian philosopher, Hana. His close interaction with Hana, and his familial affiliation with Islam gave al-Mukkamas a unique view of religious belief and theology.

In 1898 Abraham Harkavy discovered, in Imperial Library of St. Petersburg, fifteen of the twenty chapters of David's philosophical work entitled Ishrun Maḳalat (Twenty Chapters) of which 15 survive. One of the oldest surviving witnesses to early Kalām, it begins with epistemological investigations, turns to proofs of the creation of the world and the subsequent existence of a Creator, discusses the unity of the Creator (including the divine attributes), and concludes with theodicy (humanity and revelation) and a refutation of other religions (mostly lost).

In 915 CE, Sa'adya Gaon left for Palestine, where, according to al-Masʿūdī (Tanbīh, 113), he perfected his education at the feet of Abū 'l-Kathīr Yaḥyā ibn Zakariyyāʾ al-Katib al-Tabari (d. 320/932). The latter is also mentioned by Ibn Ḥazm in his K. al-Fiṣlal wa 'l-niḥal, iii, 171, as being, together with Dāwūd ibn Marwān al-Muqammiṣ and Sa'adya himself, one of the mutakallimūn of the Jews.

Since al-Muqammiṣ made few references to specifically Jewish issues and very little of his work was translated from Arabic into Hebrew, he was largely forgotten by Jewish tradition. Nonetheless, he had a significant impact on subsequent Jewish philosophical followers of the Kalām, such as Saʿadya Gaon.

Mérida and Cordoba in modern Spain

=== Samuel ibn Naghrillah ===
Samuel ibn Naghrillah, born in Mérida, Spain, lived in Córdoba and was a child prodigy and student of Hanoch ben Moshe. Samuel ibn Naghrillah, Hasdai ibn Shaprut, and Moshe ben Hanoch founded the Lucena Yeshiva that produced such brilliant scholars as Isaac ibn Ghiyyat and Maimon ben Yosef, the father of Maimonides. Ibn Naghrillah's son, Yosef, provided refuge for two sons of Hezekiah Gaon; Daud Ibn Chizkiya Gaon Ha-Nasi and Yitzhak Ibn Chizkiya Gaon Ha-Nasi. Though not a philosopher, he did build the infrastructure to allow philosophers to thrive. In 1070 the gaon Isaac ben Moses ibn Sakri of Denia, Spain traveled to the East and acted as rosh yeshivah of the Baghdad Academy.

=== Solomon ibn Gabirol ===
Malaga & Valencia in modern Spain

Solomon ibn Gabirol was born in Málaga then moved to Valencia. Ibn Gabirol was one of the first teachers of Neoplatonism in Europe. His role has been compared to that of Philo. Ibn Gabirol occidentalized Greco-Arabic philosophy and restored it to Europe. The philosophical teachings of Philo and ibn Gabirol were largely ignored by fellow Jews; the parallel may be extended by adding that Philo and ibn Gabirol both exercised considerable influence in secular circles; Philo upon early Christianity and Ibn Gabirol upon the scholars of medieval Christianity. Christian scholars, including Albertus Magnus and Thomas Aquinas, defer to him frequently.

=== Abraham bar-Hiyya Ha-Nasi ===
bar-Hiyya-Barcelona then Arles

Abraham bar Hiyya, of Barcelona and later Arles-Provence, was a student of his father Hiyya al-Daudi and one of the most important figures in the scientific movement which made the Jews of Provence, Spain and Italy the intermediaries between Averroism, Muʿtazila and Christian Europe. He aided this scientific movement by original works, translations and as interpreter for another translator, Plato Tiburtinus. Bar-Hiyya's best student was v. His philosophical works are "Meditation of the Soul", an ethical work written from a rationalistic religious viewpoint, and an apologetic epistle addressed to Judah ben Barzillai.

=== Hibat Allah ===
Originally known by his Hebrew name Nethanel Baruch ben Melech al-Balad, Abu'l-Barakāt al-Baghdādī, known as Hibat Allah, was a Jewish philosopher and physicist and father-in-law of Maimonides who converted to Islam in his twilight years - once head of the Baghdad Yeshiva and considered the leading philosopher of Iraq.

Historians differ over the motive for his conversion to Islam. Some suggest it was a reaction to a social slight inflicted upon him because he was a Jew, while others suggest he was forcibly converted at the edge of a sword (which prompted Maimonides to comment upon Anusim). Despite his conversion to Islam, his works continued to be studied at the Jewish Baghdad Academy, a well-known academy, into the thirteenth century. He was a follower of Avicenna's teaching, who proposed an explanation of the acceleration of falling bodies by the accumulation of successive increments of power with successive increments of velocity.

His writings include Kitāb al-Muʿtabar ("The Book of What Has Been Established by Personal Reflection"); a philosophical commentary on the Kohelet, written in Arabic using Hebrew aleph bet; and the treatise "On the Reason Why the Stars Are Visible at Night and Hidden in Daytime." According to Hibat Allah, Kitāb al-Muʿtabar consists in the main of critical remarks jotted down by him over the years while reading philosophical text, and published at the insistence of his friends, in the form of a philosophical work.

=== Nethan'el al-Fayyumi ===
Sanaa in Modern Yemen

Natan'el al-Fayyumi of Yemen, was the twelfth-century author of Bustan al-Uqul ("Garden of Intellects"), a Jewish version of Ismaili Shi'i doctrines. Like the Ismailis, Natan'el al-Fayyumi argued that God sent different prophets to various nations of the world, containing legislations suited to the particular temperament of each individual nation. Ismaili doctrine holds that a single universal religious truth lies at the root of the different religions. Some Jews accepted this model of religious pluralism, leading them to view Muhammad as a legitimate prophet, though not Jewish, sent to preach to the Arabs, just as the Hebrew prophets had been sent to deliver their messages to Israel; others refused this notion in entirety.

=== Bahya ben Joseph ibn Paquda ===
Zaragoza in modern Spain

Bahye ben Yosef Ibn Paquda, of Zaragoza, was author of the first Jewish system of ethics Al Hidayah ila Faraid al-hulub, ("Guide to the Duties of the Heart"). Bahya often followed the method of the Arabian encyclopedists known as "the Brethren of Purity" but adopts some of Sufi tenets rather than Ismaili. According to Bahya, the Torah appeals to reason and knowledge as proofs of God's existence. It is therefore a duty incumbent upon every one to make God an object of speculative reason and knowledge, in order to arrive at true faith. Baḥya borrows from Sufism and Jewish Kalam integrating them into Neoplatonism. Proof that Bahya borrowed from Sufism is underscored by the fact that the title of his eighth gate, Muḥasabat al-Nafs ("Self-Examination"), is reminiscent of the Sufi Abu Abd Allah Ḥarith Ibn-Asad, who has been surnamed El Muḥasib ("the self-examiner"), because—say his biographers—"he was always immersed in introspection"

=== Yehuda Ha-Levi and the Kuzari ===
Toledo in modern Spain

Judah Halevi of Toledo, Spain defended Rabbinic Judaism against Islam, Christianity and Karaite Judaism. He was a student of Moses ibn Ezra whose education came from Isaac ibn Ghiyyat; trained as a Rationalist, he shed it in favor of Neoplatonism. Like al-Ghazali, Judah Halevi attempted to liberate religion from the bondage of philosophical systems. In particular, in a work written in Arabic Kitab al-Ḥujjah wal-Dalil fi Nuṣr al-Din al-Dhalil, translated by Judah ben Saul ibn Tibbon, by the title Kuzari he elaborates upon his views of Judaism relative to other religions of the time.

Almoravid Córdoba

=== Abraham ibn Daud ===
Almohad Córdoba

Abraham ibn Daud was a student of Rabbi Baruch ben Yitzhak Ibn Albalia, his maternal uncle. Ibn Daud's philosophical work written in Arabic, Al-'akidah al-Rafiyah ("The Sublime Faith"), has been preserved in Hebrew by the title Emunah Ramah. Ibn Daud did not introduce a new philosophy, but he was the first to introduce a more thorough systematic form derived from Aristotle. Accordingly, Hasdai Crescas mentions Ibn Daud as the only Jewish philosopher among the predecessors of Maimonides. Overshadowed by Maimonides, ibn Daud's Emunah Ramah, a work to which Maimonides was indebted, received little notice from later philosophers. "True philosophy", according to Ibn Daud, "does not entice us from religion; it tends rather to strengthen and solidify it. Moreover, it is the duty of every thinking Jew to become acquainted with the harmony existing between the fundamental doctrines of Judaism and those of philosophy, and, wherever they seem to contradict one another, to seek a mode of reconciling them".

Fez in Morocco

=== Other notable Jewish philosophers pre-Maimonides ===
- Abraham ibn Ezra
- Isaac ibn Ghiyyat
- Moses ibn Ezra
- Yehuda Alharizi
- Joseph ibn Tzaddik
- Samuel ibn Tibbon

== Maimonides ==
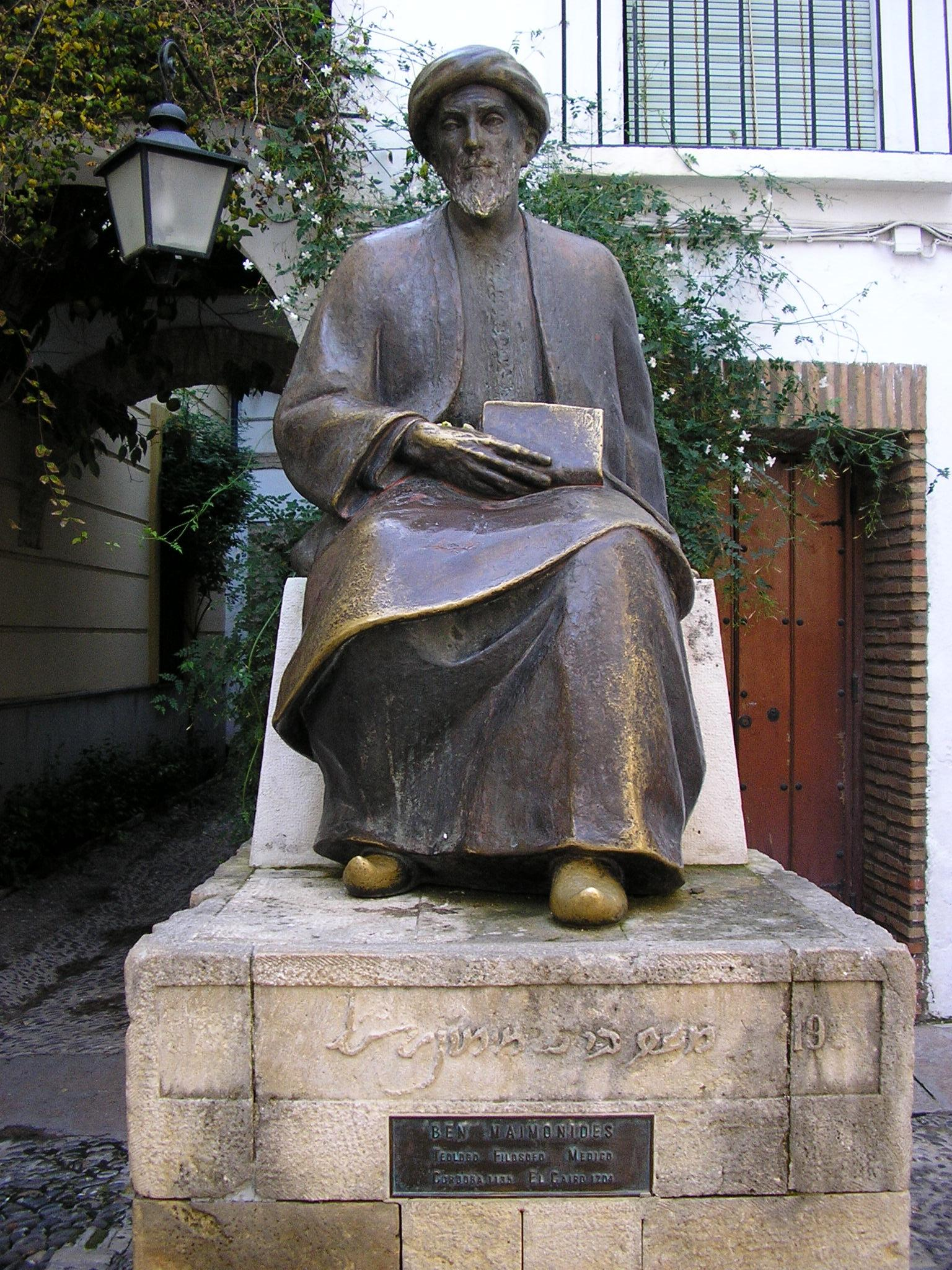
Artist's depiction, sculpture of Maimonides

Abbasid Fostat

Maimonides wrote The Guide for the Perplexed — his most influential philosophic work. He was a student of his father, Rabbi Maimon ben Yosef (a student of Joseph ibn Migash) in Cordoba, Spain. When his family fled Spain, for Fez, Maimonides enrolled in the Academy of Fez and studied under Rabbi Yehuda Ha-Kohen Ibn Soussan — a student of Isaac Alfasi. Maimonides strove to reconcile Aristotelian philosophy and science with the teachings of Torah. In some ways his position was parallel to that of Averroes; in reaction to the attacks on Avicennian Aristotelism, Maimonides embraced and defended a stricter Aristotelism without Neoplatonic additions. The principles which inspired all of Maimonides' philosophical activity was identical those of Abraham Ibn Daud: there can be no contradiction between the truths which God has revealed and the findings of the human intellect in science and philosophy. Maimonides departed from the teachings of Aristotle by suggesting that the world is not eternal, as Aristotle taught, but was created ex nihilo. In "Guide for the Perplexed" (1:17 & 2:11)" Maimonides explains that Israel lost its Mesorah in exile, and with it "we lost our science and philosophy — only to be rejuvenated in Al Andalus within the context of interaction and intellectual investigation of Jewish, Christian and Muslim texts.

== Medieval Jewish philosophy after Maimonides ==
Maimonides writings almost immediately came under attack from Karaites, Dominican Christians, Tosafists of Provence, Ashkenaz and Al Andalus. Scholars suggest that Maimonides instigated the Maimonidean Controversy when he verbally attacked Samuel ben Ali ("Gaon of Baghdad") as "one whom people accustom from his youth to believe that there is none like him in his generation," and he sharply attacked the "monetary demands" of the academies. Samuel ben Ali was an anti-Maimonidean operating in Babylon to undermine the works of Maimonides and those of Maimonides' patrons (the Al-Constantini family from North Africa). To illustrate the reach of the Maimonidean Controversy, Samuel ben Ali, the chief opponent of Maimonides in the East, was excommunicated by Daud Ibn Hodaya al Daudi (Exilarch of Mosul). Maimonides' attacks on Samuel ben Ali may not have been entirely altruistic given the position of Maimonides' in-laws in competing Yeshivas.

In Western Europe, the controversy was halted by the burning of Maimonides' works by Christian Dominicans in 1232. Avraham son of Rambam, continued fighting for his father's beliefs in the East; desecration of Maimonides' tomb, at Tiberias by Jews, was a profound shock to Jews throughout the Diaspora and caused all to pause and reflect upon what was being done to the fabric of Jewish culture. This compelled many anti-Maimonideans to recant their assertions and realize what cooperation with Christians meant to them, their texts and their communities.

Maimonidean controversy flared up again at the beginning of the fourteenth century when Rabbi Shlomo ben Aderet, under influence from Asher ben Jehiel, issued a cherem on "any member of the community who, being under twenty-five years, shall study the works of the Greeks on natural science and metaphysics."

Contemporary Kabbalists, Tosafists and Rationalists continue to engage in lively, sometimes caustic, debate in support of their positions and influence in the Jewish world. At the center of many of these debates are "Guide for the Perplexed", "13 Principles of Faith", "Mishnah Torah", and his commentary on Anusim.

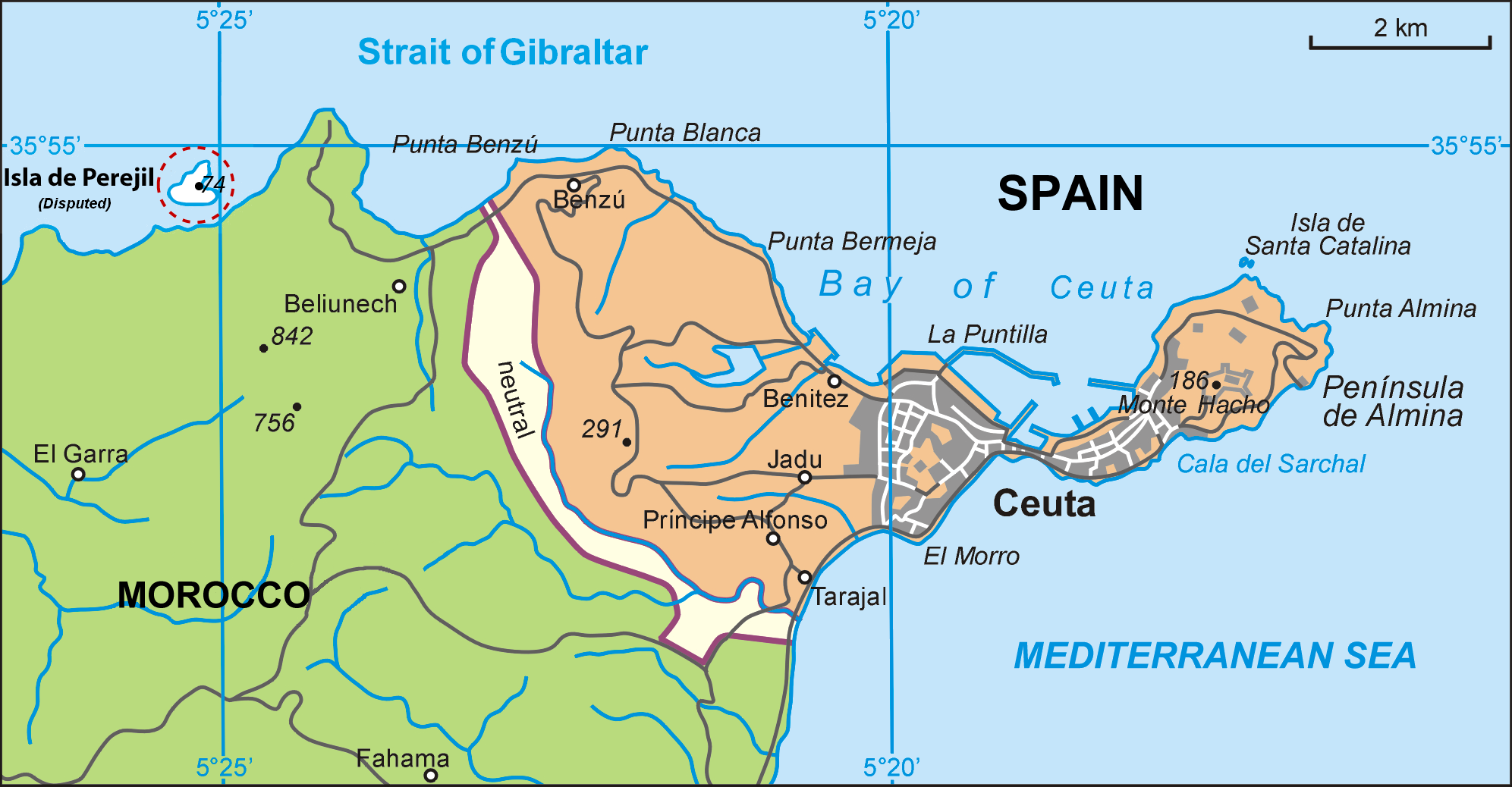
Ceuta, North African Spain

=== Yosef ben Yehuda of Ceuta ===
Aleppo in modern Syria

Joseph ben Judah of Ceuta was the son of Rabbi Yehuda Ha-Kohen Ibn Soussan and a student of Maimonides for whom the Guide for the Perplexed is written. Yosef traveled from Alexandria to Fustat to study logic, mathematics, and astronomy under Maimonides. Philosophically, Yosef's dissertation, in Arabic, on the problem of "Creation" is suspected to have been written before contact with Maimonides. It is entitled Ma'amar bimehuyav ha-metsiut ve'eykhut sidur ha-devarim mimenu vehidush ha'olam ("A Treatise as to (1) Necessary Existence (2) The Procedure of Things from the Necessary Existence and (3) The Creation of the World").

=== Jacob Anatoli ===
Jacob Anatoli is generally regarded as a pioneer in the application of the Maimonidean Rationalism to the study of Jewish texts. He was the son-in-law of Samuel ibn Tibbon, translator of Maimonides. Due to these family ties Anatoli was introduced to the philosophy of Maimonides, the study of which was such a great revelation to him that he, in later days, referred to it as the beginning of his intelligent and true comprehension of the Scriptures, while he frequently alluded to Ibn Tibbon as one of the two masters who had instructed and inspired him. Anatoli wrote the Malmad exhibiting his broad knowledge of classic Jewish exegetes, as well as Plato, Aristotle, Averroes, and the Vulgate, as well as with a large number of Christian institutions, some of which he ventures to criticize, such as celibacy and monastic castigation, as well as certain heretics and he repeatedly appeals to his readers for a broader cultivation of the classic languages and the non-Jewish branches of learning. To Anatoli, all men are formed in the image of God, although the Jews stand under a particular obligation to further the true cognition of God simply by reason of their election, "the Greeks had chosen wisdom as their pursuit; the Romans, power; and the Jews, religiousness"

=== Hillel ben Samuel ===
Firstly, Hillel ben Samuel's importance in the history of medieval Jewish philosophy lies in his attempt to deal, systematically, with the question of the immortality of the soul. Secondly, Hillel played a major role in the controversies of 1289–90 concerning the philosophical works of Maimonides. Thirdly, Hillel was the first devotee of Jewish learning and Philosophy in Italy, bringing a close to a period of relative ignorance of Hakira in Verona (Italy). And finally, Hillel is one of the early Latin translators of "the wise men of the nations" (non-Jewish scholars).

Defending Maimonides, Hillel addressed a letter to his friend Maestro Gaio asking him to use his influence with the Jews of Rome against Maimonides' opponents (Solomon Petit). He also advanced the bold idea of gathering together Maimonides' defenders and opponents in Alexandria, in order to bring the controversy before a court of Babylonian rabbis, whose decision would be binding on both factions. Hillel was certain the verdict would favor Maimonides.

Hillel wrote a commentary on the 25 propositions appearing at the beginning of the second part of the Guide of the Perplexed, and three philosophical treatises, which were appended to Tagmulei ha-Nefesh: the first on knowledge and free will; the second on the question of why mortality resulted from the sin of Adam; the third on whether or not the belief in the fallen angels is a true belief.

=== Shemtob Ben Joseph Ibn Falaquera ===
Narbonne in modern France

Shem-Tov ibn Falaquera was a Spanish-born philosopher who pursued reconciliation between Jewish dogma and philosophy. Scholars speculate he was a student of Rabbi David Kimhi whose family fled Spain to Narbonne. Ibn Falaquera lived an ascetic live of solitude. Ibn Falaquera's two leading philosophic authorities were Averroes and Maimonides. Ibn Falaquera defended the "Guide for the Perplexed" against attacks of anti-Maimonideans. He knew the works of the Islamic philosophers better than any Jewish scholar of his time, and made many of them available to other Jewish scholars – often without attribution (Reshit Hokhmah). Ibn Falaquera did not hesitate to modify Islamic philosophic texts when it suited his purposes. For example, Ibn Falaquera turned Alfarabi's account of the origin of philosophic religion into a discussion of the origin of the "virtuous city". Ibn Falaquera's other works include, but are not limited to Iggeret Hanhagat ha-Guf we ha-Nefesh, a treatise in verse on the control of the body and the soul.

- Iggeret ha-Wikkuaḥ, a dialogue between a religious Jew and a Jewish philosopher on the harmony of philosophy and religion.
- Reshit Ḥokmah, treating of moral duties, of the sciences, and of the necessity of studying philosophy.
- Sefer ha-Ma'alot, on different degrees of human perfection.
- Moreh ha-Moreh, commentary on the philosophical part of Maimonides' "Guide for the Perplexed".

=== Joseph ben Abba Mari ibn Kaspi ===
Ibn Kaspi was a fierce advocate of Maimonides to such an extent that he left for Egypt in 1314 in order to hear explanations on the Guide of the Perplexed from Maimonides' grandchildren. When he heard that the Guide of the Perplexed was being studied in the Muslim philosophical schools of Fez, he left for that town (in 1332) in order to observe their method of study.

Ibn Kaspi began writing when he was 17 years old on topics which included logic, linguistics, ethics, theology, biblical exegesis, and super-commentaries to Abraham Ibn Ezra and Maimonides. Philosophic systems he followed were Aristotle's and Averroes'. He defines his aim as "not to be a fool who believes in everything, but only in that which can be verified by proof...and not to be of the second unthinking category which disbelieves from the start of its inquiry," since "certain things must be accepted by tradition, because they cannot be proven." Scholars continue to debate whether ibn Kaspi was a heretic or one of Judaisms most illustrious scholars.

=== Gersonides ===
Bagnols in Modern France

Rabbi Levi ben Gershon was a student of his father Gerson ben Solomon of Arles, who in turn was a student of Shem-Tov ibn Falaquera. Gersonides is best known for his work Milhamot HaShem ("Wars of the Lord"). Milhamot HaShem is modelled after the "Guide for the Perplexed". Gersonides and his father were avid students of the works of Alexander of Aphrodisias, Aristotle, Empedocles, Galen, Hippocrates, Homer, Plato, Ptolemy, Pythagoras, Themistius, Theophrastus, Ali ibn Abbas al-Magusi, Ali ibn Ridwan, Averroes, Avicenna, Qusta ibn Luqa, Al-Farabi, Al-Fergani, Chonain, Isaac Israeli, Ibn Tufail, Ibn Zuhr, Isaac Alfasi, and Maimonides. Gersonides held that God does not have complete foreknowledge of human acts. "Gersonides, bothered by the old question of how God's foreknowledge is compatible with human freedom, suggests that what God knows beforehand is all the choices open to each individual. God does not know, however, which choice the individual, in his freedom, will make."

=== Moses Narboni ===
Perpignan in modern France

Moses ben Joshua composed commentaries on Islamic philosophical works. As an admirer of Averroes, he devoted a great deal of study to his works and wrote commentaries on a number of them. His best-known work is his Shelemut ha-Nefesh ("Treatise on the Perfection of the Soul"). Moses began studying philosophy with his father when he was thirteen, later studying with Moses ben David Caslari and Abraham ben David Caslari - both of whom were students of Kalonymus ben Kalonymus. Moses believed that Judaism was a guide to the highest degree of theoretical and moral truth. He believed that the Torah had both a simple, direct meaning accessible to the average reader as well as a deeper, metaphysical meaning accessible to thinkers. Moses rejected the belief in miracles, instead believing they could be explained, and defended man's free will by philosophical arguments.

=== Isaac ben Sheshet Perfet ===
Barcelona and Valencia in modern Spain
Algiers in modern Algeria

Isaac ben Sheshet Perfet, of Barcelona, studied under Hasdai Crescas and Rabbi Nissim ben Reuben Gerondi. Nissim ben Reuben Gerondi was a steadfast Rationalist who did not hesitate to refute leading authorities, such as Rashi, Rabbeinu Tam, Moses ben Nahman, and Solomon ben Adret. The pogroms of 1391, against Jews of Spain, forced Isaac to flee to Algiers - where he lived out his life. Isaac's responsa evidence a profound knowledge of the philosophical writings of his time; in one of Responsa No. 118 he explains the difference between the opinion of Gersonides and that of Abraham ben David of Posquières on free will, and gives his own views on the subject. He was an adversary of Kabbalah who never spoke of the Sefirot; he quotes another philosopher when reproaching kabbalists with "believing in the "Ten" (Sefirot) as the Christians believe in the Trinity".

=== Hasdai ben Abraham Crescas ===
Barcelona in modern Spain

Hasdai Crescas, of Barcelona, was a leading rationalist on issues of natural law and free-will. His views can be seen as precursors to Baruch Spinoza's. His work, Or Adonai, became a classic refutation of medieval Aristotelianism, and harbinger of the scientific revolution in the 16th century. Hasdai Crescas was a student of Nissim ben Reuben Gerondi, who in turn was a student of Reuben ben Nissim Gerondi. Crescas was a rabbi and the head of the Jewish community of Aragon, and in some ways of all Hispanic Jewry, during one of its most critical periods. Among his fellow students and friends, his best friend was Isaac ben Sheshet Perfet. Crescas' students won accolades as participants in the Disputation of Tortosa.

=== Simeon ben Zemah Duran ===
Influenced by the teaching of Rabbi Nissim of Gerona, via Ephraim Vidal's Yeshiva in Majorca, Duran's commentary Magen Avot ("The Shield of the Fathers"), which influenced Joseph Albo, is important. He was also a student of philosophy, astronomy, mathematics, and especially of medicine, which he practiced for a number of years at Palma, in Majorca. Magen Avot deals with concepts such as the nature of God, the eternity of the Torah, the coming of the Messiah, and the Resurrection of the dead. Duran believed that Judaism has three dogmas only: the existence of God, the Torah's Divine origin, and Reward and Punishment; in this regard he was followed by Joseph Albo.

=== Joseph Albo ===
Monreal in modern Spain

Joseph Albo, of Monreal, was a student of Hasdai Crescas. He wrote Sefer ha-Ikkarim ("Book of Principles"), a classic work on the fundamentals of Judaism. Albo narrows the fundamental Jewish principles of faith from thirteen to three -

- belief in the existence of God,
- belief in revelation, and
- belief in divine justice, as related to the idea of immortality.

Albo rejects the assumption that creation ex nihilo is essential in belief in God. Albo freely criticizes Maimonides' thirteen principles of belief and Crescas' six principles. According to Albo, "belief in the Messiah is only a 'twig' unnecessary to the soundness of the trunk"; not essential to Judaism. Nor is it true, according to Albo, that every law is binding. Although every ordinance has the power of conferring happiness in its observance, it is not true that every law must be observed, or that through the neglect of a part of the law, a Jew would violate the divine covenant or be damned. Contemporary Orthodox Jews, however, vehemently disagree with Albo's position believing that all Jews are divinely obligated to fulfill every applicable commandment.

=== Hoter ben Solomon ===
Sanaa in modern Yemen

Hoter ben Shlomo was a scholar and philosopher in Yemen heavily influenced by Nethanel ben al-Fayyumi, Maimonides, Saadia Gaon and al-Ghazali. The connection between the "Epistle of the Brethren of Purity" and Ismailism suggests the adoption of this work as one of the main sources of what would become known as "Jewish Ismailism" as found in Late Medieval Yemenite Judaism. "Jewish Ismailism" consisted of adapting, to Judaism, a few Ismaili doctrines about cosmology, prophecy, and hermeneutics. There are many examples of the Brethren of Purity influencing Yemenite Jewish philosophers and authors in the period 1150–1550. Some traces of Brethren of Purity doctrines, as well as of their numerology, are found in two Yemenite philosophical midrashim written in 1420–1430: Midrash ha-hefez ("Midrash of Desire") by Zechariah ha-Rofé (a.k.a. Yahya al-Tabib) and the Siraj al-'uqul ("Lamp of Intellects") by Hoter ben Solomon.

=== Don Isaac Abravanel ===
Lisbon in modern Portugal
Corfu in modern Greece

Isaac Abravanel, statesman, philosopher, Bible commentator, and financier who commented on Maimonides' thirteen principles in his Rosh Amanah. Isaac Abravanel was steeped in Rationalism by the Ibn Yahya family, who had a residence immediately adjacent to the Great Synagogue of Lisbon (also built by the Ibn Yahya Family). His most important work, Rosh Amanah ("The Pinnacle of Faith"), defends Maimonides' thirteen articles of belief against attacks of Hasdai Crescas and Yosef Albo. Rosh Amanah ends with the statement that "Maimonides compiled these articles merely in accordance with the fashion of other nations, which set up axioms or fundamental principles for their science".

Isaac Abravanel was born and raised in Lisbon; a student of the Rabbi of Lisbon, Yosef ben Shlomo Ibn Yahya. Rabbi Yosef was a poet, religious scholar, rebuilder of Ibn Yahya Synagogue of Calatayud, well versed in rabbinic literature and in the learning of his time, devoting his early years to the study of Jewish philosophy. The Ibn Yahya family were renowned physicians, philosophers and accomplished aides to the Portuguese Monarchy for centuries.

Padua and Verona in modern Italy

Isaac's grandfather, Samuel Abravanel, was forcibly converted to Christianity during the pogroms of 1391 and took the Spanish name "Juan Sanchez de Sevilla". Samuel fled Castile-León, Spain, in 1397 for Lisbon, Portugal, and reverted to Judaism - shedding his Converso after living among Christians for six years. Conversions outside Judaism, coerced or otherwise, had a strong impact upon young Isaac, later compelling him to forfeit his immense wealth in an attempt to redeem Iberian Jewry from coercion of the Alhambra Decree. There are parallels between what he writes, and documents produced by Inquisitors, that present conversos as ambivalent to Christianity and sometimes even ironic in their expressions regarding their new religion - crypto-jews.

=== Leone Ebreo ===
Judah Leon Abravanel was a Portuguese physician, poet and philosopher. His work Dialoghi d'amore ("Dialogues of Love"), written in Italian, was one of the most important philosophical works of his time. In an attempt to circumvent a plot hatched by local Catholic Bishops to kidnap his son, Judah sent his son from Castile to Portugal with a nurse, but by order of the king the son was seized and baptized. This was a devastating insult to Judah and his family, and was a source of bitterness throughout Judah's life and the topic of his writings years later; especially since this was not the first time the Abravanel Family was subjected to such embarrassment at the hands of the Catholic Church.

Judah's Dialoghi is regarded as the finest of Humanistic Period works. His neoplatonism is derived from the Hispanic Jewish community, especially the works of Ibn Gabirol. Platonic notions of reaching towards a nearly impossible ideal of beauty, wisdom, and perfection encompass the whole of his work. In Dialoghi d'amore, Judah defines love in philosophical terms. He structures his three dialogues as a conversation between two abstract "characters": Philo, representing love or appetite, and Sophia, representing science or wisdom, Philo+Sophia (philosophia).

=== Criticisms of Kabbalah ===
The word "Kabbalah" was used in medieval Jewish texts to mean "tradition", see Abraham Ibn Daud's Sefer Ha-Qabbalah also known as the "Book of our Tradition". "Book of our Tradition" does not refer to mysticism of any kind - it chronicles "our tradition of scholarship and study" in two Babylonian Academies, through the Geonim, into Talmudic Yeshivas of Spain. In Talmudic times there was a mystic tradition in Judaism, known as Maaseh Bereshith (the work of creation) and Maaseh Merkavah (the work of the chariot); Maimonides interprets these texts as referring to Aristotelian physics and metaphysics as interpreted in the light of Torah.

In the 13th century, however, a mystical-esoteric system emerged which became known as "the Kabbalah". Many of the beliefs associated with Kabbalah had long been rejected by philosophers. Saadia Gaon had taught in his book Emunot v'Deot that Jews who believe in gilgul have adopted a non-Jewish belief. Maimonides rejected many texts of Heichalot, particularly Shi'ur Qomah whose anthropomorphic vision of God he considered heretical.

In the 13th century, Meir ben Simon of Narbonne wrote an epistle (included in Milhhemet Mitzvah) against early Kabbalists, singled out Sefer Bahir, rejecting the attribution of its authorship to the tanna R. Nehhunya ben ha-Kanah and describing some of its content:

... And we have heard that a book had already been written for them, which they call Bahir, that is 'bright' but no light shines through it. This book has come into our hands and we have found that they falsely attribute it to Rabbi Nehunya ben Haqqanah. haShem forbid! There is no truth in this... The language of the book and its whole content show that it is the work of someone who lacked command of either literary language or good style, and in many passages it contains words which are out and out heresy.

=== Other notable Jewish philosophers post-Maimonides ===
- Jedaiah ben Abraham Bedersi
- Nissim of Gerona
- Jacob ben Machir ibn Tibbon
- Isaac Nathan ben Kalonymus
- Judah Messer Leon
- David ben Judah Messer Leon
- Obadiah ben Jacob Sforno
- Judah Moscato
- Azariah dei Rossi
- Isaac Aboab I
- Isaac Campanton a.k.a. "the gaon of Castile"
- Isaac ben Moses Arama
- Profiat Duran a Converso, Duran wrote Be Not Like Your Fathers

== Renaissance Jewish philosophy and philosophers ==
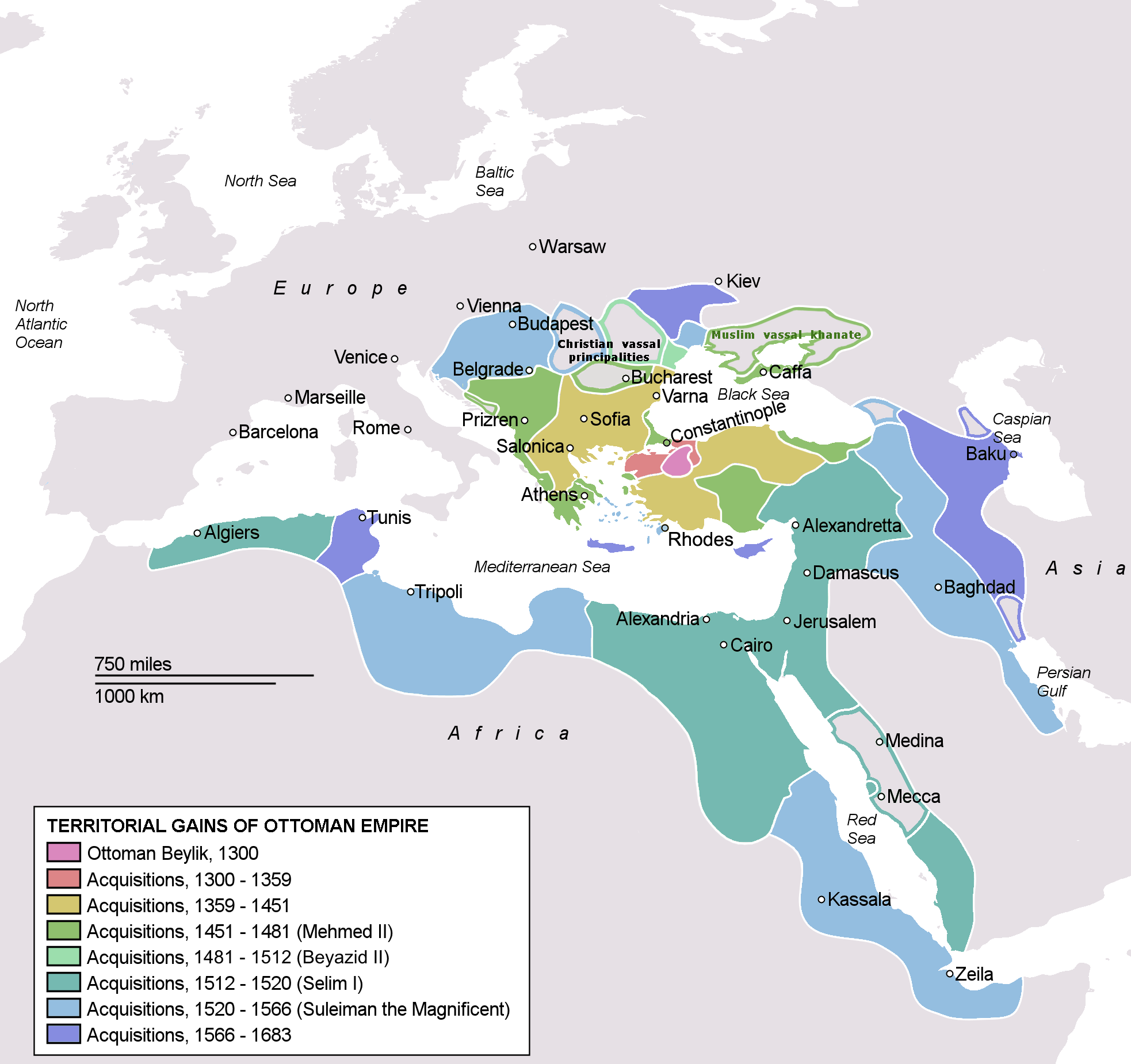
Ottoman Empire welcomed Jews expelled from Spain & Portugal

Some of the Monarchies of Asia Minor and European welcomed expelled Jewish Merchants, scholars and theologians. Divergent Jewish philosophies evolved against the backdrop of new cultures, new languages and renewed theological exchange. Philosophic exploration continued through the Renaissance period as the center-of-mass of Jewish Scholarship shifted to France, Germany, Italy, and Turkey.

=== Elias ben Moise del Medigo ===
Heraklion in modern Crete

Elia del Medigo was a descendant of Judah ben Eliezer ha-Levi Minz and Moses ben Isaac ha-Levi Minz. Eli'ezer del Medigo, of Rome, received the surname "Del Medigo" after studying medicine. The name was later changed from Del Medigo to Ha-rofeh. He was the father and teacher of a long line of rationalist philosophers and scholars. Non-Jewish students of Delmedigo classified him as an "Averroist", however, he saw himself as a follower of Maimonides. Scholastic association of Maimonides and Ibn Rushd would have been a natural one; Maimonides, towards the end of his life, was impressed with the Ibn Rushd commentaries and recommended them to his students. The followers of Maimonides (Maimonideans) had therefore been, for several generations before Delmedigo, the leading users, translators and disseminators of the works of Ibn Rushd in Jewish circles, and advocates for Ibn Rushd even after Islamic rejection of his radical views. Maimonideans regarded Maimonides and Ibn Rushd as following the same general line. In his book, Delmedigo portrays himself as defender of Maimonidean Judaism, and — like many Maimonideans — he emphasized the rationality of Jewish tradition.

Thessaloniki in modern Greece

=== Moses Almosnino ===
Moses Almosnino was born Thessaloniki 1515 - died Constantinople abt 1580. He was a student of Levi Ibn Habib, who was in turn a student of Jacob ibn Habib, who was, in turn, a student of Nissim ben Reuben. In 1570 he wrote a commentary on the Pentateuch titled "Yede Mosheh" (The Hands of Moses); also an exposition of the Talmudical treatise "Abot" (Ethics of the Fathers), published in Salonica in 1563; and a collection of sermons delivered upon various occasions, particularly funeral orations, entitled "Meammeẓ Koaḥ" (Re-enforcing Strength).

al-Ghazâlî's Intentions of the Philosophers (De'ôt ha-Fîlôsôfîm or Kavvanôt ha-Fîlôsôfîm) was one of the most widespread philosophical texts studied among Jews in Europe having been translated in 1292 by Isaac Albalag. Later Hebrew commentators include Moses Narboni, and Moses Almosnino.

Padua & Verona in modern Italy

=== Moses ben Jehiel Ha-Kohen Porto-Rafa (Rapaport) ===
Moses ben Jehiel Ha-Kohen Porto-Rafa (Rapaport), was a member of the German family "Rafa" (from whom the Delmedigo family originates) that settled in the town of Porto in the vicinity of Verona, Italy, and became the progenitors of the renowned Rapaport rabbinic family. In 1602 Moses served as rabbi of Badia Polesine in Piedmont. Moses was a friend of Leon Modena.

=== Abraham ben Judah ha-Levi Minz ===
Abraham ben Judah ha-Levi Minz was an Italian rabbi who flourished at Padua in the first half of the 16th century, father-in-law of Meïr Katzenellenbogen. Minz studied chiefly under his father, Judah Minz, whom he succeeded as rabbi and head of the yeshiva of Padua.

=== Meir ben Isaac Katzellenbogen ===
Location of Mainz in modern Germany
Location of Prague in modern Czech Republic

Meir ben Isaac Katzellenbogen was born in Prague where together with Shalom Shachna he studied under Jacob Pollak. Many rabbis, including Moses Isserles, addressed him in their responsa as the "av bet din of the republic of Venice." The great scholars of the Renaissance with whom he corresponded include Shmuel ben Moshe di Modena, Joseph Katz, Solomon Luria, Moses Isserles, Obadiah Sforno, and Moses Alashkar.

Lublin & Chelm in modern Poland

=== Elijah Ba'al Shem of Chelm ===
Rabbi Elijah Ba'al Shem of Chelm was a student of Rabbi Solomon Luria who was, in turn a student of Rabbi Shalom Shachna - father-in-law and teacher of Moses Isserles. Elijah Ba'al Shem of Chelm was also a cousin of Moses Isserles.

=== Eliezer ben Elijah Ashkenazi ===
Rabbi Eliezer ben Elijah Ashkenazi Ha-rofeh Ashkenazi of Nicosia ("the physician") the author of Yosif Lekah on the Book of Esther.

=== Other notable Renaissance Jewish philosophers ===
- Francisco Sanches
- Miguel de Barrios
- Uriel da Costa

== Seventeenth-century Jewish philosophy ==
Altona, Hamburg in modern Germany
Heraklion in modern Crete

With expulsion from Spain came the dissemination of Jewish philosophical investigation throughout the Mediterranean Basin, Northern Europe and the Western Hemisphere. The center-of-mass of Rationalism shifted to France, Italy, Germany, Crete, Sicily and Netherlands. Expulsion from Spain and the coordinated pogroms of Europe resulted in the cross-pollination of variations on Rationalism incubated within diverse communities. This period is also marked by the intellectual exchange among leaders of the Christian Reformation and Jewish scholars. Of particular note is the line of Rationalists who migrated out of Germany, and present-day Italy into Crete, and other areas of the Ottoman Empire seeking safety and protection from the endless pogroms fomented by the House of Habsburg and the Roman Catholic Church against Jews.

Rationalism was incubating in places far from Spain. From stories told by Rabbi Elijah Ba'al Shem of Chelm, German-speaking Jews, descendants of Jews who migrated back to Jerusalem after Charlemagne's invitation was revoked in Germany many centuries earlier, who lived in Jerusalem during the 11th century, were influenced by prevailing Mutazilite scholars of Jerusalem. A German-speaking Palestinian Jew saved the life of a young German man surnamed "Dolberger". When the knights of the First Crusade came to besiege Jerusalem, one of Dolberger's family members rescued German-speaking Jews in Palestine and brought them back to the safety of Worms, Germany, to repay the favor. Further evidence of German communities in the holy city comes in the form of halakic questions sent from Germany to Jerusalem during the second half of the eleventh century.

All of the foregoing resulted in an explosion of new ideas and philosophic paths.

=== Yosef Shlomo ben Eliyahu Dal Medigo ===
Joseph Solomon Delmedigo was a physician and teacher – Baruch Spinoza was a student of his works.

=== Baruch Spinoza ===
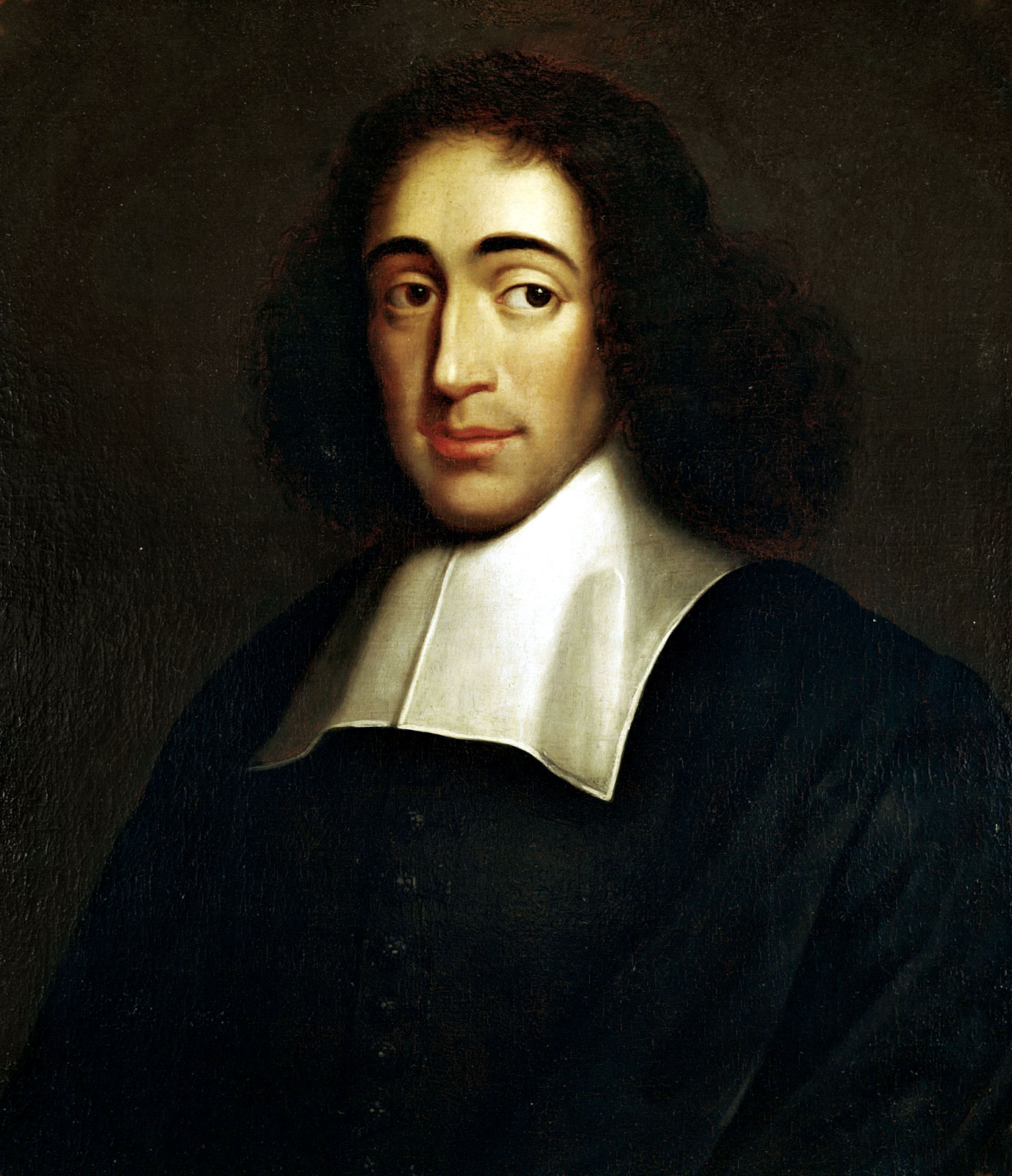
Baruch Spinoza

Baruch Spinoza founded Spinozism, broke with Rabbinic Jewish tradition, and was placed in herem by the Beit Din of Amsterdam. The influence in his work from Maimonides and Leone Ebreo is evident. Elia del Medigo claims to be a student of the works of Spinoza. Some contemporary critics (e.g., Wachter, Der Spinozismus im Judenthum) claimed to detect the influence of the Kabbalah, while others (e.g., Leibniz) regarded Spinozism as a revival of Averroism – a talmudist manner of referencing to Maimonidean Rationalism. In the centuries that have lapsed since the herem declaration, scholars have re-examined the works of Spinoza and find them to reflect a body of work and thinking that is not unlike some contemporary streams of Judaism. For instance, while Spinoza was accused of pantheism, scholars have come to view his work as advocating panentheism, a valid contemporary view easily accommodated by contemporary Judaism.

=== Tzvi Hirsch ben Yaakov Ashkenazi ===
Rabbi Tzvi Hirsch ben Yaakov Ashkenazi was a student of his father, but most notably also a student of his grandfather Rabbi Elijah Ba'al Shem of Chelm.

=== Jacob Emden ===
Rabbi Jacob Emden was a student of his father Rabbi Tzvi Hirsch ben Yaakov Ashkenazi a rabbi in Amsterdam. Emden, a steadfast Talmudist, was a prominent opponent of the Sabbateans (Messianic Kabbalists who followed Sabbatai Tzvi). Although anti-Maimonidean, Emden should be noted for his critical examination of the Zohar concluding that large parts of it were forged.

=== Other seventeenth-century Jewish philosophers ===
- Jacob Abendana Sephardic Rabbi and Philosopher.
- Isaac Cardoso.
- David Nieto Sephardic Rabbi and Philosopher.
- Isaac Orobio de Castro Sephardic Rabbi and Philosopher.

=== Philosophical criticisms of Kabbalah ===
Rabbi Leone di Modena wrote that if we were to accept the Kabbalah, then the Christian trinity would indeed be compatible with Judaism, as the Trinity closely resembles the Kabbalistic doctrine of the Sefirot.

== Eighteenth and nineteenth-century Jewish philosophy ==
Germany - centers of Jewish scholarship
London in modern United Kingdom

A new era began in the 18th century with the thought of Moses Mendelssohn. Mendelssohn has been described as the "'third Moses,' with whom begins a new era in Judaism," just as new eras began with Moses the prophet and with Moses Maimonides. Mendelssohn was a German Jewish philosopher to whose ideas the renaissance of European Jews, Haskalah (the Jewish Enlightenment) is indebted. He has been referred to as the father of Reform Judaism, although Reform spokesmen have been "resistant to claim him as their spiritual father". Mendelssohn came to be regarded as a leading cultural figure of his time by both Germans and Jews. His most significant book was Jerusalem oder über religiöse Macht und Judentum (Jerusalem), first published in 1783.

Alongside Mendelssohn, other important Jewish philosophers of the eighteenth century included:

- Menachem Mendel Lefin, anti-Hasidic Haskalah philosopher.
- Salomon Maimon, Enlightenment philosopher.
- Isaac Satanow, a Haskalah philosopher.
- Naphtali Ullman, Haskalah philosopher.

Important Jewish philosophers of the nineteenth century included:

- Elijah Benamozegh, a Sephardic rabbi and philosopher.
- Hermann Cohen, a neo-Kantian Jewish philosopher.
- Moses Hess, a secular Jewish philosopher and one of the founders of socialism.
- Samson Raphael Hirsch, leader of the Torah im Derech Eretz school of 19th century neo-Orthodoxy.
- Samuel Hirsch, a leader of Reform Judaism.
- Nachman Krochmal, Haskalah philosopher in Galicia.
- Samuel David Luzzatto a Sephardic rabbi and philosopher.
- Karl Marx, German economist and Jewish philosopher.

=== Traditionalist attitudes towards philosophy ===
Haredi traditionalists who emerged in reaction to the Haskalah considered the fusion of religion and philosophy as difficult because classical philosophers start with no preconditions for which conclusions they must reach in their investigation, while classical religious believers have a set of religious principles of faith that they hold one must believe. Most Haredim contended that one cannot simultaneously be a philosopher and a true adherent of a revealed religion. In this view, all attempts at synthesis ultimately fail. Rabbi Nachman of Breslov, for example, viewed all philosophy as untrue and heretical. In this he represents one strand of Hasidic thought, with creative emphasis on the emotions.

Other exponents of Hasidism had a more positive attitude towards philosophy. In the Chabad writings of Schneur Zalman of Liadi, Hasidut is seen as able to unite all parts of Torah thought, from the schools of philosophy to mysticism, by uncovering the illuminating Divine essence that permeates and transcends all approaches. Interpreting the verse from Job, "from my flesh I see HaShem", Shneur Zalman explained the inner meaning, or "soul", of the Jewish mystical tradition in intellectual form, by means of analogies drawn from the human realm. As explained and continued by the later leaders of Chabad, this enabled the human mind to grasp concepts of Godliness, and so enable the heart to feel the love and awe of God, emphasised by all the founders of hasidism, in an internal way. This development, the culminating level of the Jewish mystical tradition, in this way bridges philosophy and mysticism, by expressing the transcendent in human terms.

== 20th and 21st-century Jewish philosophy ==
=== Jewish existentialism ===
A major trend in the timeline of modern Jewish philosophy was the attempt to develop a theory of Judaism based on existentialism. Among the early Jewish existentialist philosophers was Lev Shestov (born Jehuda Leib Schwarzmann), a Russian-Jewish philosopher. Another of the most influential Jewish existentialists in the first half of the 20th century was Franz Rosenzweig. While researching his doctoral dissertation on the 19th-century German philosopher Georg Wilhelm Friedrich Hegel, Rosenzweig reacted against Hegel's idealism and developed an existential approach. For a time, Rosenzweig considered conversion to Christianity, but in 1913, he turned to Jewish philosophy. He became a philosopher and student of Hermann Cohen. Rosenzweig's major work, Star of Redemption, expounded his philosophy, portraying the relationships between God, humanity, and the world as they are connected by creation, revelation, and redemption. Orthodox rabbi Joseph Soloveitchik, and Conservative rabbis Neil Gillman and Elliot N. Dorff, have also been described as existentialists.

French philosopher and Talmudic commentator Emmanuel Levinas, whose approach grew out of the phenomenological tradition in philosophy, has also been described as a Jewish existentialist.

=== Jewish rationalism ===
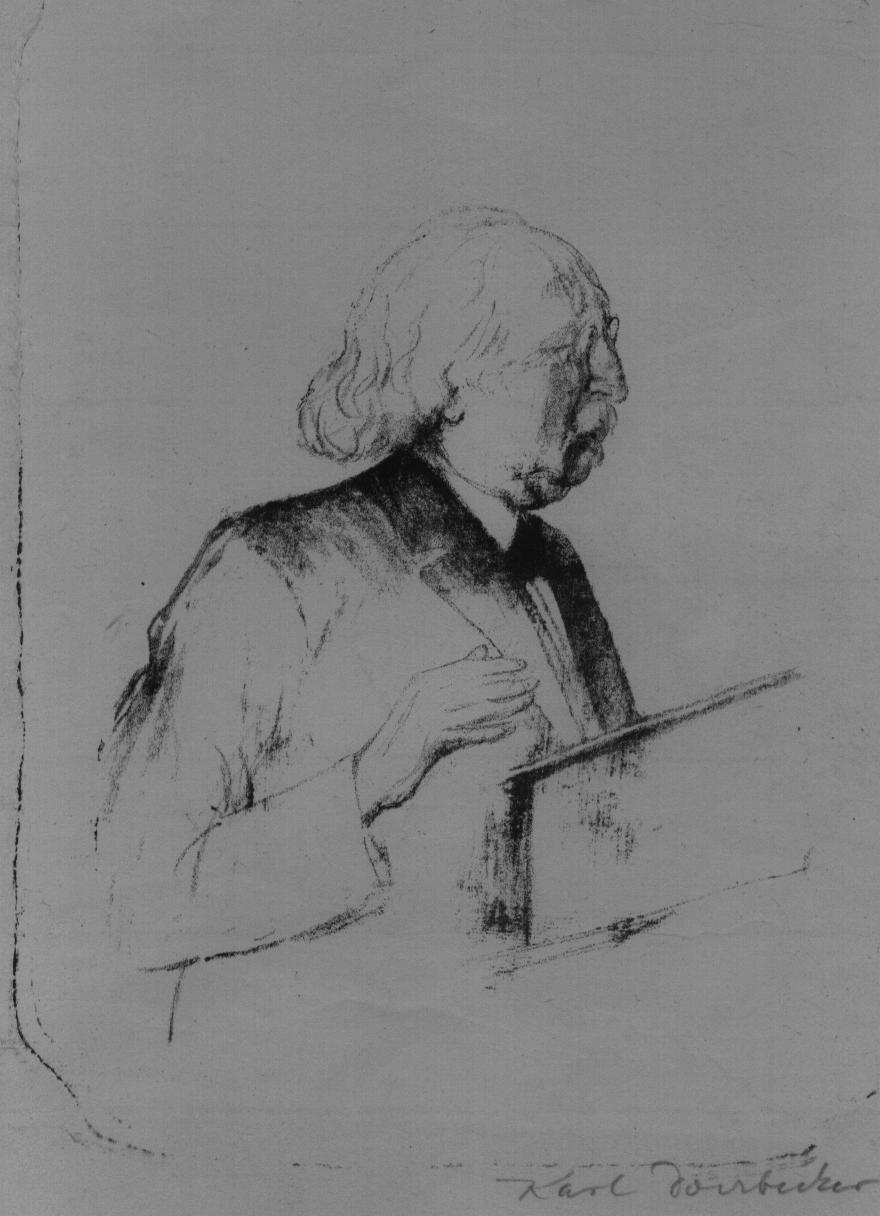
Hermann Cohen

Rationalism re-emerged as a popular perspective among Jews. Contemporary Jewish rationalism often draws on ideas associated with medieval philosophers such as Maimonides and modern Jewish rationalists such as Hermann Cohen.

Cohen was a German Jewish neo-Kantian philosopher who turned to Jewish subjects at the end of his career in the early 20th century, picking up on the ideas of Maimonides. In America, Steven Schwarzschild continued Cohen's legacy. Another prominent contemporary Jewish rationalist is Lenn Goodman, who works out of the traditions of medieval Jewish rationalist philosophy. Conservative rabbis Alan Mittleman of the Jewish Theological Seminary and Elliot N. Dorff of American Jewish University also see themselves in the rationalist tradition, as does David Novak of the University of Toronto. Novak works in the natural law tradition, which is one version of rationalism.

Philosophers in Israel in the rationalist tradition included David Hartman and Moshe Halbertal.

Ramat Gan in modern Israel

Some Orthodox rationalists in Israel take a "restorationist" approach, reaching back in time for tools to simplify Rabbinic Judaism and bring all Jews, regardless of status or stream of Judaism, closer to the observance of Halakha, mitzvot, kashrut, and Maimonides' Jewish principles of faith. Dor Daim and Rambamists are two groups who reject mysticism as a "superstitious innovation" to an otherwise clear and succinct set of laws and rules. According to them, shame and disgrace are attached to failure to investigate matters of religious principle using the fullest powers of human reason and intellect. One cannot be considered wise or perceptive if one does not attempt to understand the origins and establish the correctness of one's beliefs.

=== Holocaust theology ===
Judaism traditionally holds that God is omnipotent, omniscient, and omnibenevolent. These attributes raise complex questions about the existence of evil in the world. A significant challenge for monotheistic faiths is reconciling the existence of positive divine characteristics with the reality of evil. Key questions include the relationship between good and bad and the interplay between God and the concept of a devil. This is known as the problem of evil. Various theodicies have been proposed across monotheistic religions to address this issue. The scale of suffering observed during events such as the Holocaust has led many to re-examine classical theological perspectives. As a result, there is a discussion surrounding Jewish philosophies related to faith in the aftermath of the Holocaust, which is addressed in the field of Holocaust theology.

=== Reconstructionist theology ===
Perhaps the most controversial form of Jewish philosophy that developed in the early 20th century was the religious naturalism of Rabbi Mordecai Kaplan, whose theology was a variant of John Dewey's pragmatist philosophy. Kaplan's naturalism combined nontheist metaphysics with religious terminology to construct a philosophy for those who had lost faith in traditional Judaism. In agreement with the classical, medieval Jewish thinkers, Kaplan affirmed that God is an impersonal being (if a "being" at all) and that all anthropomorphic descriptions of God are, at best, imperfect metaphors. Kaplan's theology went beyond this to claim that God is the sum of all natural processes that allow man to become self-fulfilled, writing that "to believe in God means to take for granted that it is man's destiny to rise above the brute and to eliminate all forms of violence and exploitation from human society."

=== Process theology ===
A recent trend has been to reframe Jewish theology through the lens of process philosophy—more specifically, process theology. Process philosophy suggests that fundamental elements of the universe are occasions of experience. According to this notion, what individuals consider concrete "objects" are successions of occasions of experience. Occasions of experience can be collected into groupings; something complex, such as a human being, is thus a grouping of many smaller occasions of experience. In this view, everything in the universe is characterized by experience (not to be confused with consciousness); this system has no mind-body duality because the "mind" is seen as a very developed kind of experiencing entity.

Intrinsic to this worldview is the notion that prior experiences influence all experiences and will influence all future experiences. This process of influencing is never deterministic; an occasion of experience consists of comprehending other experiences and then reacting to them. This is the "process" in "process philosophy". Process philosophy gives God a special place in the universe of occasions of experience. God encompasses all the other occasions of experience but also transcends them; thus, process philosophy is a form of panentheism.

The original ideas of process theology were developed by Charles Hartshorne (1897–2000) and influenced a number of Jewish theologians, including British philosopher Samuel Alexander (1859–1938), and Rabbis Max Kadushin, Milton Steinberg, Levi A. Olan, Harry Slominsky, and Bradley Shavit Artson. Abraham Joshua Heschel has also been linked to this tradition.

=== Kabbalah and philosophy ===
Kabbalah continued to be central to Haredi Judaism, which generally rejected philosophy; the Chabad strain of Hasidic Judaism showed a more positive attitude towards philosophy. Meanwhile, non-Orthodox Jewish thought in the latter 20th century saw resurgent interest in Kabbalah. In academic studies, Gershom Scholem began the critical investigation of Jewish mysticism, while in non-Orthodox Jewish denominations, Jewish Renewal and Neo-Hasidism spiritualised worship. Many philosophers do not consider this a form of philosophy, as Kabbalah is a collection of esoteric methods of textual interpretation. Mysticism is generally understood as an alternative to philosophy, not a variant of philosophy.

Among the modern critics of Kabbalah was Yihhyah Qafahh, who wrote a book entitled Milhamoth ha-Shem (Wars of the Name) against what he perceived as the false teachings of the Zohar and the Kabbalah of Isaac Luria. He is credited with spearheading the Dor Daim. Yeshayahu Leibowitz publicly shared the views expressed in Rabbi Yihhyah Qafahh's book Milhhamoth ha-Shem and elaborated upon these views in his many writings.

=== Contemporary Jewish philosophy ===
==== Philosophers who are associated with Orthodox Judaism ====
- Eliezer Berkovits
- Monsieur Chouchani
- Eliyahu Dessler
- Israel Eldad
- Elimelech of Lizhensk
- David Hartman
- Samson Raphael Hirsch
- Abraham Isaac Kook
- Yeshayahu Leibowitz
- Menachem Mendel of Kotzk
- Nachman of Breslov
- Franz Rosenzweig
- Tamar Ross
- Daniel Rynhold
- Menachem Mendel Schneerson
- Joseph Soloveitchik
- Chaim Volozhin
- Michael Wyschogrod
- Shneur Zalman of Liadi

==== Philosophers who are associated with Conservative Judaism ====
- Bradley Shavit Artson
- Elliot N. Dorff
- Neil Gillman
- Abraham Joshua Heschel
- William E. Kaufman
- Max Kadushin
- Alan Mittleman
- David Novak
- Ira F. Stone

==== Philosophers who are associated with Reform and Progressive Judaism ====
- Rachel Adler (American rabbi, author, and Feminist philosopher)
- Leo Baeck (leader in German Liberal Judaism)
- Eugene Borowitz (leader in American Reform Judaism)
- Emil Fackenheim (German-Canadian-Israeli philosopher)
- Avigdor Chaim Gold (German-Israeli philosopher)

==== Jewish philosophers whose philosophy is not necessarily focused on Jewish themes ====
In the 20th and 21st centuries, there have also been many philosophers who are Jewish or of Jewish descent and whose Jewish background might influence their approach to some degree but whose writing is not necessarily focused on issues specific to Judaism. These include:

- Theodor W. Adorno
- Joseph Agassi, an Israeli philosopher of science who developed Karl Popper's ideas
- Hannah Arendt
- Raymond Aron
- Zygmunt Bauman
- Walter Benjamin
- Henri Bergson
- Isaiah Berlin
- Ernst Bloch
- Allan Bloom
- Harold Bloom
- Susan Bordo
- Judith Butler
- Noam Chomsky, an American linguist, philosopher, cognitive scientist, and political activist
- Hélène Cixous
- Arthur Danto
- Jacques Derrida
- Hubert Dreyfus
- Ronald Dworkin, an American philosopher of law
- Émile Durkheim
- Yehuda Elkana, an Israeli philosopher of science
- Bracha L. Ettinger
- Viktor Frankl
- Sigmund Freud
- Erich Fromm
- Tamar Gendler
- Emma Goldman
- Lewis Gordon
- Jack Halberstam
- Ágnes Heller
- Max Horkheimer
- Edmund Husserl
- Alberto Jori, an Italian-Jewish philosopher
- Hans Jonas
- Melanie Klein
- Sarah Kofman
- Siegfried Kracauer
- Saul Kripke, a metaphysician and modal logician
- Franz Leopold Neumann
- Emmanuel Levinas
- Claude Lévi-Strauss
- Bernard-Henri Lévy
- Benny Lévy
- Leo Löwenthal
- Rosa Luxemburg
- György Lukács
- Herbert Marcuse
- Karl Marx
- Thomas Nagel, a Serbia-born Jewish philosopher
- Robert Nozick
- Martha Nussbaum, an American moral and political philosopher
- Adi Ophir, an Israeli philosopher of science and moral philosopher
- Friedrich Pollock
- Karl Popper
- Moishe Postone
- Hilary Putnam, an American analytic philosopher
- Ayn Rand, a Russian-American Jewish philosopher who focused upon Aristotle's reason
- Avital Ronell
- Murray Rothbard
- Michael J. Sandel
- Eve Kosofsky Sedgwick, an American queer theorist
- Lev Shestov
- Judith N. Shklar
- Georg Simmel
- Peter Singer, a utilitarian philosopher
- Alan Soble, writes in philosophy of sex, American-born, Romanian-Russian background
- Susan Sontag
- Sandy Stone theorist, artist, and a founder of transgender studies
- Leo Strauss
- Alfred Tarski, Polish logician
- Michael Walzer
- Immanuel Wallerstein
- Ludwig Wittgenstein
- Irvin D. Yalom

== See also ==
- Hasidic philosophy
- Jewish culture
- Jewish denominations
- Jewish ethics
- Jewish existentialism
- Jewish feminism
- Jewish folklore
- Jewish history
- Jewish literature
- Jewish mysticism
- Jewish mythology
- Jewish principles of faith
- Jewish religious movements
- Jewish thought
- Judaism and politics
- Microcosm-macrocosm analogy in Jewish philosophy
- Yeshiva § Ethics, mysticism and philosophy
