= Charlotte Guillard =

French typographer

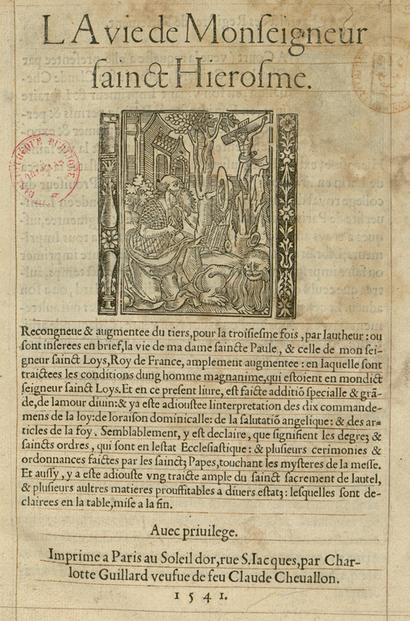
- A book printed by Guillard in 1541
- Born: circa 1480s likely Paris, France or province of Maine
- Died: 1557
- Resting place: Paris, France
- Occupation: printer
- Known for: first woman printer of note
- Spouse(s): 1st husband, Berthold Rembolt 1502; 2nd husband, Claude Chevallon 1520
- Parent(s): Jacques Guillard; Guillemyne Saney

Charlotte Guillard (c. 1485 – 1557) was an early printer who directed the Soleil d'Or printing house in Paris. Annie Parent described her as a "notability of the Rue Saint-Jacques", the street in the Latin Quarter where the shop was located. Twice married and twice widowed, Guillard operated her own publishing imprint for theological books during her two periods of widowhood, that is to say from 1519 to 1520, and 1537 to 1557. While she was not the first woman printer, succeeding both Anna Rugerin of Augsburg (1484) and Anna Fabri of Stockholm (1496), she was the first woman printer with a significantly known career.

== Biography ==
=== Early life ===
Guillard was very likely born in the late 1480s in Saint-Calais, France. Her name is sometime spelled Guillart and in Latin books as Carola Guillard. Living in the province of Maine in France, her parents were Jacques Guillard and Guillemyne Savary. The professions of her parents are unknown, but her known relatives are mostly merchants or lawyers.

=== First marriage ===
Guillard's first marriage was to the Alsatian printer Berthold Rembolt about 1507 (and not 1502 as it has wrongly been assumed). Rembolt collaborated with Ulrich Gering, who had been a partner in the first printing press of France. Gering owned the Soleil d'Or, a printing house of considerable repute. Together, Gering and Rembolt specialised in theological and legal texts.

Gering retired in 1508, and Rembolt died in 1518 or 1519. Thereupon, Guillard ran the Soleil d'Or on her own initiative until her second marriage. She printed seven books during this short time.

=== Second career ===
In 1520 Guillard married Claude Chevallon, a bookseller who also printed theological books. From this time forward, Guillard was known as "la Chevallonne". She was widowed a second time in 1537. Thereafter, Guillard ran her printing business on her own.

The publishing house was led by Guillard, with the help of her correctors: Jean Hucher (until 1538), Jacques Bogard (1538-1541), Louis Miré (1541-1552) and then Guillaume Guillard. She helped her nephew Pierre Haultin become established as a printer and a punchcutter.

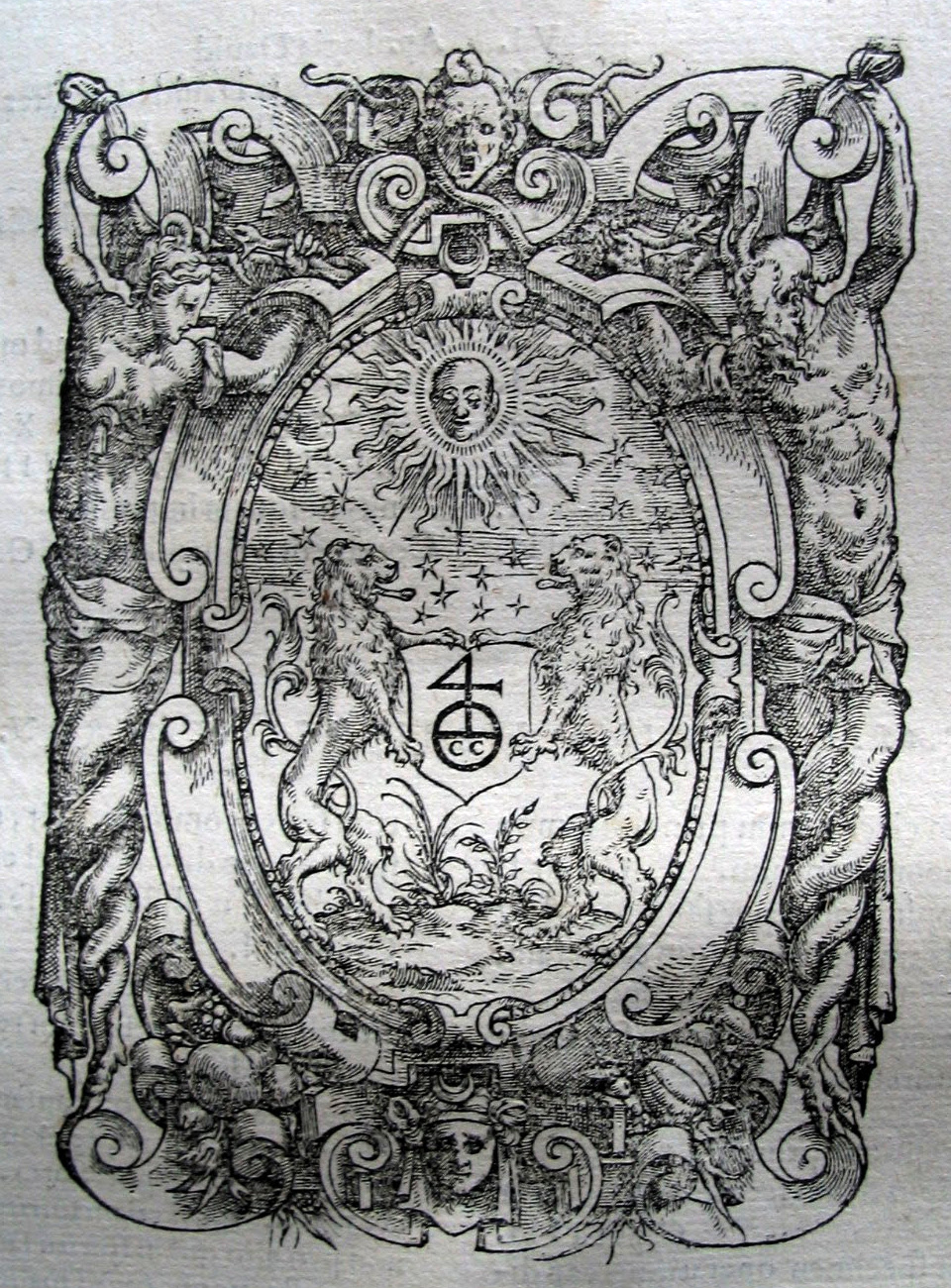
One of Charlotte Guillard's personal printer's marks, which showed a publication had come from one of her studios.

By the end of her career, Guillard's business grew to include a bookstore and five or six printing presses with an estimated 25 to 30 employees. She published about 200 editions, including books her husbands had passed down the rights for, as well as works she chose to acquire and print later on. She catered to students, professional, or religious clientele, often printed anti-Protestant books, and offered books in Latin as well as Greek.

She remained active in the publishing trade until her death in 1557.

More than 400 different libraries worldwide have books printed by Guillard.

== Selected works ==
- Jacques Toussain (Jacobus Tusanus), Lexicon Graecolatinum (1552)
- Louis Lassere, La Vie de Monseigneur Sainct Hierosme (1541) (previously printed by Josse Badius ca. 1529)
- List of works printed by Charlotte Guillard (on Copac)
- Alexandri ab Alexandro iurisperiti Neapolitani genialium dierum libri sex, varia ac recondita eruditione referti (Paris: Carolam Guillard, 1539), from the Lisa Unger Baskin Collection at Duke University.

== See also ==
- List of women printers and publishers before 1800

== Bibliography ==
- Beatrice Beech, "Charlotte Guillard: a sixteenth-century business woman," in: Renaissance Quarterly; No. 36, 3 (Autumn 1983:345-367)
- Rémi Jimenes, "Passeurs d'atelier . La transmission d'une librairie à Paris au XVIe siècle : le cas du Soleil d'Or", Gens du livre et gens de lettres à la Renaissance, Turnhout, Brepols, 2014, p. 309-322.
- Rémi Jimenes, Charlotte Guillard. Une femme imprimeur de la Renaissance, Tours, PUFR, 2017.
- Nelson, Naomi L., Lauren Reno, and Lisa Unger Baskin [eds.]. Five Hundred Years of Women's Work: The Lisa Unger Baskin Collection New York and Durham, NC: The Grolier Club and Duke University, 2019, forthcoming via Oak Knoll Books.
