= Conat =

Conat may refer to:

== People ==
- Abraham Conat, Italian Jewish printer, Talmudist, and physician
- Estellina Conat (fl. 1474–1477), Italian-Jewish printer, first woman known to be active as a printer

== Places ==
- Conat, Pyrénées-Orientales, France
