= Abraham of Sarteano =

Italian Hebrew poet

Abraham of Sarteano (Hebrew: אברהם מסארטיאנו, Italian: Abraham da Sarteano; fl. late 15th century) was an Italian Hebrew poet from Sarteano, Tuscany.

Abraham's only known work is the Hebrew poem Sone ha-Nashim ('The Woman Hater'). The poem consists of fifty tercets in which the author argues against the moral character of women through a series of examples drawn from the Tanakh, rabbinic tradition, and Greek and Roman history and mythology.

Sone ha-Nashim initiated a literary controversy that continued through to the 16th century. It prompted responses defending women by Abigdor de Fano in Ozer Nashim and Elijah of Genazzano in Melitsot, while an earlier rebuttal reportedly written by David ben Judah Messer Leon has not survived.
