= Claude Chevallon =

French printer (1479–1537)

Claude Chevallon (1479–1537) was a 16th-century French printer.

== Life ==
He was born in 1479. He was active as a printer from 1511 to 1537.

In 1520, he married female printer Charlotte Guillard, two years after the death of her first husband Berthold Rembolt, and they worked together to develop the printer-publisher business. Claude Chevallon's printer's mark had been two horses, and he added the sun to this when their shops merged.

When he died in 1537, his widow took over the business, continuing for 20 years until her own death in 1557.

Claude Chevallon had a daughter named Gillette. An illustration in S. Bernardus, Opera omnia, Paris, 1526–27 shows the family group of Chevallon with his wife and daughter; their clothing indicates that they were middle class and quite prosperous.

== Bibliography ==
Some of the notable books printed by him include:

- Legenda Francisci
- Sarum Breviary
- 1516 Destructorium Viciorum by Alexander Carpenter, Paris
