= Shi'ur Qomah =

Esoteric Jewish treatise

The Shi’ur Qomah (Hebrew: שיעור קומה) or Dimensions of the Body is a midrashic text that is part of the hekhalot literature. It purports to record, in anthropomorphic terms, the secret names and precise measurements of God's corporeal limbs and parts. The majority of the text is recorded in the form of sayings or teachings that the angel Metatron revealed to the tanna Rabbi Ishmael, who transmitted it to his students and his contemporary, Rabbi Akiva. It is also an exegetical analysis of Song of Songs 5:11-16 and proclaims that anyone who studies it is guaranteed a portion in the World to Come.

== Provenance and interpretation ==
Currently the text exists only in fragmentary form, and scholars have debated how to date it appropriately. Modern academic scholars of Jewish mysticism such as Gershom Scholem think that it is from “either the Tannaitic or the early Amoraic period.” However, in the 12th century, the rationalist Jewish philosopher Maimonides declared the text to be a Byzantine forgery. Maimonides also believed that the text was so heretical and contrary to proper Jewish belief that it should be burned.

Saadia Gaon also expressed doubts about the origin of the text, and stated that “since it is not found in either Mishna or Talmud, and since we have no way of establishing whether or not it represents the words of Rabbi Ishmael; perhaps someone else pretended to speak in his name.” Nonetheless, in the case that the text were somehow proven to be genuine, Saadia wrote that it would have to be understood in line with his “theory of 'created glory,'" which explains the prophetic theophanies as visions not of God Himself but of a luminous [created] substance.” Moses Narboni also wrote a philosophic work about the text entitled Iggeret ʿal-Shiʿur Qomah (אגרת על שיעור קומה "Epistle on Shi’ur Qomah"), wherein he dismisses the blatant anthropomorphisms of Shi'ur Qomah as speaking strictly metaphorically. Rabbi Narboni’s work in the Iggeret is a “meditation on God, Measure of all existing things. It is based on Abraham ibn Ezra's commentary on Exodus, and, with the aid of biblical and rabbinical passages, studies two kinds of knowledge: God's knowledge of his creatures, called knowledge of the Face; and His creatures’ knowledge of God, called knowledge of the Back (an allusion to Exodus 33:23).”

== See also ==
- Jewish mysticism
- Heresy in Judaism
- Medieval Jewish Philosophy
- Moses Taku
