= Abraham ben David Caslari =

Abraham ben David Caslari was a Catalan-Jewish physician. He lived at Besalú, Catalonia, in the first half of the fourteenth century. Caslari was considered one of the most skillful physicians of his time. He was the teacher of Moses Narboni of Perpignan, and one of the ten notables to whom, in 1323, Kalonymus ben Kalonymus of Arles addressed his treatise on morals, entitled, Eben Bochan (Touchstone).

== Works ==
Abraham was the author of the following medical works, still extant in manuscript:

- Aleh Ra'anan (Verdant Leaf), or, as it is quoted by Judah ben Natan, Aleh ha-Refu'ah (The Leaf of Healing), a treatise on fevers, divided into five books and completed in November 1326. The author says that he wrote the book at the request of his friends, who wished to possess a vade mecum on these matters.
- Ma'mar be-Qaddachot ha-Debriyot u-Mine ha-Qaddachot, a treatise on pestilential and other fevers, composed in 1349, when the Black Death decimated the populations of Provence, Catalonia, and Aragon.
- Dine ha-Haqqazah (Rules for Bleeding), Turin MS. No. 121.
- Mekalkel Machalah (Who Sustains in Sickness), only an extract from which has been preserved (Neubauer, Cat. Bodl. Hebr. MS. No. 2142, 39).

He is also said to have translated into Latin the Antidotarium of Razi. The Book of Foods, written by Isaac Israeli the Elder, is falsely ascribed to Caslari. Profiat Duran Efodi of Perpignan, called in Hebrew "Isaac b. Moses ha-Levi," borrowed from Caslari the astronomic note which he cites in his commentary on the Moreh Nebukim of Maimonides. Caslari is also mentioned by Nissim Gerondi (Responsa, No. 33).
