= Moses of Narbonne =

14th-century Catalan philosopher and physician

Moses ben Joshua of Narbonne, also known as Moses of Narbonne, mestre Vidal Bellshom, maestro Vidal Blasom, and Moses Narboni, was a medieval Jewish philosopher and physician born in Perpignan in the Kingdom of Majorca at the end of the thirteenth century. He died sometime after 1362. He began studying philosophy with his father when he was thirteen and then studied with Moses and Abraham ben David Caslari. He studied medicine and eventually became a successful physician, and was well versed in Biblical and rabbinic literature.

Eventually, he traveled to the Crown of Aragon, where he is known to have lived and studied in Cervera (1348–1349). During the an outbreak of the Black Death, when persecution of Jews was widespread, ben Joshua was forced to flee when an angry mob attacked the Jewish community there. He subsequently lived in Barcelona, where he wrote a commentary on the medieval philosophical tale Hayy ibn Yaqdhan, in which he called to appropriate autodidacticism as a pedagogical program. He also lived in Valencia. He also lived in the Kingdom of Castile in Toledo, Burgos and Soria (1358–1362). In 1362, he returned to Perpignan and died there.

Moses was an admirer of Averroes; he devoted a great deal of study to his works and wrote commentaries on several of them. Perhaps Narboni's best-known work is his Treatise on the Perfection of the Soul.

He believed that Judaism was a guide to the highest degree of theoretical and moral truth. In common with others of his era he believed that the Torah had both a simple, direct meaning accessible to the average reader as well as a deeper, metaphysical meaning accessible to thinkers. He rejected the belief in miracles, instead believing they could be explained, and defended man's free will by philosophical arguments. Because of these and other beliefs, he was not accepted by many in the rabbinical Jewish community for fear of his figurative membership in the school of extreme rationalism which gave rise to questions of his legitimacy as an authority on Jewish law, custom and philosophy.

== Known writings ==
- "Perush mi-Millot ha-Higgayon," on the terminology of Maimonides' Treatise on Logic
- commentary on the "Guide for the Perplexed"
- "Ma'amar Alexander be-Sekel," supercommentary on Averroes' commentary on Alexander of Aphrodisias' work on the intellect
- a commentary on Averroes' "middle" commentary on Aristotle's "Physics"
- a commentary on Averroes' paraphrase of the "Organon"
- a commentary on the fourth part of Avicenna's "Canon"
- a commentary on al-Ghazali's "Maqaṣid al-Falasifah"
- "Iggeret 'Al-Shi'ur Qomah," a mystical letter on the "Shi'ur Qomah," attributed to Rabbi Ishmael
- a commentary on the Book of Lamentations
- a commentary on Averroes' treatise on the hylic intellect and the possibility of conjunction
- "Shelemut ha-Nefesh," a collection of Aristotle's and Averroes' writings on the soul
- a commentary on Averroes' dissertation on physics and on the treatise "De Substantia Orbis"
- "Kitab Ḥai ben Yaqdhan," commentary on the philosophical novel of Ibn Tufayl
- "Oraḥ Ḥayyim," a treatise on medicine
- "Ma'amar bi-Beḥirah," a treatise on free will written in refutation of Abner of Burgos
- a commentary on Averroes' commentary on the "De Cœlo et Mundo"
- a treatise on metaphysics
- "Pirḳe Mosheh," philosophical aphorisms
- "Iggeret Meyuḥedet," on Abraham ibn Ezra's commentary on Genesis 11:2
