= Berthold Rembolt =

German-French printer (died 1518)

Berthold Rembolt (died 1518) was an early printer.

== Life ==
He was originally from Ehenheim in Alsace.

He died in 1518.

== Career ==
Though a native of Strasbourg, he worked in Paris. His printing career began in 1494. He was a contemporary of Guillaume Fichet, Charlotte Guillard and Ulrich Gering. He worked alone or in collaboration with Gering, at the Soleil d'Or rue Sorbonne (1494-1508), with J. Waterloes (1511), and L. Hornken (1512).

Among the notable books printed by Remboldt are the Missale Parisiense, Pope Gregory the Great's Dialogorum libri quattor, and Erasmus' Familiarum colloquiorum formulae et alia quaedam recognita

Remboldt's business was continued by his widow Charlotte Guillard, who in 1520, two years after his death, married the printer and bookseller Claude Chevallon (1479–1537). Claude Chevallon's printer's mark had been two horses, and to these he added the sun, the sign over Rembolt's shop, when the two shops merged.

== Printed Works ==
To give at least an idea of the output of Remboldt and his partners, this is a partial list in approximately chronological order, based unless otherwise indicated on the online database of the Gesamtkatalog der Wiegendrucke (an international catalogue of incunabula).

- 28./29.II.1491-92, Paulus Apostolus, Epistolae canonicae, Paris, U. Gering & B. Remboldt
- 9.XII.1493–18.I.1494: Psalterium, Psalterium Parisiense, Paris, [U. Gering & B. Remboldt]
- 1494: Guillelmus Hilacensis, Sermones super orationem dominicam, Paris, [U. Gering & B. Remboldt]
- 6.III.1494/95: Gregorius Magnus, Dialogi, Paris, [U. Gering & B. Remboldt]
- 8.V.1494: Augustinus, De sermone Domini in monte habito, Paris, [U. Gering & B. Remboldt]
- 30.VI.1494 : Guillelmus Peraldus, Sermones de tempore super epistolas, Paris, [U. Gering & B. Remboldt] ,
- 5.VII.1494: Alexander de Villa Dei, Doctrinale. P. 1–4, Paris, [U. & Gering & B. Remboldt]
- 18.VIII.1494: Guido Juvenalis, Interpretatio in Laurentii Vallae Elegantias latinae linguae, Paris, [U. Gering & B. Remboldt]
- 16.XII.1494: Horae, Horae ad usum Romanum (Almanach 1495–1508), Paris, [U. Gering & B. Remboldt]
- 1494: Vergilius Maro, Opera, Paris, [U. Gering & B. Rembold]
- 31.X.1495: Gregorius Magnus, Moralia in Job, Paris, [U. Gering & B. Remboldt]
- 19.XII.1495: Laurentius Valla, Elegantiae linguae latinae, Paris [U. Gering & B. Remboldt]
- c. 1495: Psalterium, Psalterium cum hymnis; Hymni per totum annum dicendi, Paris, U. Gering & B. Remboldt
- c. 1495-1500: Grammatica, Grammatica. Compilatio grammaticae et logicae, Paris, [U. Gering & B. Remboldt]
- 23.IV.1496: Nicolaus Perottus, Cornucopiae. In Plinii prooemium, Paris, [U. Gering & B. Remboldt]
- 9.VIII.1496: Diurnale, Diurnale Parisiense, Paris, [U. Gering & B. Remboldt]
- 16.VIII.1496: Breviarium, Breviarium Belvacense, Paris, [U. Gering & B. Remboldt]
- 15.X.[1496(?): Horae, Horae ad usum Parisiensem (Almanach 1488/1495–1508), Paris, [U. Gering & B. Remboldt]
- 24.XII.1497: Missale, Missale Parisiense, Paris, [U. Gering & B. Remboldt for Simon Vostre]
- 2.I.1497: Missale, Missale Sarum, Paris, [U. Gering & B. Remboldt for Wynkyn de Worde]
- 31.III.1497: Breviarium, Breviarium Cameracense, Paris, [U. Gering & B. Remboldt]
- 1497(?) or probably 16.X.1512: Johannes Trithemius, De scriptoribus ecclesiasticis, Paris, [B. Remboldt for Jean Petit]
- pre-1498: Rituale, Rituale ad usum Sarum, Paris, [U. Gering & B. Remboldt]
- 16.I.1498-99: Gregorius Magnus, Expositio in Canticum Canticorum, Paris, [U. Gering & B. Remboldt]
- 7.III.1498-99: Horae, Horae ad usum Parisiensem (Paris) (Almanach 1498–1509), Paris, [U. Gering & B. Remboldt]
- 24.V.1498: Vergilius Maro, Opera, Paris [U. Gering & B. Remboldt]
- 18.VII.1498: Gregorius Magnus, Regula pastoralis, Paris, [U. Gering & B. Remboldt]
- 8.IX.1498: Horae, Horae ad usum Parisiensem (Paris) (Almanach 1498–1508), Paris, U. Gering & B. Remboldt for Simon Vostre
- 1498: Guillelmus Peraldus, Sermones de tempore super epistolas, Paris, [U. Gering & B. Remboldt]
- c. 1498: Bescryvinghe Bescryvinghe der cristliken ghelove, Paris, [U. Gering & B. Remboldt]
- 16.III.1499: Gregorius IX, Decretales; Bernardus Parmensis, Glossae, Paris [U. Gering & B. Remboldt]
- 20.VI.1499: Corpus, Corpus iuris civilis; Iustiniani Institutiones, Paris, [U. Gering & B. Remboldt]
- 28.XI.1499: Paulus Apostolus, Epistolae; [commentaries of Beda Venerabilis, Augustinus, Johannes Chrysostomus], Paris, [U. Gering & B. Remboldt]
- c. 1499: Augustinus, Sermones, Paris, [U. Gering & B. Remboldt]
- 30.IV.1500: Nicolaus Perottus, Cornucopiae; In Plinii prooemium, Paris, [U. Gering & B. Remboldt]
- 30.V.1500: Alexander de Villa Dei, Doctrinale. P. 1–4, Paris, [B. Remboldt]
- 1500: Ludolphus de Saxonia, Expositio Psalterii, Paris, [U. Gering & B. Remboldt]
- 1500: Petrus Tartaretus, Duns Scoti quaestiones quodlibetales reportatae, Paris, [B. Remboldt]
- c. 1500: Ludolphus de Saxonia, Expositio Psalterii, Paris, [U. Gering & B. Remboldt]
- 1500-1501: Bonifatius VIII, Liber sextus Decretalium, etc., Paris, [U. Gering & B. Remboldt]
- post 1500(?): Bernardus Claravallensis, De concordantia statuum religiosorum; De dispensatione et praecepto, Paris, [U. Gering & B. Remboldt for Denis Roce]
- c. 1505: Brocardica, Brocardica iuris, Paris, [U. Gering & B. Remboldt for Jean Petit]
- c. 1510/18 Croix, La Croix de par dieu (ABC des chrestiens), Paris, [B. Remboldt]
- 12.I.1513: Missale, Missale ad consuetudinem ecclesie Sarum, Paris, [B. Remboldt]
- 1523: Missale, Missale ad consuetudinem ecclesie Sarum, Paris, [B. Remboldt]
