= Hoter ben Shlomo =

Scholar and philosopher from Yemen

Hoter ben Shlomo (Hoteb/Hatab ben Shlomo, Manṣūr ibn Sulaymān al-Dhamārī, Manṣūr ibn Sulaymān al-Ghamari, c.1400–c.1480) was a scholar and philosopher from Yemen who was heavily influenced by the earlier works of Natan'el al-Fayyumi, Maimonides, Saadia Gaon and al-Ghazali.

The connection between the Epistle of the Brethren of Purity and Isma'ilism might have suggested the adoption of this work as one of the main sources of what would become known as “Jewish Ismailism” as was found in late medieval Yemenite Judaism. This “Jewish Ismailism” consisted of adapting Ismaili doctrines about cosmology, prophecy and hermeneutics. There are many examples of the Brethren of Purity influencing Yemenite Jewish philosophers and authors in the period 1150-1550.

For example, chapter two of the Judaeo-Arabic theologic-philosophical work by Natan'el al-Fayyumi, The Garden of Intellects (Bustan al-‘uqul), written in Yemen in 1165, includes a correspondence between the numbers 1 through 10 and ten scientific and philosophical concepts (soul's faculties, senses, directions, bodily substances and parts, etc.) most of which are identical to those listed by the Brethren of Purity.

Some traces of Brethren of Purity doctrines, as well as of their numerology or Hurufism, are found in two Yemenite philosophical midrashim written in 1420-1430: "The Glad Learning" (Midrash ha-hefez) by Zerahyah ha-Rofé (Yahya al-Tabib) and the "Lamp of Intellects" (Siraj al-‘uqul) by Hoter ben Solomon. Ḥoter’s ideas are expounded in his al-Qawāʿid "Commentary" [on Maimonides’ Thirteen Principles]", the Sabʿīn Masʾala "Seventy Questions" and Miʾa Masʾala "One Hundred Questions", listed together as Sheʾelot u-Teshuvot Hoter ben Shelomo, the Sirāj al-ʿUqūl "Lamp of the Intellects", a midrash to the Torah, and Sharh ʿalā Perush ha-Mishna [shel ha-Rambam] "Explication of [Maimonides’] Commentary to the Mishna".
