= Estellina Conat =

Italian-Jewish printer

Estellina Conat (fl. 1474–1477) was an Italian-Jewish printer. She was the first woman active as a printer.

Estellina Conat lived in Mantua, Italy, during the second half of the 15th century. She was married to the Jewish physician Abraham Conat of Mantua and Ferrara, who founded the first Jewish printing press in 1475. Estellina played an active and significant role in the printing house. She is explicitly credited in the colophon of the book Beḥinat Olam (a philosophical poem by Jedaiah Bedersi), where she refers to herself as the kotevet (scribe or editor):

I, Estellina, the wife of my lord and husband, the honourable teacher master Abraham Conat (may he see offspring and length of days, amen), wrote this Epistle on the Examination of the World with the assistance of the young man Jacob Levi from Tarascon in Provence, long may he live, amen.

She was active in the family printing press business independently of her spouse.

== See also ==
- Anna Rugerin
- Anna Fabri

== Sources ==
- The JPS Guide to Jewish Women: 600 B.C.E.to 1900 C.E.
- Anna Bellavitis: Women’s Work and Rights in Early Modern Urban Europe
- https://jwa.org/encyclopedia/article/printers
