= Ulrich Gering =

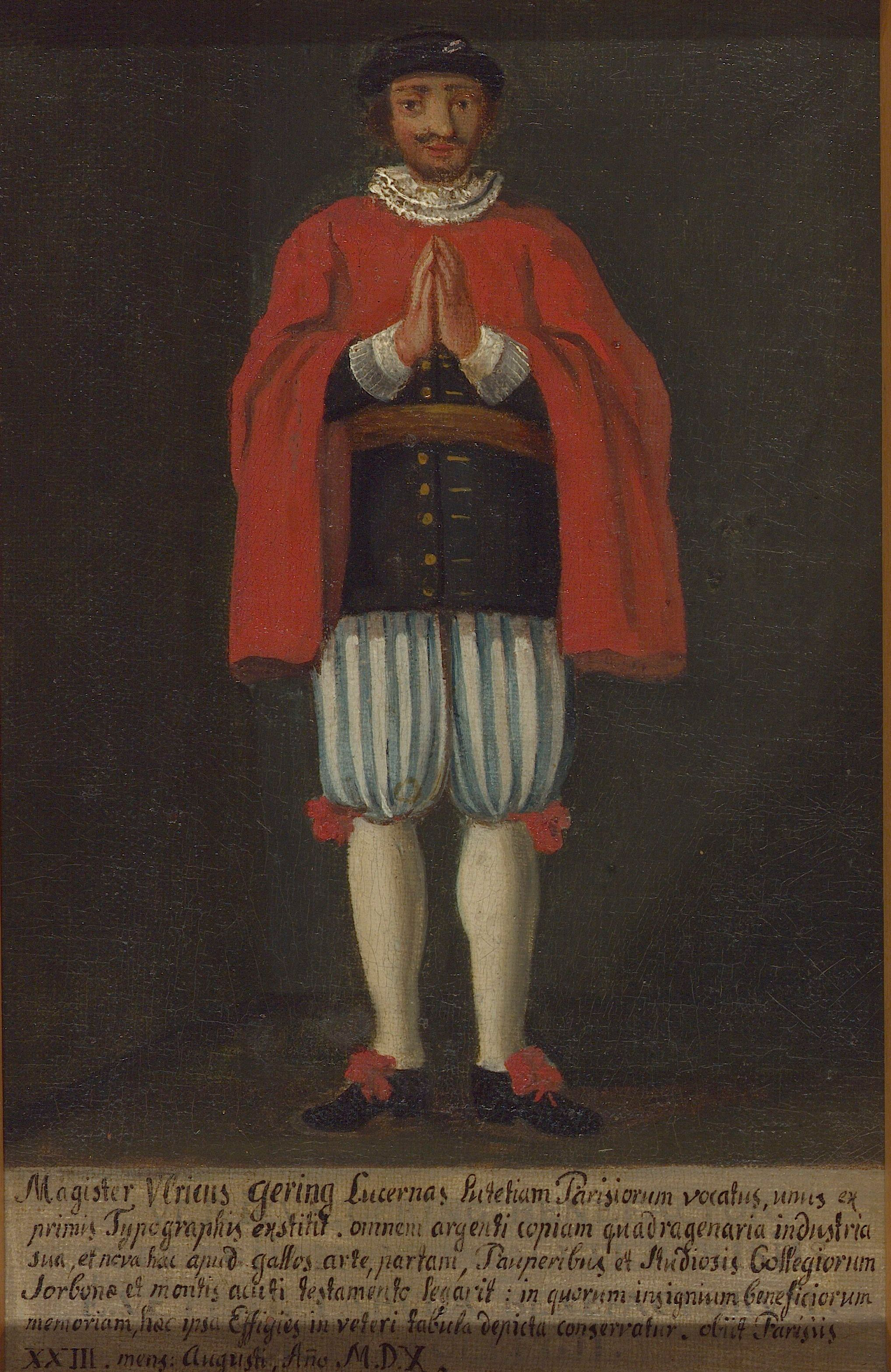
Portrait of Ulrich Gering

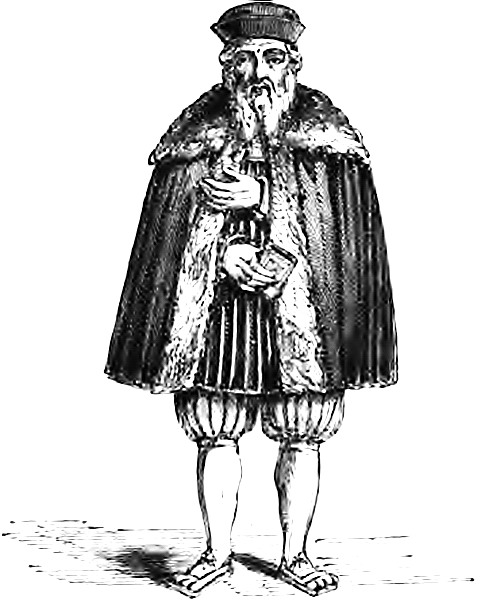
Portrait of Ulrich Gering engraved by Boudan

Ulrich Gering (active as a printer in Paris from c. 1470 to 1508 – 23 August 1510) came from Beromünster in the diocese of Constance. He was one of three partners to establish the first printing press in France.

Invited to Paris in 1469 by the Rector of the Sorbonne, Johann Heynlin, and his colleague Guillaume Fichet, Gering together with Michael Friburger and Martin Crantz set up a printing press within the Sorbonne to produce texts selected and edited by his patrons. The press produced 22 works between 1470 and 1472.

By the end of 1472 this subsidised venture came to a close and the three printers left the Sorbonne to set up on their own at the sign of the Soleil d'Or on the rue Saint Jacques in Paris. The partnership came to an end in 1477, after which Gering continued to print on his own, moving in 1483 to the rue de Sorbonne at the same sign. Between 1484 and 1494 books printed at the Soleil d'Or carry the names of Jean Higman (1484–1489) and George Wolf (1490–1492). Gering is found there again in partnership with Berthold Rembolt from 1494 to 1508, after which Rembolt worked alone.
