= Abraham Conat =

Italian Jewish printer and physician

Abraham ben Solomon Conat (flourished at Mantua in the second half of the 15th century) was an Italian Jewish printer, Talmudist, and physician.

He obtained the title of ḥaber (associate of a rabbi) for his learning, but displayed it chiefly in the choice of works selected by him for printing, which art he and his wife Estellina expressly learned. He embarked upon the business of printing at Mantua in 1476, and became celebrated as one of the earliest printers of Hebrew books in Europe, producing the third to the tenth of Hebrew incunabula as recorded by Giovanni Bernardo De Rossi.

In 1475 he established a printing-office at Mantua, from which he issued:

- Tur Orah Hayyim, by R. Jacob ben Asher (1476)
- Tur Yoreh De'ah, by the same author, only one-third of which, however, was printed by him, the rest being executed at Ferrara
- Behinat Olam, by Jedaiah Bedersi, in which Conat was assisted by his wife Estellina and Jacob Levi of Tarascon
- The commentary on the Pentateuch by Levi ben Gershon (Ralbag)
- Luhot, astronomical tables giving the length of day at different times of the year, by Mordecai Finzi
- Sefer Yosippon, the pseudo-Josephus or Gorionides
- Eldad ha-Dani
- Nofet Zufim, the rhetoric of Messer Leon (Judah). This was the first book published featuring the work of a living Jewish author.

All these books were printed between 1476 and 1480, when the business was suspended on account of the rivalry of Abraham ben Ḥayyim at Ferrara.

Abraham Conat was proud of his work; he used to accompany his name in the colophons by the words "Who writes with many pens without the help of miracles, for the spread of the Torah in Israel." He was especially delighted that four pages could be printed at one time on a large sheet, and that he could produce two thousand pages every day. His type was of such a shape that his editions are often taken for manuscripts.
