= Anna Rügerin =

- Occupation: Typographer
- Years active: fl. 1480s
- Notable work: Sachsenspiegel, Formulare und deutsch rhetorica

Anna Rügerin (died after 1484), is considered to be the first female typographer to inscribe her name in the colophon of a book, in the 15th century. In 1484, Rügerin printed two books in the in-folio format, in a press she owned in the city of Augsburg (Germany). Her work appeared less than twenty years after the arrival of the movable-type printing press in that city.

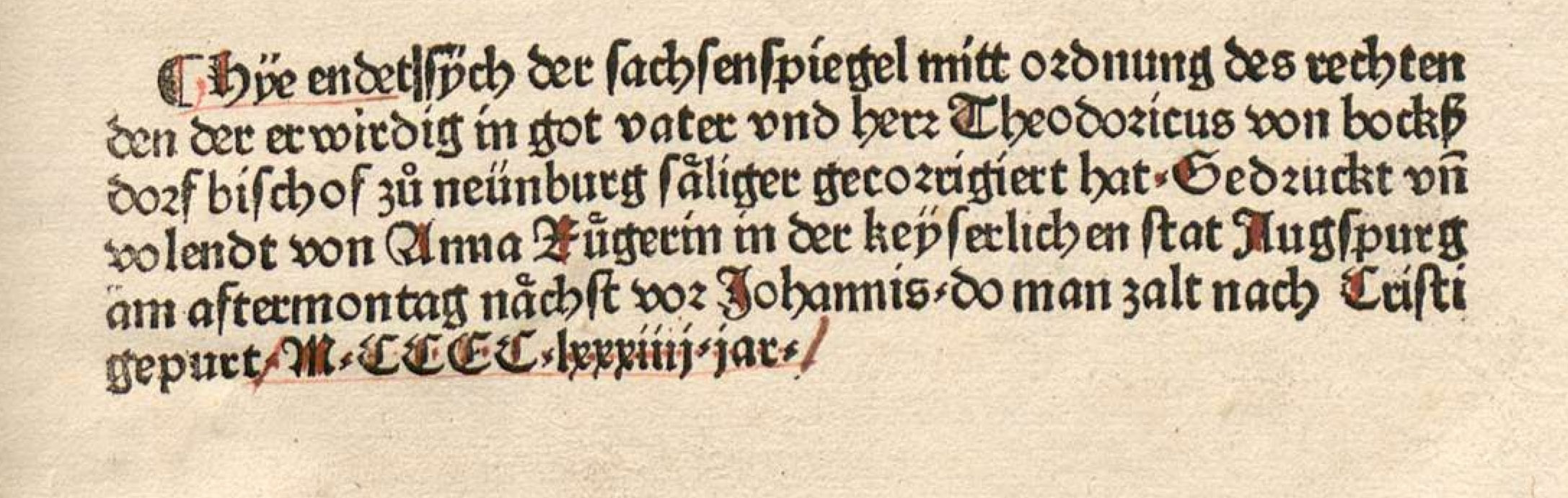
The colophon from Sachsenspiegel: Landrecht, printed in Augsburg by Anna Rügerin, 22 June 1484

The first of Rügerin's known books is an edition of Eike of Repgow's compendium of customary law, the Sachsenspiegel, dated 22 June 1484. The Sachsenspiegel, written in the 13th century, was the first major work of German prose. The catalogue Beschreibung derjenigen bücher welch von erfindung der buchdruckerkunst bis M.d.xx ... gedruckt worden sind by Georg Wolfgang Panzer details some of its characteristics. The colophon of the book says the following:

Hye endet sich der sachsenspiegel mitt ordnung des rechten den der erwirdig in got vater und herr Theodoricus von bockßdorf bischof zu neünburg säliger gecorrigieret hat. Gedruckt und volendt von Anna Rügerin in der keyserlichen stat Augspurg am aftermontag nächst vor Johannis. do man zalt nach Cristi gepurt/M.CCCC.lxxxiiij.jar./

Here ends the Sachsenspiegel by order of the judge which the honorable in god our father and lord Theodoricus of bockßdorf bishop of neünburg blessed be corrected. Printed and finished by Anna Rügerin in the imperial city of Augsburg on the Tuesday before St. John's Day. As one counts from the Birth of Christ 1484 years.

The second book was an edition of the Formulare und deutsch rhetorica, a manual of instructions for the editing of official documents and of letters, printed on 29 July 1484.

These books were composed in the Gothic font 1:120G of Johann Schönsperger. The researcher Sheila Edmunds identifies Schönsperger as the brother of Anna Rügerin, as his mother, Barbara Traut Schönsperger, married the printer Johann Bämler as her second husband (probably in 1467 or 1468). This marriage, according to Edmunds, would have produced an extensive familial network devoted to the book trade in Augsburg. Anna Rügerin's husband, Thomas Rüger, jointly published books with Schönsperger in 1481 and 1482. Johann Schönsperger could have helped Anna Rügerin (who had inherited Rüger's press) to make her first printing.

== See also ==
- Estellina Conat, a contemporary female typographer in Italy.
- Anna Fabri, a contemporary female typographer in Sweden.
