= Anna Fabri =

- Years active: 1483 - ?
- Known for: First Female Swedish Printer

Anna Fabri, née Ghotan (floruit 1496), was a Swedish publisher and printer. She was the first female book printer in Sweden.

She was likely the sister of book printer Bartholomeus Ghotan from Lübeck, who alongside Johann Snell became the first secular book printers in Sweden in 1483. She married printer Johann Fabri, who took over the business of Snell in 1487; she later took over his business as a widow in 1496. Among her work was Brevianse Strengenense, Breviens Upsalea and some magistri impressorie artis are known.

== See also ==
- List of women printers and publishers before 1800
- Anna Rügerin, a contemporary female typographer in Germany.
- Estellina Conat, a contemporary female typographer in Italy.
