= Judah Messer Leon =

Italian rabbi and philosopher

Judah ben Jehiel, (Hebrew: יהודה בן יחיאל, c. 1420 to 1425 – c. 1498), more usually called Judah Messer Leon (Hebrew: יהודה מסר לאון), was an Italian rabbi, teacher, physician, and philosopher. Through his works, assimilating and embodying the intellectual approach of the best Italian universities of the time, yet setting it inside the intellectual culture of Jewish tradition, he is seen as a quintessential example of a hakham kolel ("comprehensive scholar"), a scholar who excelled in both secular and rabbinic studies, the Hebrew equivalent of a Renaissance man. This was the ideal he tried to instil in his students. One of his students was Yohanan Alemanno.

== Life ==
Judah is thought to have been born in around 1420 at Montecchio Maggiore, now in the Italian province of Vicenza. The son of a doctor, he was ordained as a rabbi and received a diploma in medicine while in his early 20s. According to tradition the honorific title Messer (a title of knighthood) was bestowed on him by the Frederick III, Holy Roman Emperor, during the emperor's first visit to Italy in 1452, perhaps for work for him as a physician. The name "Leon" is the usual equivalent of "Judah", through the traditional identification of the lion of Judah.

Messer Leon settled as a rabbi at Ancona at about this time, and established a yeshiva, or academy, where he combined the traditional study of the Jewish texts with lectures on the non-Jewish program of the medieval secular curriculum. This academy was to follow him wherever he stayed around Italy over the next four decades. He was also licensed to practice medicine, and his successful activities in this field brought him much acclaim. Between 1456 and 1472 he lived in Padua and Bologna, where he may have studied further at the famous Universities. He is said to have been awarded the title Doctor in Padua in 1469. After a short stay in Venice, where his son David was born, in 1473 he became rabbi in Mantua. There he fell into a conflict with his colleague Joseph Colon Trabotto, in consequence of which both were expelled from the city in 1475.

In 1480 he settled in Naples, then under the accommodating rule of Ferdinand I. He remained there, with his academy, for virtually the whole of the rest of his life, until he and his son David were forced to flee in 1495, the year after the death of King Ferdinand, to escape the violent pogroms that ensued following the capture of the city by the French under Charles VIII. An ordination document issued by David in September 1499 refers to his father as by then already dead. Rabinowitz conjectures that Messer Leon had been with David, and died at Monastir (present-day Bitola in the Republic of Macedonia) in that year. However, Tirosh-Rothschild (p. 253, n. 104) believes he was still in Naples, and died there in 1497.

== Works ==
Messer Leon wrote extensively, including commentaries on the Organon, the Nicomachean Ethics, and the Physics of Aristotle, and their analysis by Averroes, in which he followed the Scholastic style and methods, composing for his students "summaries (sefeqot) on the Scholastic quaestiones (i.e. points of apparent textual contradiction) debated by the Italian academic community", drawing closely on the style and substance of expositions then current at Padua.

These commentaries were written primarily for his close followers. More generally circulated were three textbooks addressing the three foundation subjects of a Renaissance secular education, the trivium ("three ways") of grammar, logic and rhetoric, seen as the essential prerequisite disciplines necessary for higher studies in the humanities, philosophy, and medicine. These subjects he covered with a Hebrew grammar under the title Libnat ha-Sappir (The Pavement of Sapphire) in 1454, a textbook on logic entitled Miklal Yofi (Perfection of Beauty) in 1455, and, most celebrated, a textbook of rhetoric called Nofet Zufim (The Honeycomb's Flow), which was printed by Abraham Conat of Mantua in 1475-6, the only work by a living author printed in Hebrew in the fifteenth century.

Like non-Jewish contemporary texts, the Nofet Zufim drew heavily on the classical theoretical writings of Cicero and Quintilian. But unlike its contemporaries, it took as its exemplars for such theories not the foremost orators of Greek and Roman antiquity, but Moses and the leading figures of the Hebrew Bible. In the opinion of Deutsch, the object of the work was both apologetic and propagandic. The author desired to demonstrate to the non-Jewish world that the Jews were not devoid of the literary sense, and he wished to prove to his co-religionists that Judaism is not hostile to secular studies, which contribute to a better appreciation of Jewish literature. Although in later centuries the book was largely forgotten, and was not reprinted until the nineteenth century, in the intellectual circle of its own time it was highly appreciated. Azariah dei Rossi quoted Leon as a witness to the value of secular studies, and Joseph Solomon Delmedigo recommended the book to the Karaite Zeraḥ bar Natan of Trakai. In recent times interest has been renewed, with a new scholarly edition with translation and commentary published in 1983.

== Descendants ==
Following on from his father, Messer Leon's son also became a noted rabbi, physician and author, and defender of the value of the secular disciplines of the Renaissance to Jewish philosophy culture and study. David became best known for his Ein ha-Kore (Eye of the Reader), a sympathetic commentary on Maimonides' The Guide for the Perplexed; and posthumously for his Tehillah le-Dawid (Glory to David), an encyclopedic summary of Jewish philosophy, edited by his grandson Aaron ben Judah (Constantinople, 1577).
