= David ben Judah Messer Leon =

- Title: Rabbi

Personal life
- Born: David ben Judah Messer Leon; 1470 Republic of Venice
- Died: 1526 (aged 55–56)

Religious life
- Religion: Judaism

David ben Judah Messer Leon (c. 1470 in Venice – c. 1526 in Salonica) was an Italian rabbi, physician and writer, who defended the value of secular disciplines and the Renaissance humanities as an important part of traditional Jewish studies.

== Life ==
David ben Judah was educated at Avellino in the school of his father, Judah Messer Leon, author of Libnat ha-Sappir, and received at the age of eighteen his rabbinical diploma from German and French Talmudic authorities. Soon afterward he went to Padua, where he studied under Judah Minz, who granted him a new rabbinical diploma. After further studies in Florence, he returned to Avellino in 1492, where he practised as a physician and taught in his father's academy. However, in 1495 the city fell to the French under Charles VIII, and he fled east to the Ottoman Empire to escape the violent pogroms that ensued, spending time in Istanbul before moving sometime between 1498 and 1504 to teach Torah in Salonica, at that time in a state of intellectual vibrancy due to the settlement there of many Sephardi exiles forced to leave after the expulsion of the Jews from Spain in 1492, Sicily in 1493, and Portugal in 1496.

It was while he was at Salonica that he completed his most major work, the Ein ha-Kore (Eye of the Reader), a sympathetic commentary defending Maimonides' Guide for the Perplexed, criticizing the commentary of Isaac Abravanel. The reputation of the book spread, and he was called to the rabbinate of Avlona in 1510 at a salary of 70 florins a year. The community possessed three congregations of various nationalities, and Leon officiated successively in the three synagogues on every third Saturday. In the very first year of his rabbinate dissensions on account of a ritual question arose which caused the separation of the Portuguese and Catalan Jews from the Castilians. Toward the end of his second year in Avlona a quarrel broke out among the Sephardim and the Portuguese. Leon, who sided with the Portuguese, had for antagonists Abraham Ḥarbon and Abraham de Collier. Excommunications were launched by both parties even on the Day of Atonement, before the Sephardim finally relented. Some time later R. David returned to Salonica, where he died whilst still writing his last book.

== Works ==
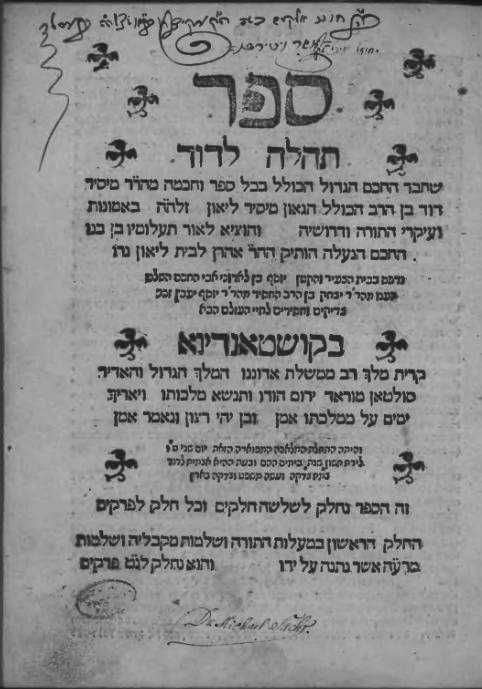
Title page of the 1577 Tehillah le-Dawid written in Italy and printed in Constantinople

Leon was a prolific writer, and produced works in many branches of secular science, as well as on distinctively Jewish subjects. With the exception of two, all remained unpublished. Most of them are no longer extant, and are known only from quotations. Leon preferred to clothe his philosophy in the garb of the Kabbalah, in which he was an adept; but he was too much of a philosopher to become involved in the abysses of mysticism. In his kabbalistic work Magen David, still extant in manuscript, he freely quotes the Greek and the Arabic philosophers. For him Plato was the greatest kabbalist. This philosopher, Leon claimed, lived at the time of the prophet Jeremiah, who was his teacher.

David was the author of Shevah ha-Nashim, composed in Constantinople in 1497, in which he defends the humanities, such as classical literature, grammar, history, philosophy, rhetoric, and poetry, arguing that they do not negate rabbinic scholarship but rather complement the pursuit of wisdom and halachic observance. His defense of Jewish humanism argues that becoming a Jewish Renaissance man was a necessity for rabbis to improve as scholars, become closer to the religious ideal, and serve their communities. It still extant in manuscript (according to Steinschneider, "Hebr. Bibl." xix.83, identical with the commentary on Proverbs 31);

Leon wrote also the following works:

- Abir Ya'aḳob, on medicine and other sciences;
- Sefer ha-Derashot, sermons arranged in the order of the sections of the Torah (according to Neubauer, it is identical with the Tif'eret Adam quoted in Leon's commentary on Lamentations);
- Menorat ha-Zahab, also extant in manuscript, probably a haggadic commentary on Lamentations;
- Ein ha-Kore, a commentary on the Moreh Nebukim, criticizing the commentary of Isaac Abravanel;
- Miktam le-Dawid, a kabbalistic work mentioned in the Ein ha-Kore;
- Sod ha-Gemul, in which he shows that the Israelites, unlike other nations, are not under a special sign of the zodiac;
- refutations of Albo's criticisms of Aristotle;
- Tehillah le-Dawid (published by the author's grandson Aaron le-Bet David, Constantinople, 1577), in three parts: (1) on the excellence of the Law (divided into 59 chapters); (2) on the elements of faith, which latter is superior to speculative reasoning (divided into 65 chapters); (3) on the principles of God, the divine attributes, providence, free will, etc. (divided into 39 chapters). The final chapter was left incomplete, as David ben Judah Messer Leon died during the process of writing.
- a halakic decision on the ritual question which caused the division of the various congregations of Avlona, published by S. Bernfeld, under the title Kebod Ḥakamim, Berlin, 1899 (Meḳiẓe Nirdamim).

Leon was considered as a high Talmudic authority, and was consulted on halakhic questions. Two of his decisions have been preserved. In one of his works Leon mentions a commentary of his own on Moses of Coucy's Sefer Mitzvot Gadol ("Semag"). Parma MS. de Rossi No. 1395 contains a scientific treatise by Leon. In the introduction to this treatise Leon says that he wrote many poems in Hebrew and in the "Christian language," meaning thereby Latin or Italian. Shabbethai Bass, without indicating any source, gives, in his Sifte Yeshenim, the following titles of works attributed to Leon: Beit David; Kisse David; Nefesh David; Ḳol Adonai ba-Koaḥ; and Naḥal Adanim.
