= Nissim of Gerona =

14th-century Talmudist and authority on Jewish law

Nissim ben Reuven (1290 – 9th of Shevat, 1376, Hebrew: נִסִּים בֶּן רְאוּבֵן) of Girona, Catalonia was an influential talmudist and authority on Jewish law. He was one of the last of the great Spanish medieval Talmudic scholars. He is also known by his Hebrew acronym, the RaN (ר״ן), or else with the definite article HaRaN (הר״ן), as well as by the name RaNbaR (רנב״ר), the Hebrew acronym of his full name, including his father's name, Reuven (ראובן), and also by Nissim Gerondi.

== Biography ==
Nissim was born in Barcelona, Catalonia. He was a physician and had knowledge of astronomy. His teacher is not known; his works refer to a R. Perez as morenu ("our teacher"), but as he refers to his father (Reuben ben Nissim) as "my father and teacher" perhaps his father was his primary teacher.

He served as a judge and teacher for the Jewish community in Barcelona, and founded a yeshiva there. He criticized the wealthy members of the community for their behavior, but this provoked a hostile backlash from them. He suffered at the hands of certain wealthy and powerful Jews of his community, who even slandered him and other leading rabbis before the government, and they were even imprisoned for a period of five months before their innocence was proven. When the Spanish Jews combined to send a petition to the king entreating his protection, Nissim was one of the committee who drafted the document.

His closest students were the Isaac ben Sheshet and Hasdai Crescas.

== Scholarship ==
=== Commentary on Alfasi ===
His best-known work is his commentary and explanation of Isaac Alfasi's Sefer Ha-halachot, which had, at that time, been adopted for practical decisions. He is very detailed and explicit where the subject is important from a practical point of view, but extremely brief when dealing with theory. Ran did not write the commentary on all of Alfasi, although the whole commentary is often ascribed to him.

In his comments he did not hesitate to refute the greatest earlier authorities, such as Rashi, Rabbenu Tam, Maimonides, Nachmanides, and Solomon ben Aderet. However, he showed his reverence for these teachers by adopting their opinions in practise. Frequently, he would refute the opinion of an earlier teacher but then write: "Yet since the ancients have decided thus, their conclusions may not be set aside." According to his student Isaac ben Sheshet, he was generally very cautious in his decisions and inclined toward conservatism.

In his commentaries Nissim endeavored to establish the decisions relating to practise, and he devoted himself to the explanation and defense of Alfasi's "Halakot," since that compendium had been adopted for practical decisions. The extant commentaries of Nissim on the "Halakhot" cover the treatises Shabbat, Pesaḥim, Ta'anit, Rosh ha-Shanah, Beẓah, Sukkah, Megillah, Ketubot, Giṭṭin, Ḳiddushin, Shebu'ot, and Avodah Zarah. Commentaries on Mo'ed Katan and Makkot are erroneously ascribed to him. He is very detailed and explicit where the subject is important from a practical point of view, but extremely brief when dealing with matters of mere theory. The commentary is now printed with Alfasi in standard editions of the Talmud.

=== Commentary on the Talmud ===
Nissim also wrote commentaries on the Talmud itself. A scholarly edition of the surviving commentaries has been published in recent years. In these works also Nissim sought to determine the practical decisions, and at the end of nearly every exposition and explanation of any length he summed up whatever was of importance for practical purposes. He was the first to write a complete commentary on the treatise Nedarim; and this part of his work is the most valuable portion of the collection, since this treatise was neglected in the geonic period, and the later glosses on it left much to be desired.

=== Responsa ===
He was recognized as a rabbinical authority even beyond Spain, and rabbinical questions ("she'elot") were addressed to him not only from his own country, but also from France, Italy, Africa, and the Land of Israel. He wrote in reply about 1,000 responsa, of which only 77 have been preserved. These show his insight and his rationalistic method of treating halakhic material. His responsa were first published at Rome (1546), and were reprinted at Constantinople (1548) and, in an enlarged form, at Cremona (1557).

=== Other works ===
He wrote a philosophical work containing twelve homilies ("derashot"), displaying in this small volume his familiarity with philosophy, especially with that of Maimonides and Ibn Ezra. He was "no friend of mysticism", and even reproved Nahmanides for devoting too much time to the Kabbalah.

He also wrote a recently published commentary on the Bible, and a work of philosophy.
