= Schweipolt Fiol =

German printer

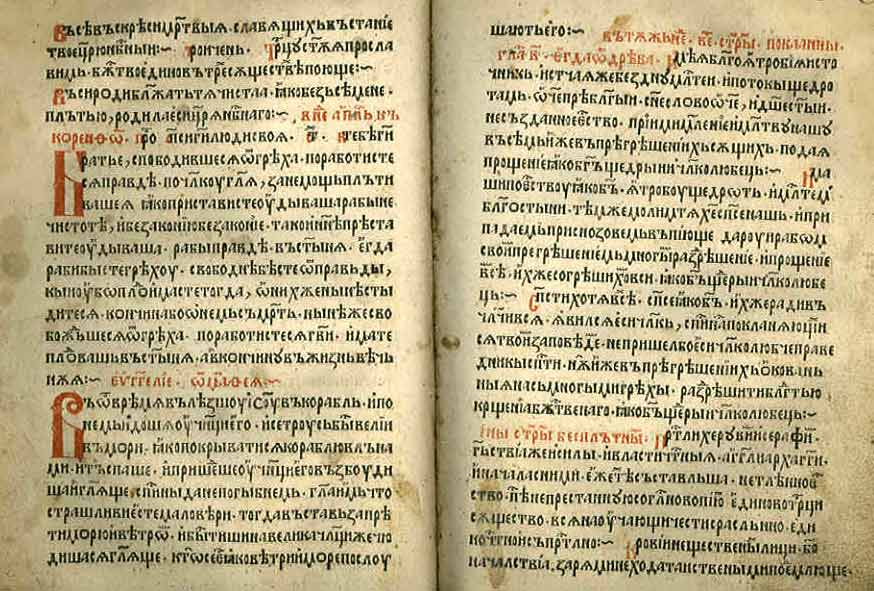
Fiol's Octoechos

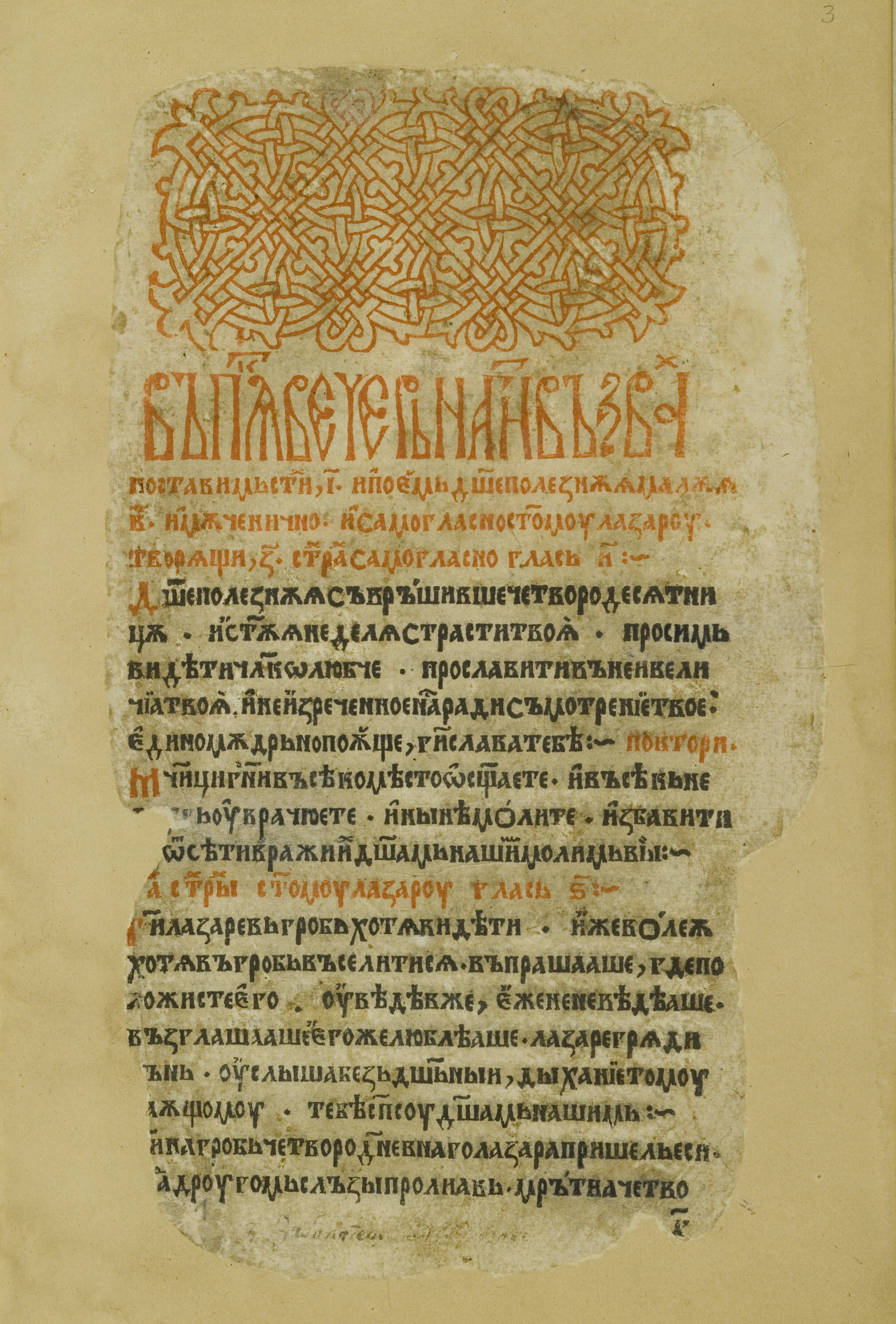
Triod cvĕtnaă (before 1491)

Schweipolt Fiol (also Sebald Vehl or Veyl; c. 1460 – 1525 or 1526) was a German-born 15th century pioneer of Cyrillic printing. Fiol spent a considerable part of his life in Poland, particularly Kraków, the capital of the Polish Kingdom at the time. The city was famous for its university. The burgeoning of the arts and sciences contributed to the early emergence of book printing here: as early as 1473–1477 there was a print shop in Kraków, which published numerous theological works. The very first book printed in Cyrillic script, Oktoikh (Octoechos), was published by Fiol in 1491 in Kraków.

Fiol worked as a mining engineer and jeweler, and then took over a print shop. It is this print shop, owned by Fiol, which first published in Cyrillic such religious books as Eastern Slavic editions of Horologion, Octoechos, and the two Triodi.

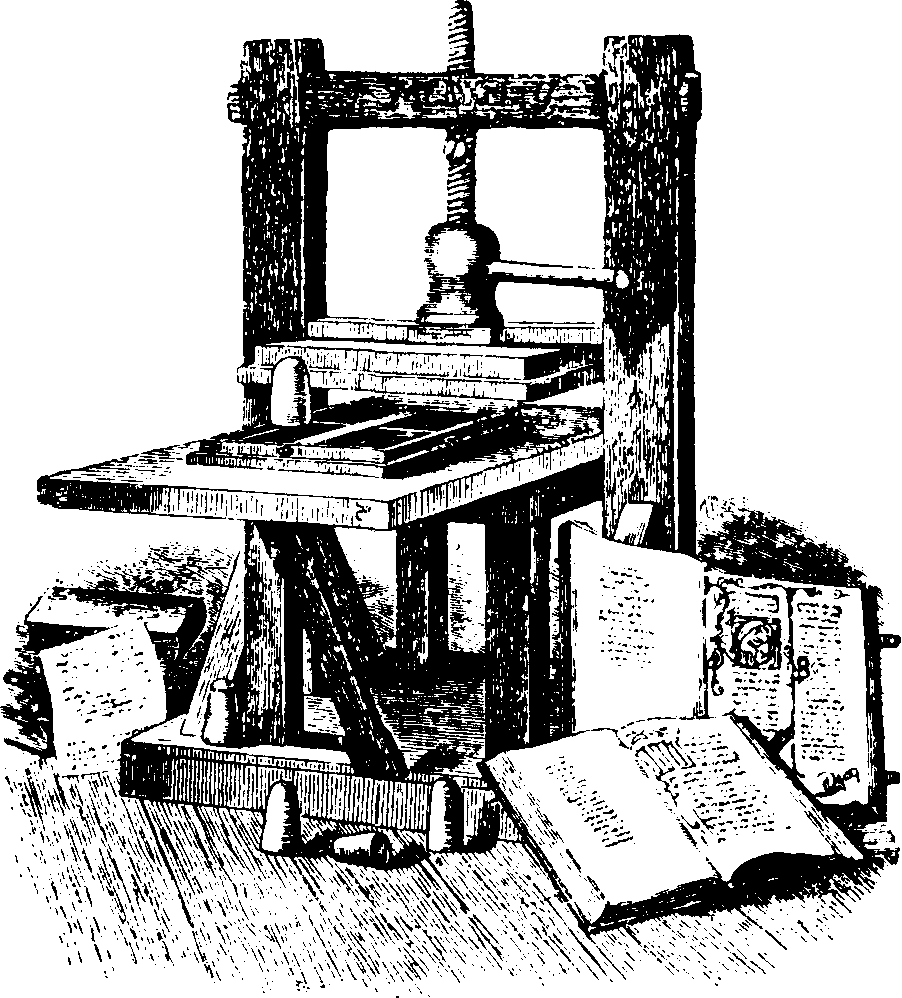
Printing machine created by Johannes Gutenberg, which had been used by Fiol

== Biography ==
The exact date of his birth is unknown. He was born in Neustadt an der Aisch in Franconia. He moved to Kraków in 1479 and was soon enrolled in a department of Goldsmiths. He worked as a gold embroiderer (German: perlenhaftir).

On March 9, 1489, the King of Poland and Grand Duke of Lithuania Casimir issued Fiol the privilege to the invention of a machine for pumping water from mines. The invention has been under interest of a wealthy merchant and banker John Thurzo (1437–1508), who owned a number of mines, including the lead mines in Olkusz. Subsequently, Thurzo, with the Kraków patrician Jan Teshnarom had sponsored Fiol's printing house. To start printing it was necessary to cut out the appropriate Cyrillic script.

On October 26, 1489 Fiol signed a contract with Karbesom Jacob, who pledged to "engrave letters and adjust font Russian." At the same time, he went to Nuremberg, probably in order to make punches and matrices for the subsequent embossing.

Documentary evidence about Fiol referred to on September 18, 1490: Fiol accused Johann and Nikolaus Svedlera of Neuburg of the theft of paper kept in his workshop in Kraków. Later, in turn, they filed for Fiola to court for libel. However, evidences was not provided by Fiol, but he said he saw the theft with his own eyes. The court's decision in this case was unknown.

The final version of the Cyrillic script and some of the letters commissioned by Fiol was cut out by student of Kraków University, Rudolf Borsdorf from Braunschweig who quickly supplied Fiol with 230 completely finished and adjusted letters and superscript icons (Ludolfus Ludolfi de Brunszwyczk).

We also know that Rudolph pledged not to make such fonts for anyone else, even for himself, and not teach how to make them, as Fiol did not want to let someone else print Church Slavonic books.

Famous German poet and humanist Conrad Celtis, lived in the years 1489–1491 in Kraków, and in his works, supported Fiols' publishing. In July 1491 Fiol pleaded with Mr. Otto for money.

His printing of Eastern Slavic Orthodox books led him into conflict with the Catholic Church authorities in Kraków. The book printer was arrested at the start of November 1491 under a fabricated charge of Hussite heresy. He was released on November 21, with a bail of 1000 gulden and a guaranty by two affluent Kraków citizens. He was arrested again in the beginning of 1492.

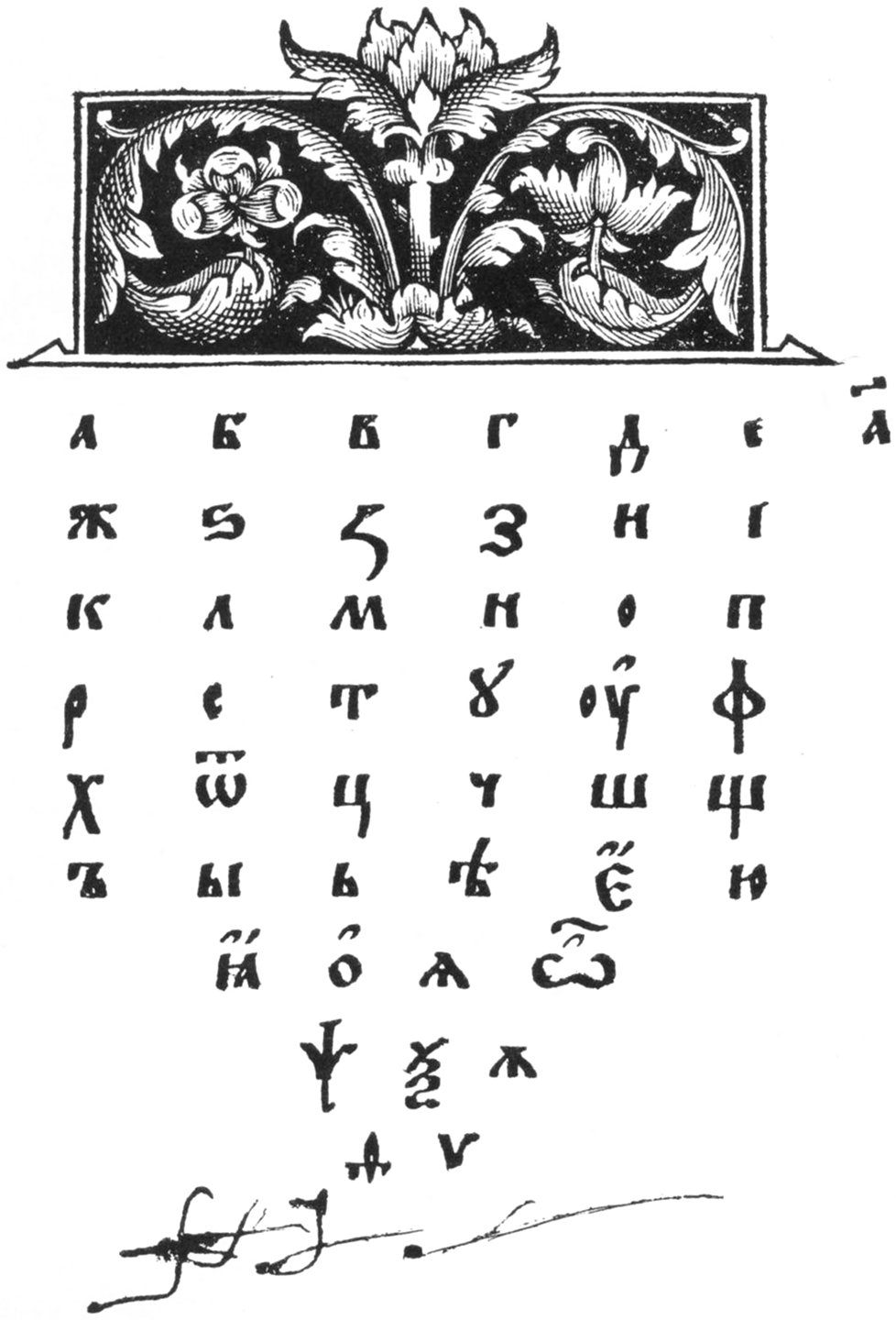
First Slavonic script

On January 13, 1492, the Archbishop of Gniezno had recommended him to refrain from sharing and printing Ruthenian books. Fiol was released in June 1492. He was found not guilty, but had to sign a document stating that he would cease his printing of Cyrillic books. Afterwards he discontinued his work as a printer and left Kraków.

From 1502 Fiol lived in Reichenstein, and later moved to the town of Levoca, where he was mining. In his last years he resided in Kraków, living on a pension granted to him by the Thurzo family. Schweipolt Fiol died at the end of 1525 or early 1526.

Fiol was married to a Polish woman, Małgorzata, the eldest daughter of a Kraków butcher Mikołaj Lubczyca. Since Małgorzata is not mentioned in the will from May 7, 1525, we can assume that either she died before or at this point, they were divorced.

== Printing in Poland ==
Printing in Poland began in the late 15th century, when following the creation of the Gutenberg Bible in 1455, printers from Western Europe spread the new craft abroad.

The Polish capital at the time was in Kraków, where scholars, artists and merchants from Western Europe had already been present. Other cities which were part of the Polish kingdom followed later. Cities of northern Polish province of Royal Prussia, like the Hanseatic League city of Danzig (Gdańsk), had established printing houses early on.

The first printing shop was possibly opened in Kraków by Augsburg-based Günther Zainer in 1465. In 1491, Schweipolt Fiol printed the first book in Cyrillic script. The next recorded printing shop was a Dutch one known by the name Typographus Sermonum Papae Leonis I. that might have been established in 1473 on Polish territory, but its exact location has yet to be determined.

The oldest known print from Poland is considered to be the Almanach cracoviense ad annum 1474 (Cracovian Almanac for the Year 1474) which is a single-sheet astronomical wall calendar for the year 1474 printed and published in 1473 by Kasper Straube. The only surviving copy of the Almanach cracoviense measures 37 cm by 26.2 cm, and is in the collection of the Jagiellonian University.

Other well known early printers in Poland were:

- Hieronymus Vietor from Silesia who worked in Vienna and Kraków
- Printers from the Szafenberg family
- Florian Ungler

In the late 16th century there were 7 printing shops in Kraków, and in 1610 ten printing shops. A decline started in around 1615 leaving only three secular printing shops in 1650, accompanied by a few ecclesial ones.

Only one printing shop is recorded in Warsaw in 1707, owned by the Piarists. This situation improved during the realm of the last Polish king, Stanisław August Poniatowski, which marked a political and cultural revival in Poland. Unfortunately his attempts to reform the state led to the Partitions of Poland carried out by Prussia, Austria and Russia.

== Printing technology ==
The world's first movable type printing technology was invented and developed in China by the Han Chinese printer Bi Sheng between the years 1041 and 1048. In the West, the invention of an improved movable type mechanical printing technology in Europe is credited to the German printer Johannes Gutenberg in 1450.

The exact date of Gutenberg's press is debated based on existing screw presses. Gutenberg, a goldsmith by profession, developed a printing system by both adapting existing technologies and making inventions of his own. His newly devised hand mould made possible the rapid creation of metal movable type in large quantities Johannes Gutenberg's work on the printing press began in approximately 1436 when he partnered with Andreas Dritzehn—a man he had previously instructed in gem-cutting—and Andreas Heilmann, owner of a paper mill. However, it was not until a 1439 lawsuit against Gutenberg that an official record exists; witnesses' testimony discussed Gutenberg's types, an inventory of metals (including lead), and his type molds.

Having previously worked as a professional goldsmith, Gutenberg made skillful use of the knowledge of metals he had learned as a craftsman. He was the first to make type from an alloy of lead, tin, and antimony, which was critical for producing durable type that produced high-quality printed books and proved to be much better suited for printing than all other known materials. To create these lead types, Gutenberg used what is considered one of his most ingenious inventions, [38] a special matrix enabling the quick and precise molding of new type blocks from a uniform template. His type case is estimated to have contained around 290 separate letter boxes, most of which were required for special characters, ligatures, punctuation marks, etc.

Gutenberg is also credited with the introduction of an oil-based ink which was more durable than the previously used water-based inks. As printing material he used both paper and vellum (high-quality parchment). In the Gutenberg Bible, Gutenberg made a trial of coloured printing for a few of the page headings, present only in some copies.

A later work, the Mainz Psalter of 1453, presumably designed by Gutenberg but published under the imprint of his successors Johann Fust and Peter Schöffer, had elaborate red and blue printed initials.

== Publishing activities ==
It happened that the Eastern Slavic Cyrillic printing house was founded not on the territory of one of Eastern Slavic countries, and in the capital and the largest economic center of the then Kingdom of Poland - Kraków, which at that time was home to many Ukrainian and Belarusians. There at the end of the 15th century, came the first four books printed in Cyrillic Church Slavonic. Two of them - the Book of Hours and Osmoglasnik (Octoechos) - are marked on the end-of-print in Crakow in 1491 by Schweipolt Fiol. Thus, the printed script Lenten Triodion (in one of its copies, it is not output) and Pentecostarion (the page with the symbol names Fiol is preserved only in the copy that was recently discovered in the city of Brașov).

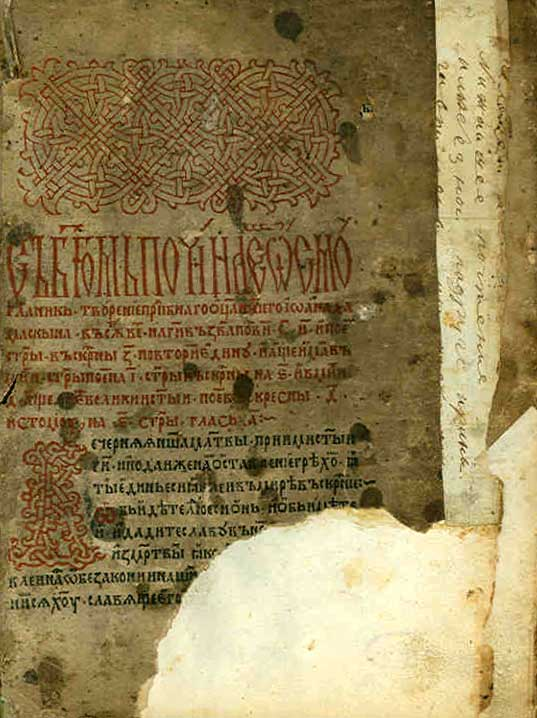
The first page of Octoechos

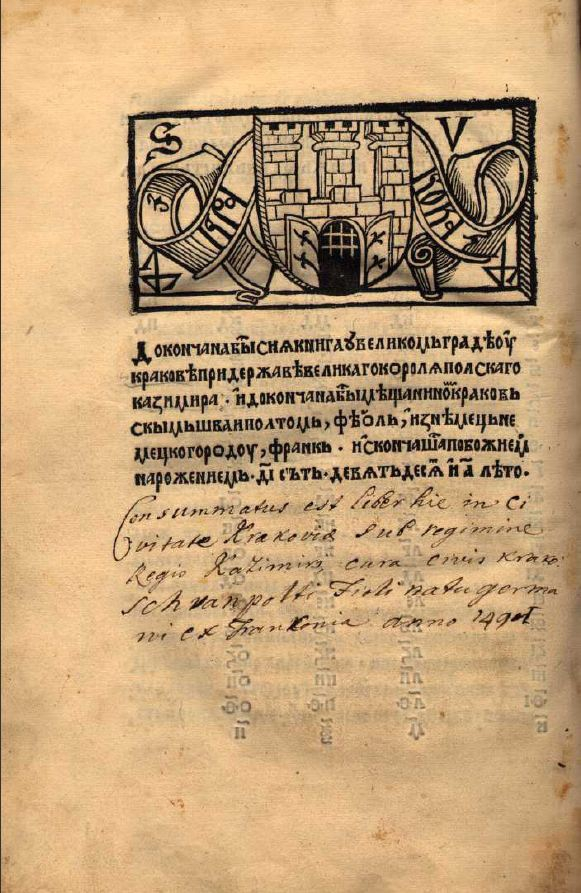
The last page of Octoechos. Visible on the top picture are two capital letter from both sides "S" and "V", that could be mean Schweipolt Viol

Scientists assume that customers, who ordered printing liturgical texts, have been associated with the Metropolitan of Kiev and all Rus' or one of its dioceses. Experts believe that the model for the (very modest) designs of these publications were Slavic manuscripts, particularly from Carpathian churches.

== Books ==
In total, Fiol published four editions of Church Slavonic books in Fiol's printing house in Kraków:

- "Octoechos" (Osmoglasnik, 1491)
- "Book of Hours" (1491)
- "Lenten Triodion" (1492–1493)
- "Pentecostarion" (unknown)

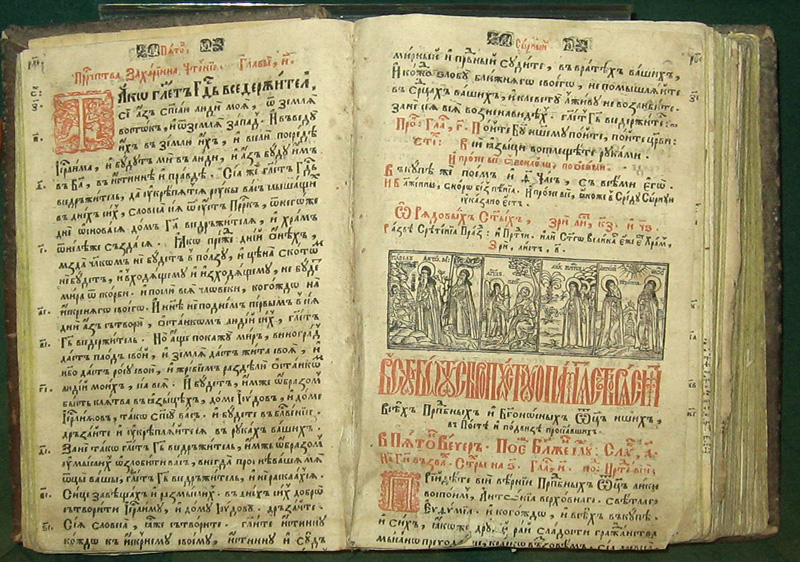
Unfortunately, there isn't picture of Fiol's "Lenten Triodion, this is another one, printed by Peter Mogila in 1646

"Octoechos" and "Book of Hours" has the following colophon, in which the text is typed without spaces, making it difficult to understand and produced several variants of its interpretation. For example, this lack of clarity has allowed the Polish literary critic K. Estrayher to say that publishers could be two people: the Slav Sviatopolk and a German, a native franc.

Once documents found to reside in 1478–1499 in Kraków, Fiol, who called himself franc, this reading has lost all meaning. In the Ukrainian historiography, still Fiol called Sviatopolk of Lemko, of which there is no documentary evidence.

"Octoechos" printed in the format in folio, made in the technique of two-color printing, and is made up of twenty two 8-sheet notebooks. The last 3 sheets are blank, with 172 total pages. Some of the pages are decorated with complex patterns, in the beginning of each chapter, capital letters are painted with vermilion, decorated with a modest ornament. On the second page of the book before the start of the text displayed under a braided headband is a braided initial. In addition, incunabula contains 12 lines and simple tie in drawing, small in terms of size, the initials of pawn shops.

In "Pentecostarion" there is no colophon, but there is typographical Fiol mark. Anonymous printed in the same font of "Lenten Triodion." 28 preserved copies of "Pentecostarion", of which at least 4 are complete. "Pentecostarion" consists of 366 pages, the most complete specimen was found in October 1971 in the church of St. Nicholas Schei and is at the Museum of Romanian culture in Brasov (Romania), only 21 have survived.

== See also ==
- Božidar Vuković
- Đurađ Crnojević
- Francysk Skaryna
- Stefan Marinović
- Hieromonk Makarije
- Hieromonk Mardarije
- Hegumen Mardarije
- Vićenco Vuković
- Hieromonk Pahomije
- Trojan Gundulić
- Andrija Paltašić
- Jakov of Kamena Reka
- Coresi
- Bartolomeo Ginammi who followed Zagurović's footsteps reprinting Serbian books.
- Dimitrije Ljubavić, Božidar Goraždanin's grandson
- Inok Sava
- Stefan Paštrović
- Jovan Maleševac
- Symon Budny
- Primož Trubar
- Ivan Fedorov
- Spread of the printing press

== Sources ==
- Norman Davies, God's Playground: A History of Poland: in Two Volumes, p. 118
- Szwejkowska H., Książka drukowana XV - XVIII wieku. Zarys historyczny, Wyd. 3 popr., PWN Wrocław; Warsaw 1980.
- Wiener allgemeine Literatur-Zeitung, Dritter Jahrgang, 1815
- (in Russian) Про обставини видання кириличних першодруків див.: Грушевський М. Історія української літератури, т. 5, pp. 129–138; Немировский Е.Л. Начало славянского книгопечатания, Москва 1971.
- (in Russian) Немировский Е. Л. Начало славянского книгопечатания. М., 1971.
- (in Russian) Немировский Е. Л. Описание изданий типографии Швайпольта Фиоля // Описание старопечатных изданий кирилловского шрифта. М., 1979.
- (in Russian) Немировский Е. Л. Начало славянского книгопечатания кирилловским шрифтом // Книга: исследования и материалы. М., 1991. Сб. 63.
