= Coresi =

Romanian printer (died 1583)

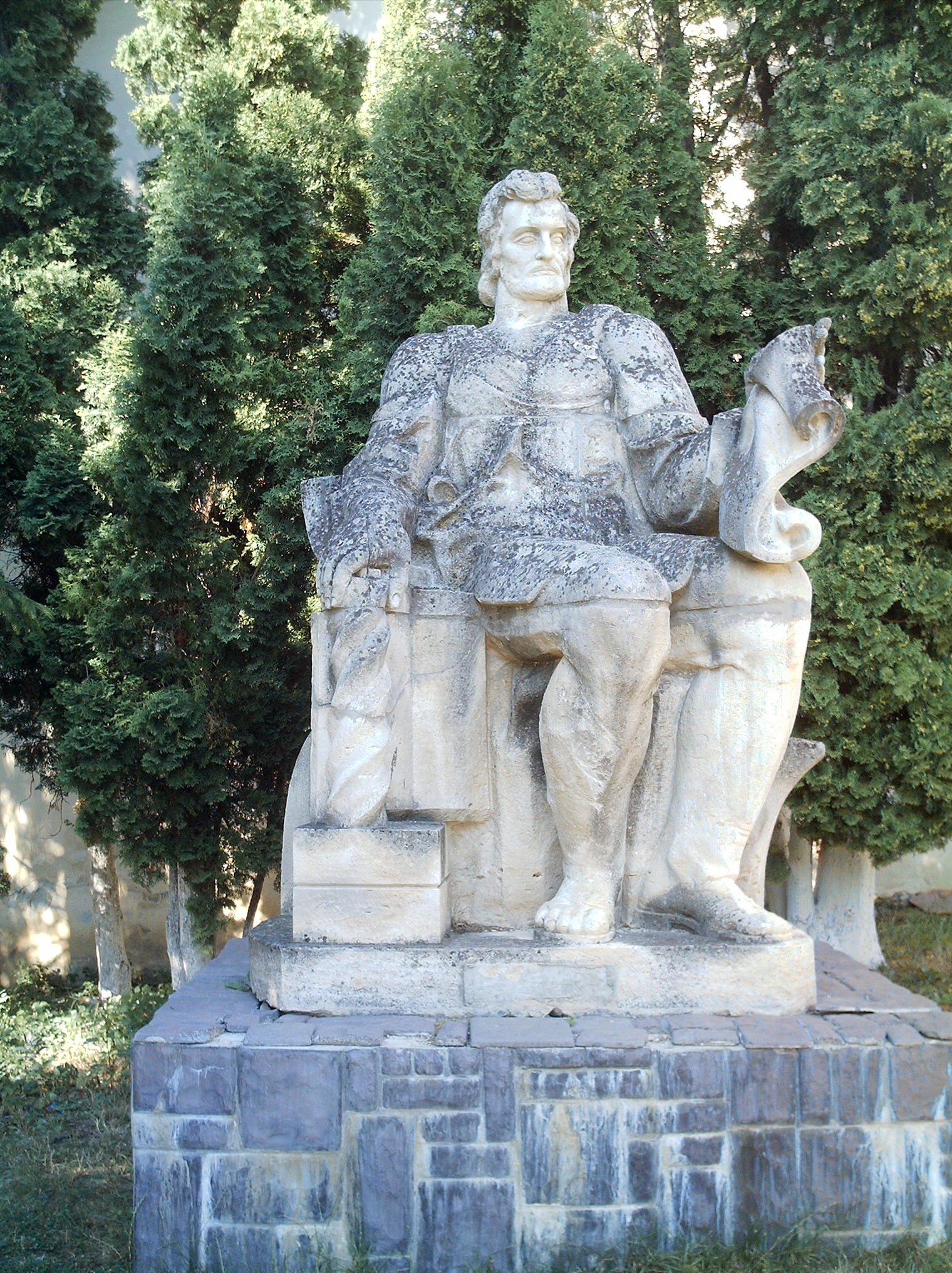
Statue of Coresi, next to St. Nicholas Church, Brașov

Coresi (also known as Deacon Coresi; d. 1583, Brașov) was one of the first Romanian printers of the sixteenth century. He was the editor of some of the earliest printed books in the Romanian language.

== Biography ==
Very little is known about his life, including the year of his birth and the date of his death. He was most likely from Târgoviște and practiced printing in the same city under the guidance of Moise the Monk and Dimitrije Ljubavić who were working for the Metropolis of Ungro-Wallachia. He moved to Brașov in 1559, where he started printing books not only in Church Slavonic, but also in Romanian. The epithet deacon was interpreted as meaning "minor writer of Slavonic language in a chancery", yet it is more likely he was an actual deacon of the Eastern Orthodox Church

During his activity he printed approximately 35 book titles. His activity was not limited to a single religious group, his works having Calvinist, Lutheran, or Orthodox patronage.

== List of books printed by Coresi ==
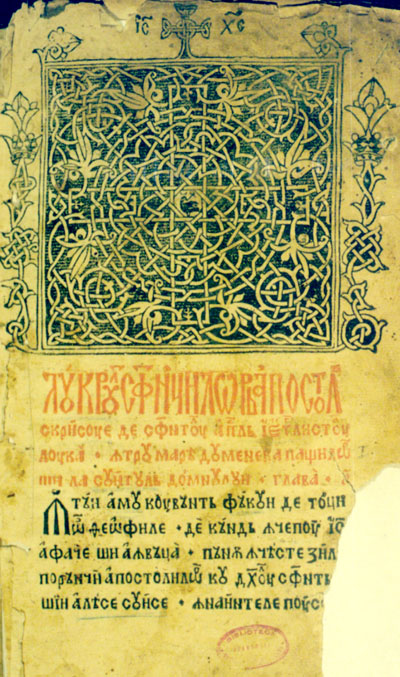
"Apostol" (in Romanian) by Coresi, 1563

Coresi printed 10 books in Romanian:

- Întrebare creștinească ("Christian Question") [1560]
- Catehismul ("Catechism") [1560]
- Tetraevanghel ("Tetraevangelion") [1561]
- Pravila Sfinților Apostoli or a Sfinților Părinți ("Pravila or the Nomocanon of the Holy Apostles or of the Holy Fathers") [1560-1562]
- Lucrul apostolesc ("The Apostolic Work") [1566]
- Tâlcul Evangheliilor ("The Interpretation of the Gospels") [1567-1568]
- Molitevnic rumânesc ("Romanian Euchologion") [1567-1568]
- Psaltire ("Psalter") [1568, 1570]
- Liturghierul ("Hieratikon") [1570]
- Evanghelia învățătoare ("The Teaching or Didactic Gospel") [1581]
- Evanghelia cu învățătură ("The Gospel with teaching") [1581]
- Cazania II ("Kazania or Homiliary II") [1581]

== See also ==
- First Romanian School
- Bible translations into Romanian
- Schweipolt Fiol
- Francysk Skaryna
- Đurađ Crnojević
- Stefan Marinović
- Hieromonk Makarije
- Hieromonk Mardarije
- Hegumen Mardarije
- Vićenco Vuković
- Hieromonk Pahomije
- Trojan Gundulić
- Andrija Paltašić
- Jakov of Kamena Reka
