= Jerolim Zagurović =

Serbian-Venetian printer

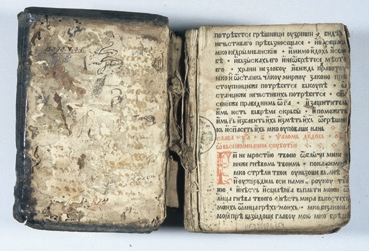
- Psalter with book of hours, published by Zagurović in 1569
- Born: 1550; Kotor, Venetian Republic (today Montenegro)
- Died: 1580 (aged 29–30)
- Other names: Girolamo Zagurovich
- Occupation: printer
- Known for: last printer of srbulje books
- Notable work: Psalter (1569); Prayer book (1570)
- Spouse(s): Antonija Crnojević; Marina Pellegrini
- Children: Anđelo (Angelo) Zagurović

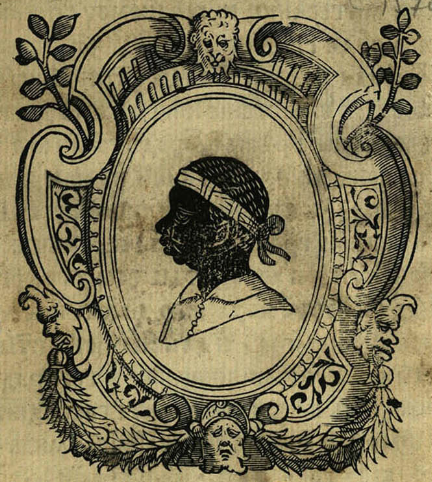
Coat of arms of Jerolim Zagurović

Jerolim Zagurović or Girolamo Zaguri ((Serbian: Јеролим Загуровић), Italian: Girolamo Zagurovich) (c. 1550—1580) was a Serbian-Venetian printer of Serbian Cyrillic books (srbulje). Zagurović and Vićenco Vuković were the last printers of srbulje books.

== Family ==
Zagurović was Serbian Catholic and member of the noble Zagurović family from Kotor, Republic of Venice (today Montenegro). His paternal uncle was distinguished poet Ilija Zagurović.

The Zagurović family was related to the Serbian Crnojević family through the marriage of Jerolim Zagurović and Antonija (Antonia) Crnojević, the daughter of Lord Đurađ Crnojević of Zeta (r. 1489–96). They had a son, Anđelo (Angelo) Zagurović, who lived in Venice.

After Antonia’s death, Jerolim (Girolamo) later married Marina Pellegrini, the sister of the celebrated jurist Vincenzo Pellegrini.

== Printing ==
The Crnojević printing house was disestablished when Đurađ Crnojević fled Zeta in 1496. The types used in his printing house remained in the monastery until Jerolim Zagurović found them somewhere before 1569. He wrote that he took some types to Venice. Because Jerolim insisted he brought types from Crnojević printing house to Venice, it was speculated that he had actually used Crnojević's types in his printing house. This was disputed by some later works which explained that the Crnojević printing house was so well reputed that other printing houses imitated its types.

In 1569 he founded a printing house in Venice and began printing Cyrillic books. One of the motives of Jerolim Zagurović to establish the printing house was to earn some profit from it to compensate losses of the Zagurović family business caused by frequent Ottoman sieges of Kotor. Zagurović did not have a formal theological education so he had to engage Jakov of Kamena Reka to edit and proofread the texts before printing. (Jakov belonged to the Serbian Orthodox Church).

In 1569 he printed a psalter and in 1570 a prayer book. This was the last Serbian Cyrillic book printed until the second half of the 18th century. There was only one book printed in 1638 in Venice by Bartholomew Ginami, but it was simply a reprint of the psalter with the book of hours published by Zagurović in 1569. Zagurović's printing press was firstly taken over by Jakov of Kamena Reka, and then in 1597 by Bartolomeo Ginammi who used it until 1638.

== See also ==
- Božidar Vuković
- Schweipolt Fiol
- Božidar Goraždanin
- Đurađ Crnojević
- Stefan Marinović
- Hieromonk Makarije
- Hieromonk Mardarije
- Hegumen Mardarije
- Vićenco Vuković
- Hieromonk Pahomije
- Trojan Gundulić
- Andrija Paltašić
- Jakov of Kamena Reka
- Dimitrije Ljubavić
- Teodor Račanin

== Sources ==
- Đuro Šurmin (1808). Povjest književnosti hrvatske i srpske. Tisak i naklada knjižare L. Hartmana, Kugli i Deutsch.
- Valentinelli, Giuseppe (1855). Bibliografia della Dalmazia e del Montenegro. Coi tipi del L. Gaj.
- Muzej primenjene umetnosti (1952). Rukopisna i štampana knjiga [Manuscript and printed book] (in Serbian). Belgrade, Serbia: Đorđe Sp Radojičić.
- Jurić, Šime (1956). Pregled povijesti knjižnica: s kratkim prikazom razvoja pisma i knjige. Kultura.
- sekcija, Društvo istoričara Crne Gore. Kotorska (1970). Kotorska sekcija Društva istoričara Crne Gore 1948-1968. Društvo istoričara Crne Gore.
- Jakić (1866). Priměri starohèrvatskoga jezika iz glagolskih i cirilskih knjževnih starinah: sastavljeni za sedmi i osmi gomnazijalni razred. Uvod i priměri starohrvatski. Jakić.
- Institut (1973). Istorijski zapisi: organ Istoriskog instituta i Društva istoričara SR Crne Gore. Istorijski institut u Titogradu.
- Društvo istoričara (1973). Istorijski zapisi: organ Istoriskog instituta i Društva istoričara SR Crne Gore (in Serbian). Istorijski institut u Titogradu.
- Bibliografi (1985). Susreti bibliografa ... (in Serbian). Narodna biblioteka "Dr Đorđe Natošević".
- Milović, Jevto M. (1986). Štamparska i književna djelatnost: radovi sa Naučnog skupa Titograd, 19. i 30. septembra 1983. Crnogorska akademija nauka i umjetnosti.
- Samardžić, Radovan (1993). Istorija srpskog naroda: pt. 1-2. Srbi pod tudinskom vlashdu 1537-1699. Srpska knjiiževna zadruga.
- Zadruga (1993). Istorija srpskog naroda: knj. Srbi pod tuđinskom vlašđu, 1537-1699 (2 v.). Srpska književna zadruga. ISBN 9788637904762.
- biblioteka (1985). Susreti bibliografa ... Narodna biblioteka "Dr Đorđe Natošević".
- Biblioteka, Matica Srpska (Novi Sad) (1995). Godǐsnjak Biblioteke Matice srpske za ... Biblioteka Matice srpske.
- (Greece), Hidryma Technologias kai Ereunas (2005). Provincial elites in the Ottoman Empire: Halcyon Days in Crete V : a symposium held in Rethymnon 10-12 January 2003. Crete University Press. ISBN 978-960-524-216-9.
- Ćirković, Sima (2004). The Serbs. Malden: Blackwell Publishing. ISBN 9781405142915.
