= Božidar Goraždanin =

Founder of the Goražde printing house

- Born: Божидар Љубавић; Goražde
- Died: 16th century
- Occupation: printer
- Known for: Establishing one of the earliest printing houses on the Balkans

Božidar Ljubavić, better known as Božidar Goraždanin (Božidar of Goražde), was founder of the Goražde printing house, the second Serbian language printing house and one of the earliest printing houses in the Balkans. Since 25 October 1519 he printed books on Cyrillic alphabet, first in Venice and then in the Church of Saint George in Sopotnica, Sanjak of Herzegovina, Ottoman Empire (today village in Novo Goražde, Republic of Srpska, Bosnia and Herzegovina) between 1519 and 1523. Only four printing presses were operational during the entire Ottoman period in Bosnia. The first press was press of Božidar Goraždanin while other three presses existed only in the 19th century. In 1523 his printing house became non-operational.

== Background ==
After the printing press was invented around 1450 by Johannes Gutenberg in Mainz, Germany, the art of book printing was soon introduced in other parts of Europe. By the end of the 15th century, Venice had become a major centre of printing. In 1493, Đurađ Crnojević, the ruler of the Principality of Zeta (in present-day Montenegro), sent Hieromonk Makarije to Venice to buy a press and learn the art of printing. At Cetinje, the capital of Zeta, Makarije printed in 1494 the Cetinje Octoechos, the first incunable written in the Serbian recension of Church Slavonic. The Crnojević printing house worked until 1496, when Zeta fell to the Ottomans. In some earlier works Božidar Goraždanin was misidentified with Božidar Vuković.

== Goražde printing house ==
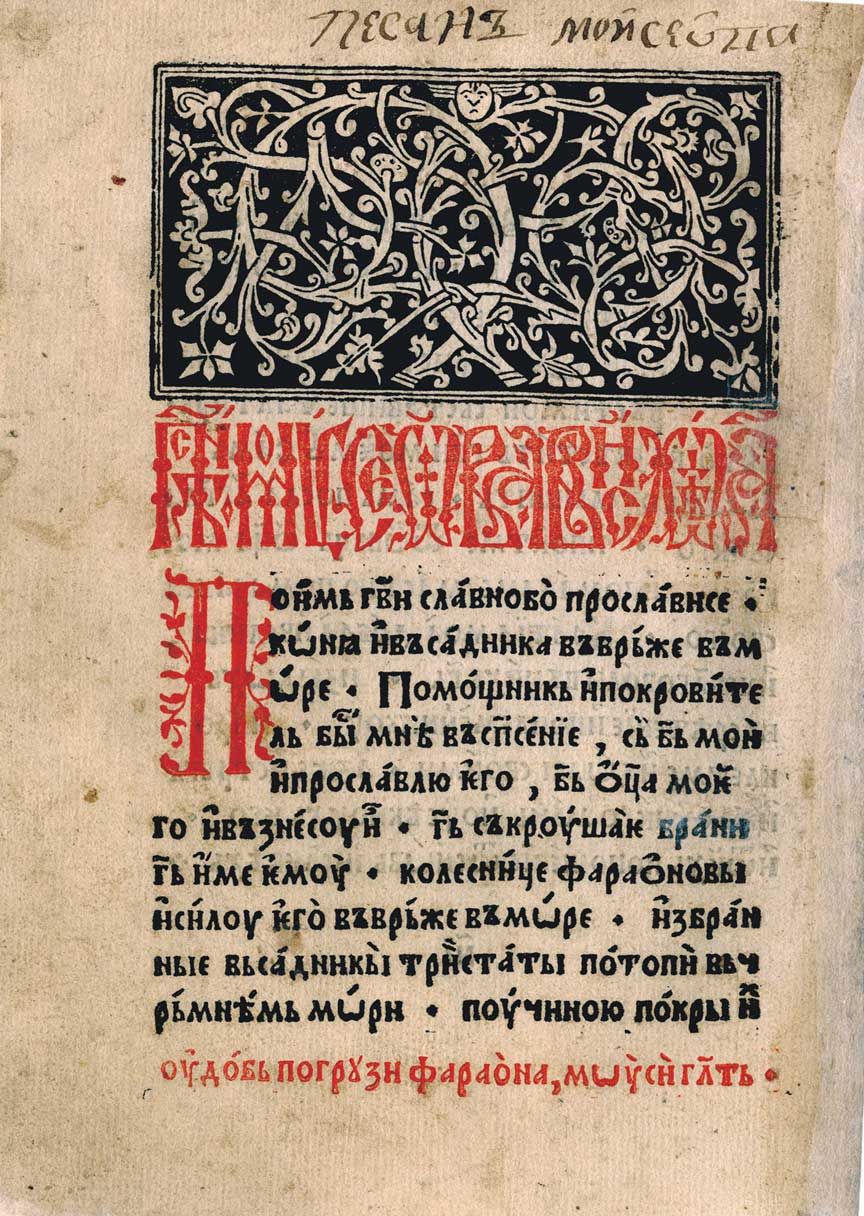
A page of the Goražde Psalter (1521)

In 1495 Božidar Ljubavić travelled to Venice for business purposes. In 1518, Božidar Ljubavić resided at the Mileševa Monastery, the see of a Serbian Orthodox diocese which had been part of the Kingdom of Bosnia since 1373. Mileševa and other parts of its diocese, including the town of Goražde, were located in the region of Herzegovina, which was gradually conquered by the Ottomans between 1465 and 1481.

In the second half of 1518, Božidar Ljubavić sent his sons, Đurađ and hieromonk Teodor, to Venice to buy a printing press and to learn the art of printing. The Ljubavić brothers procured a press and began printing a hieratikon (priest's service book), copies of which had been completed by 1 July 1519 either in Venice or at the Church of Saint George near Goražde. After Đurađ Ljubavić died in Venice on 2 March 1519, it is unclear whether his brother transported the press to Goražde before or after finishing the work on the hieratikon. Because members of Ljubavić family were from Goražde, they brought printing press to their hometown. At the Church of Saint George, Teodor organised the Goražde printing house, which produced, beside the hieratikon, two more books in Church Slavonic of the Serbian recension: a psalter in 1521, and a small euchologion in 1523. Books were printed by Božidar's grandson Dimitrije Ljubavić after being edited by hieromonk Teodor, his uncle. Dimitrije Ljubavić went on to found a printing press in 1545 in Târgoviște who was himself working for the Metropolitanate of Wallachia at the time. The first book printed in printing house of Božidar Goraždanin was Goražde Psalter (Serbian: Псалтнр са носледовадем и часловием), printed on 25 October 1521.

Božidar Ljubavić died suddenly on 2 March 1527.

== See also ==
- Božidar Vuković
- Đurađ Crnojević
- Stefan Marinović
- Hieromonk Makarije
- Hieromonk Mardarije
- Hegumen Mardarije
- Vićenco Vuković
- Hieromonk Pahomije
- Trojan Gundulić
- Andrija Paltašić
- Jakov of Kamena Reka
- Bartolomeo Ginammi who followed Zagurović's footsteps reprinting Serbian books.
- Dimitrije Ljubavić, Božidar Goraždanin's grandson
- Inok Sava
- Stefan Paštrović

== Sources ==
- Немировский, Евгений Львович; библиотека, Российская государственная (2009). Славянские издания кирилловского (церковнославянского) шрифта, 1421-2000: 1491-1550. Знак. ISBN 978-5-9551-0295-5.
- Suarez, Michael F., S.J.; Woudhuysen, H. R. (October 2013). The Book: A Global History. Oxford University Press. ISBN 978-0-19-967941-6.
- Barać, Dragan (2008). "Горажданска штампарија—прва међу штампаријама у Херцеговини и српским земљама 16. века". In Dragan Barać (ed.). Горажданска штампарија 1519–1523 [The Goražde Printing House 1519–1523] (in Serbian). Belgrade: National Library of Serbia; East Sarajevo: Philosophical Faculty of the University of East Sarajevo. ISBN 978-86-7035-186-8. Archived from the original on 2014-04-08.
- Savez, društava istoričara (1997). Jugoslovenski istorijski časopis. Savez društava istoričara Jugoslavije.
- Fine, John Van Antwerp (1994). The Late Medieval Balkans: A Critical Survey from the Late Twelfth Century to the Ottoman Conquest. Ann Arbor, Michigan: University of Michigan Press. ISBN 0-472-08260-4.
- Biblioteka, Matica srpska (Novi Sad, Serbia). (1994). Godïsnjak Biblioteke Matice srpske.
- Pregled (1984). Pregled.
- Bihalji-Merin, Oto (1978). Mala enciklopedija Prosveta: opšta enciklopedija. Prosveta.
- Matica (1974). Zbornik Matice srpske za književnost i jezik. Matica srpska.
- Ćirković, Sima (2004). The Serbs. Malden: Blackwell Publishing. ISBN 9781405142915.
