= Goražde Psalter =

1521 Serbian printed psalter

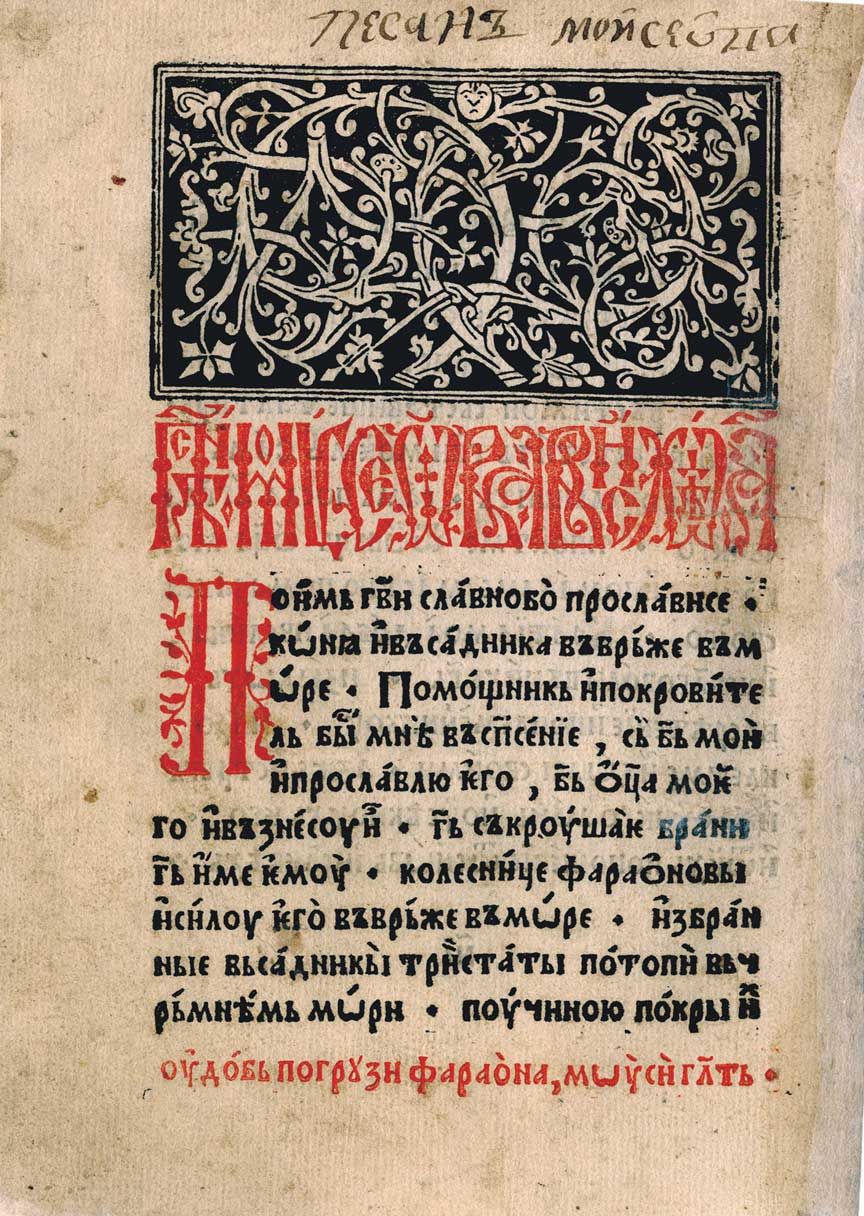
- Folio 137 verso, the beginning of the Canticles
- Editor: Teodor Ljubavić
- Original title: Ѱалтирь
- Language: Church Slavonic of the Serbian recension
- Subject: Psalms, Canticles, Horologion, Menologion, and other Orthodox religious texts
- Published: 1521 (Goražde printing house)
- Publication place: Sanjak of Herzegovina, Ottoman Empire
- Pages: 704

The Goražde Psalter (Serbian: Гораждански псалтир or Goraždanski psaltir) is a printed psalter published in 1521 in Church Slavonic of the Serbian recension. It is counted among the better accomplishments of early Serb printers. With its 352 leaves, it is the largest of the three books produced by the Goražde printing house—the first printing house in the territory of present-day Bosnia and Herzegovina. The production of the psalter was managed by Teodor Ljubavić, a hieromonk of the Mileševa Monastery.

Ten copies of the book are known to exist today; none is complete, though only the first and the last leaf are not present in any of them. The copies are kept in Belgrade (two), Kyiv, Krka Monastery, Lviv, Novi Sad, Patriarchate of Peć, Prague, Saint Petersburg, and Zagreb. The book is printed in uncial Cyrillic with elements of cursive, in the orthography of the Resava literary school. Beside the Psalms, it contains the Canticles, Horologion, Menologion, and other Orthodox religious texts. There are three additional texts, one of which describes the capture of Belgrade and the devastation of Syrmia by the Ottomans in 1521. The psalter is decorated with 4 headpieces, 149 initials, and ornamental headings, printed from woodcuts. It was first described in scholarly literature in 1836.

== Background ==
After the printing press was invented in the mid 15th century by Johannes Gutenberg and others, the art of book printing soon spread to other parts of Europe. By the end of the 15th century, Venice had become a major centre of printing. In 1493, Đurađ Crnojević, the ruler of the Principality of Zeta (in present-day Montenegro), sent hieromonk Makarije to Venice to buy a press and learn how to print books. In 1494, Makarije printed the Cetinje Octoechos at Zeta's capital, Cetinje. It was the first incunable written in the Serbian recension of Church Slavonic. The Crnojević printing house worked until 1496, when Zeta fell to the Ottoman Empire.

In the second half of 1518, brothers Teodor and Đurađ Ljubavić arrived in Venice to buy a press and learn the art of printing. They were sent on this mission by their father Božidar Ljubavić, also known as Božidar Goraždanin, a prominent merchant from the town of Goražde, which was then part of the Sanjak of Herzegovina, a district of the Ottoman Empire. Teodor was a hieromonk of the Mileševa Monastery, where his father also resided at that time. Mileševa was the see of a Serbian Orthodox diocese that was incorporated into the Kingdom of Bosnia in 1373. Goražde belonged to this diocese and was part of the region of Herzegovina, which was gradually conquered by the Ottomans between 1465 and 1481.

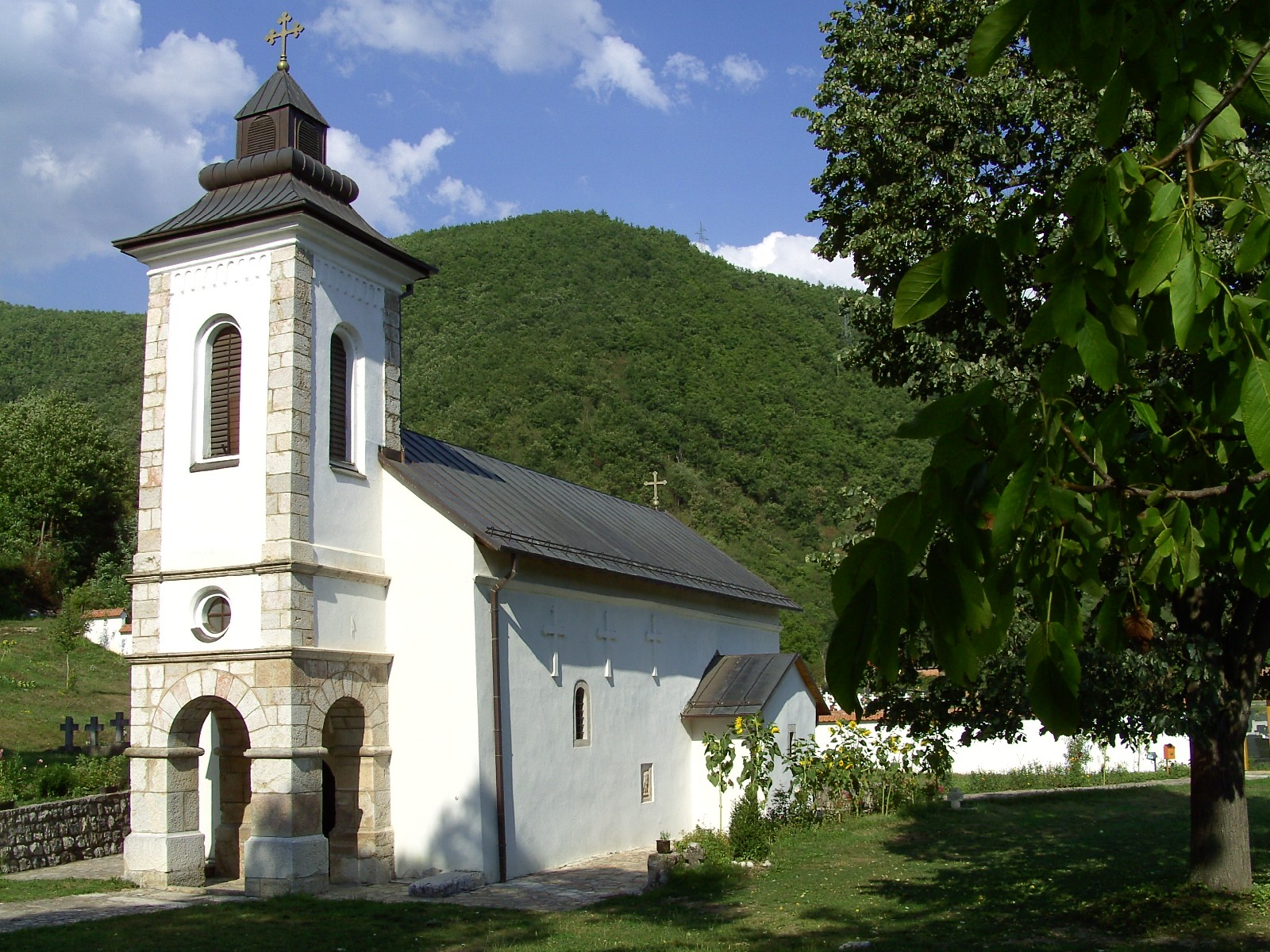
The Goražde Psalter was printed at the Church of Saint George in 1521

In Venice, the Ljubavić brothers procured a press and began printing a hieratikon (priest's service book), copies of which were finished on 1 July 1519 either in Venice or at the Church of Saint George in the village of Sopotnica near Goražde. After Đurađ Ljubavić died in Venice on 2 March 1519, it is unclear whether his brother transported the press to Goražde before or after finishing the work on the hieratikon. At the Church of Saint George, Teodor organised the Goražde printing house, one of the earliest printing houses among the Serbs, and the first such facility in the territory of present-day Bosnia and Herzegovina. The printing house was run by Božidar Goraždanin, who, in 1521, instructed Teodor (Ljubavić) to print a psalter. Teodor managed the work, which included the redaction of the psalter's text, the design and carving of the decorative woodcuts, typesetting, preparation of ink and paper, printing, drying and gathering of the printed sheets, and other tasks; the books were not bound at the printing house. The copies of the Goražde Psalter were finished on 25 October 1521.

== Description ==
The Goražde Psalter, ten copies of which are known to exist today, is counted among the better accomplishments of early Serb printers. The book contains 352 paper leaves in the quarto format, and its original size was probably 225 by 170 millimetres. Each of the preserved copies was trimmed at some point, the largest of them now measures 205 by 140 millimetres. None of the copies is complete, but only the first and the last leaf are not present in any of them. A transcription of the last leaf from a copy that belonged to the Krka Monastery was published in a Slavist journal in 1901.

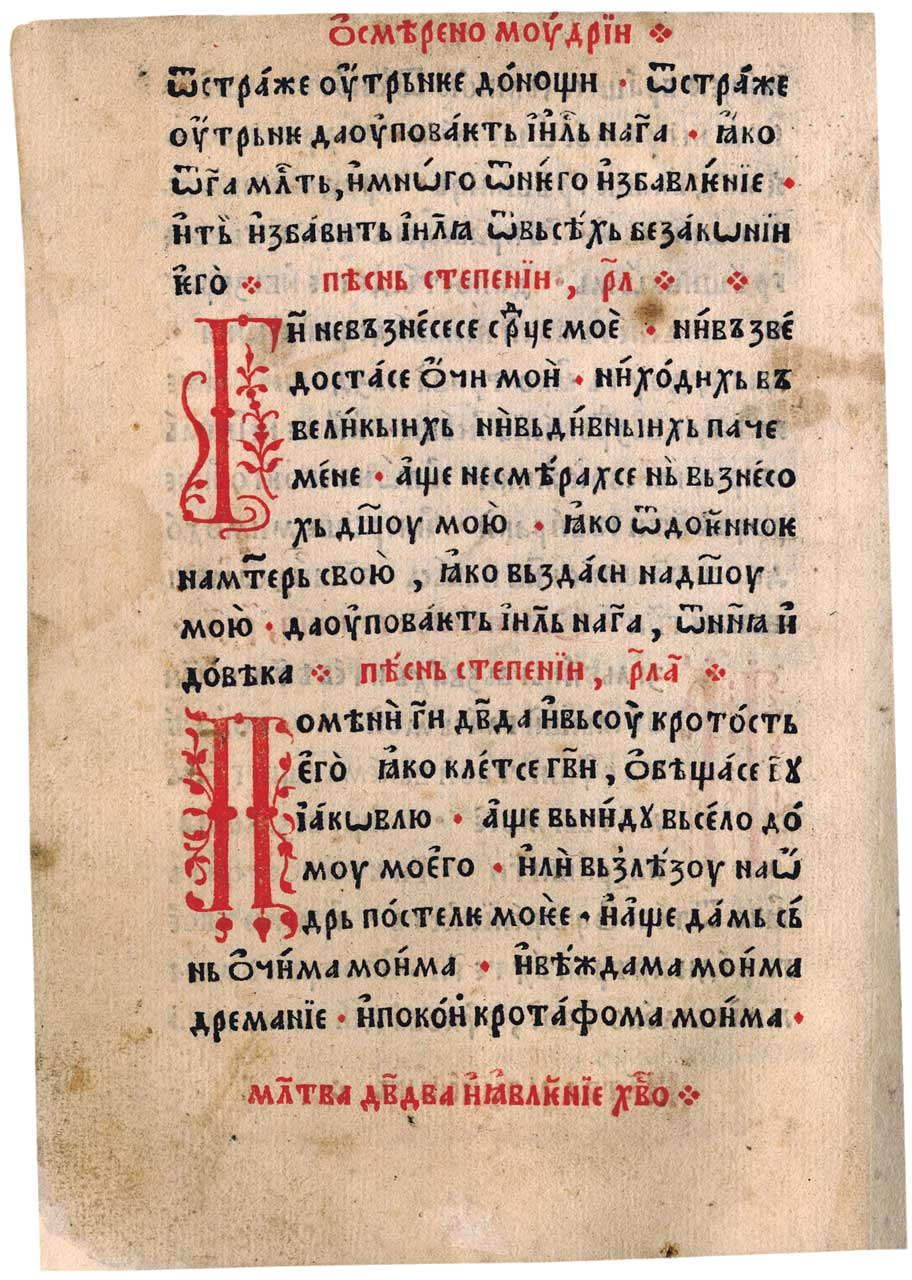
Folio 124 verso, Psalm 130 and Psalm 131:1–4 (in the Septuagint numbering)

The psalter is written in Church Slavonic of the Serbian recension, the medieval literary language of the Serbs. The book's text contains no vernacular or dialectal traces, as can be found in some Serbian manuscripts. The Cyrillic orthography used in the psalter mostly adheres to the norms of the Resava literary school, which developed in the last quarter of the 14th century and the first decades of the 15th century. The Resava orthography became dominant in Serbian literature, but it never fully ousted the rules of the older Raška literary school. The usage of the Raška orthography in the Goražde Psalter is comparable with that in the Crnojević Psalter published in Cetinje in 1495, though there are also notable differences between the two books. The former uses both yers, ъ and ь, as prescribed by the Resava school, while the latter uses only ь.

The Goražde Psalter begins with an introduction occupying the first ten leaves, which is followed by the Psalms (folios 11r–137r), the Canticles (137v–149v), Horologion (150r–189r), Menologion (189v–265v), the Rules of Fasting (266r–303r), a text about the Catholics ("On Franks and Other Such Anathemas", 303r–304r), the Paraklesis and Akathist to the Theotokos (305r–326r), the Paraklesis to Saint Nicholas (326v–334v), the Service on Holy Saturday (334v–350v), three additional texts (350v–352v), and the colophon (352v). In the first addition, Teodor Ljubavić, the editor of the book, reports that he found the texts on the Great Fast and on the Franks in the Hilandar Monastery on Mount Athos. The second addition is a short chronology from Adam to Stefan Uroš V, the last Serbian Emperor (1355–1371). The third addition describes the capture of Belgrade and the devastation of Syrmia by the Ottomans in 1521:

вь лѣто ҂з҃.к҃.ѳ҃. Сїѥ лѣто паде Соултань соулеимень на рѣкоу Савоу сь множьством измаилтень и прѣхождахоу рѣкоу Савоу ꙗкоже по соухоу... и ѡпстоупише ѿвьсоудоу словоущи бельградь ї иннїе ѡкрьсниѥ гради. и лѣтехоу ꙗкоже змиѥ крилате села и градове палеще... и вь тои земли гл҃ю срѣме дивна места и села запоустеше а црькви и градове разорише. а словоущи Бѣльградь и неволѥю оугринь прѣдасть измальтеном... А госпожда Ѥлена бывьша деспотица и неволею ѡстави славни градь коупїнникь и дадѣ се бѣгьствоу прѣко рѣке доунава оу вьноутрьноу оугрїю, а славноу и дивноу землю деспѡтовоу тоурци попленише, а лепи градь коупїнникь разорише м҃сца Сек .ѳ҃. дьнь.

— In the year 7029 (AD 1521): This year Sultan Suleiman fell upon the Sava River with a multitude of Ishmaelites (Turks), and they crossed the Sava as if on dry land... They besieged the famous city of Belgrade and neighbouring towns from all sides. They flew like winged serpents, burning down villages and towns... In that land called Syrmia, they devastated magnificent villages, and they razed churches and towns. The Hungarians were forced to surrender the famous Belgrade to the Ishmaelites... And lady Jelena, the former despotess (the widow of Serbian Despot Jovan Branković), was forced to leave the famous city of Kupinik, and she fled across the Danube to the interior of Hungary, while the Turks looted the famous and magnificent Despot's Land (Syrmia), and they razed the beautiful city of Kupinik on 9 September.

The print of the Goražde Psalter is clean, clear, and easy to read. The text in red was printed first, followed by the text in black. The faces of the cast metal types used for its printing were designed in the manner of uncial Cyrillic of medieval Serbian manuscripts, with certain elements of cursive. Ordinary text is printed in black letters with the corpus size of 2.7 millimetres. Their strokes have moderately varying widths; their ascenders and descenders are also of moderate sizes. In the first 136 leaves, a block of ten lines of text written in these letters is 74 millimetres high, and there are usually 18 to 20, though occasionally 21, lines per page. In the other leaves, the ten-line block is 70 millimetres high, with mostly 22 lines per page, and word spacing is tighter than in the first part of the book. Somewhat larger letters, 5 to 6 millimetres high, appear at the beginning of some sentences; they can be black or red. Headings and lines at the beginning of textual units are printed in red. Among the punctuation marks used in the book are the indexes and symbols in the form of a fish, horn, and quadruple dot.

The Goražde Psalter is decorated with headpieces, ornamental headings, and initials; they are printed from woodcuts. The level of decoration in the psalter is lower than that in the books of the printing houses of Đurađ Crnojević in Cetinje and Božidar Vuković in Venice; the latter began printing in 1519, contemporaneously with the Ljubavić brothers. There are four headpieces in the psalter, placed at the beginning of the Psalms, Canticles, Horologion, and Menologion. They are composed of intertwined vines, printed in black. The first headpiece is largest, measuring 108 by 93 millimetres. It is based on a headpiece in the hieratikon printed in 1508 in Târgoviște, Wallachia, by hieromonk Makarije. A Wallachian heraldic design in its centre is replaced with a cross-like ornament, beside other modifications. The second headpiece, measuring 94 by 51 millimetres, is a near copy of a headpiece in the Cetinje Octoechos. It is a Renaissance ornament of a distinctly Western provenance. The third headpiece, 110 by 70 millimetres, is copied from the 1508 Wallachian hieratikon. The fourth headpiece, 105 by 68 millimetres, is printed from a woodcut used in the first book of the Goražde printing house, the 1519 hieratikon. Unlike the other three headpieces, it has a figural representation in its centre. It depicts Mary Theotokos sitting on a throne with the Christ Child on her lap. Her feet rest on a suppedaneum, while Christ holds a cross in his hand.

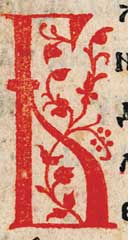
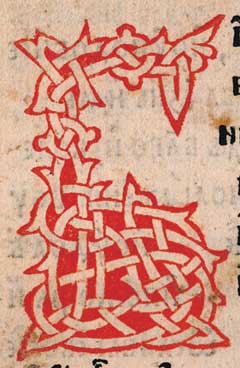
Letter Б, as represented in the two types of initials used in the psalter

The ornamental headings are printed in red in calligraphic ligatured script with interlaced letters. Especially elaborate are two headings, introducing the Canticles and the Psalms, respectively; they have floral additions in the form of little leaves. The initials used in the psalter can be divided into two groups. The more numerous group comprises 110 initials with slender strokes adorned with graceful foliate tendrils. Their design is based on the decorative tradition of Cyrillic manuscripts, as well as on Renaissance floral motifs. A majority of them are printed from woodcuts created for the 1519 hieratikon. The second group are 39 initials composed of densely intertwined vines. They are larger and look heavier, extending over six to seven lines of text. They are based on initials in the 1508 Wallachian hieratikon. The first part of the Goražde Psalter, comprising the Psalms, is more decorated than the rest of the book. In the first part, the two types of initials are used alternately, most of them printed in red. The rest of the book contains only the initials with slender strokes, and they are rarer, smaller, and simpler than in the Psalms; they are equally printed in black and red.

== Known copies ==
Božidar Petranović found a copy of the Goražde Psalter in the Krka Monastery in Dalmatia, and he described it in 1836 in the first volume of the journal Србско-далматински магазинъ (Serbo-Dalmatian Magazine), thus introducing the book to scholars. Pavel Jozef Šafárik mentioned the psalter for the first time in 1842 in an article, which was later translated from Czech into German and Russian. The psalter and the other books of the Goražde printing house were also discussed by Ilarion Ruvarac, Vatroslav Jagić, Ljubomir Stojanović, and, after World War II, by Đorđe Sp. Radojičić, Dejan Medaković, Vladimir Mošin, and Evgenij L. Nemirovskij, among others. Since 1836, seventeen copies of the psalter have been recorded, ten of which are known to have survived until today:

Copy no.	First described	Kept at	Preserved leaves
1	1836; Božidar Petranović	Krka Monastery	Lost copy
2	1847; Pavel Jozef Šafárik	Saint Petersburg, National Library of Russia, I.5.10	9–235, 237–303, 305–350
3	1862 (library catalogue)	Prague, National Museum, KNM 64 D 12	2–10, 12–19, 23, 25–50, 52–58, 60–135, 137–342, 346–347
4	1865; Pavel Jozef Šafárik	Unspecified monastery in Syrmia	Lost copy
5	1892 (library catalogue)	Kyiv, Vernadsky National Library of Ukraine, Кир.570	189–198, 201, 209–223, 225–248, 250–288, 290–304, 327–348
6	1901; Milenko M. Vukićević	Somewhere in Bosnia, possibly the Church of Saint George near Goražde	Lost copy
7	1901; Ljubomir Stojanović	Belgrade, Archive of the Serbian Academy of Sciences and Arts, Old Collection no. 161	2–9, 12–149, 151–186, 188, 194–267, 275–341, 346
8	1902; Ljubomir Stojanović	Belgrade, National Library of Serbia, no. 30	Lost copy
9	1902; Ljubomir Stojanović	Belgrade, National Library of Serbia, no. 150	Lost copy
10	c. 1905; Radoslav M. Grujić	Belgrade, Museum of the Serbian Orthodox Church, РГ 327	2–9, 11–12, 14, 24–296, 306–311, 313–349
11	1925; Ljubomir Stojanović	Church of Saint Mary in Velika Barna	Lost copy
12	1926; Ljubomir Stojanović	Lepavina Monastery	Lost copy
13	1952; Đorđe Sp. Radojičić	Novi Sad, Library of Matica Srpska, А Ср. II 2.1	3, 33–85, 87–311, 313–335, 348
14	1958; Vladimir Mošin	Krka Monastery, no. 70/III	305–351
15	1968; Evgenij L. Nemirovskij	Lvov, National Museum, Q 919, no. 4435/020409	150, 176, 201–214, 217–304
16	1971; Vladimir Mošin	Zagreb, Croatian History Museum, VSH-1606	2–7, 9–13, 16–136, 138–188, 190–349
17	2001; Evgenij L. Nemirovskij	Patriarchate of Peć	250–255, 257–287, 289–296, 298–303, 306–318, 321–343, 345–347

The copies contain inscriptions from various periods, and the oldest, dated 27 May 1617, is found in the seventh copy: "Let it be known when Josif lost his psalter." In 1870, historian and bibliophile Gavrilo Vitković sold this copy to the Serbian Learned Society. In the second half of the 18th century, the second copy belonged to the priest Stefan Kostić from Krtole in the Bay of Kotor. It came to Russia in 1847, when Vuk Karadžić sent it to Mikhail Pogodin in Moscow. The third copy was part of Šafárik's large library of manuscripts and old printed books. The fifth copy belonged to Vuk Karadžić, and later to Mikhail F. Rayevsky, who gave it to the Kiev Theological Academy in 1881. The eighth and the ninth copies were destroyed along with the National Library of Serbia by the German bombing of Belgrade in April 1941. The tenth copy belonged to the Serbian Orthodox Monastery of Marča in Croatia in the 18th century. At the beginning of the 20th century, Radoslav M. Grujić found it in a parish home in the village of Veliki Pašijan. The thirteenth copy was part of the collection of bibliophile Georgije Mihajlović from the town of Inđija, who gave it to the Library of Matica Srpska in 1962. The sixteenth copy once belonged to a Serbian Orthodox monastery in the village of Gaćište, Croatia.
