= Stefan Marinović =

Stefan Marinović may refer to:

- Stefan Marinović (printer), 16th century Serb printer
- Stefan Marinović (footballer), New Zealand football goalkeeper
