= Stefan Paštrović =

Serbian hieromonk (16th century)

- Born: 16th century
- Occupation: Orthodox priest
- Known for: author of the earliest Serbian primer

Stefan Paštrović (Serbian: Стефан Паштровић, fl. 1597) was a Serbian Orthodox hieromonk of Monastery of Gradište in Buljarica. He descended from the Paštrovići coastal tribe in modern-day Montenegro. According to some sources his position was hegumen.

Paštrović co-authored two manuscripts and engaged hieromonk Sava from Visoki Dečani to print them in Venice. Sava printed Proceedings for travelers or Prayer Book of Stefan Paštrović (Serbian: Зборник за путнике; Молитвеник Стефана Паштровића) and First Serbian Primer (Serbian: Први Српски Буквар) in the printing house Rampazetto and Heirs in Venice. "Prayer Book was published" on 19 May 1597 and "Serbian Primer" was printed a day later.

== See also ==
- Božidar Vuković
- Božidar Goraždanin
- Đurađ Crnojević
- Stefan Marinović
- Hieromonk Makarije
- Hieromonk Mardarije
- Hegumen Mardarije
- Vićenco Vuković
- Hieromonk Pahomije
- Trojan Gundulić
- Andrija Paltašić
- Jakov of Kamena Reka
- Bartolomeo Ginammi who followed Zagurović's footsteps reprinting Serbian books.
- Dimitrije Ljubavić
- Inok Sava

== Sources ==
- Ćirković, Sima (2004). The Serbs. Malden: Blackwell Publishing. ISBN 9781405142915.
