= Inok Sava =

Serbian author of literacy books (born c. 1530)

Инок Сава Inok Sava
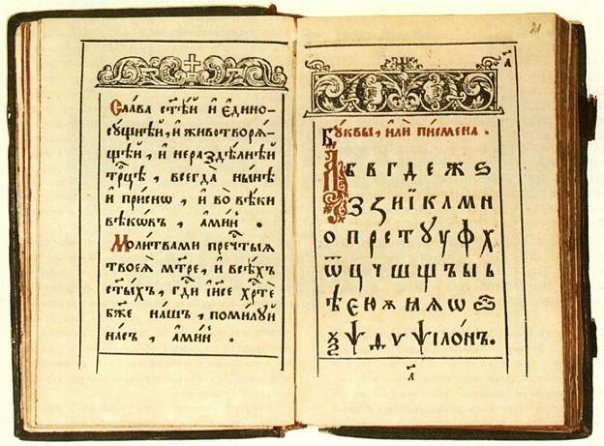
- A page of Serbian Cyrillic abecedary
- Language: Church Slavonic of the Serbian recension
- Published: 1597

Inok Sava (Serbian: Инок Сава, romanized: Inok Sava - c. 1530 – after 1597), was a Serbian monk, scribe and traveller who published a Serbian Primer (syllabary) in 1597. Of rare books designated by the National Library of Serbia, Inok Sava's Prvi srpski bukvar (First Serbian Spelling Book by Inok Sava) is considered among the rarest.

The first Serbian book to be published in Serbian Cyrillic to teach children the ABC was a primer called Bukvar. The Alphabet (Bukvar), printed at the Giovanni Antonio Rampazzetto Press in Venice in two editions in 1597, was composed by Inok Sava under the patronage of Stefan Paštrović. There was an earlier Азбука or Читанка (ABC (Reader)), the first Ruthenian language textbook, printed by Ivan Fyodorov in 1574. The primer featured the Old Church Slavonic or so-called Cyrillic alphabet as well.

== Biography ==
Inok Sava was a contemporary of printer Ivan Fyodorov, who published the Russian Primer in Lviv, Imperial Russia, in 1574 and another Primer four years later (1578) in Ostrog, Crown of the Kingdom of Poland.

Printing came late to Zeta (Montenegro), the first Montenegrin printed books – Cetinje Octoechos—appearing in 1494 some 55 years after Johannes Gutenberg printed the Bible on his newly-invented, mechanical movable type in 1439. Following the invasions of Serbian lands, leaders began to think of the needs of the people living in the conquered territories, and ordered churches and monasteries of worship and learning to be built and books to be provided for them. Most of the available manuscript copies of books were riddled with copyists' errors. Hieromonk Stefan Paštrović came to the idea to have the manuscripts corrected and printed into books like those which exist in northern Venice. He set out to find his relative Inok Sava, a monk at Visoki Dečani, and to send him on that mission.

We know little about Inok Sava except that he was born in Paštrovići and was associated with Visoki Dečani as a travelling monk, a gatherer of alms, milostinja in Serbian. Such a monk was usually referred to as putnik, meaning traveller. Inok Sava was well educated and familiar with Ivan Fyodorov's work. He also had the good fortune to improve on Fyodorov's primer.

The first page of the syllabary has the Serbian alphabet, followed by vowels, then the syllables, the names of all the letters, etc. The syllabary of Inok Sava originates from the time when very few European countries and cultures possessed their own teaching aids for school children. The syllabary fascinates the most with its teaching methods because it was the first in Europe to have applied the principle of phonetic reading. However, this syllabary remained neglected and somewhat forgotten. Meanwhile, the Serbs learned literacy from imported books, either published in Imperial Russia or the territories belonging to the Holy Roman Empire, as the Austrian Empire was once called. These Serbian primers were based on Old Church Slavonic and Slavonic-Serbian, a common language of all the South Slavic people of the Balkans.

By the 19th century, the Inok Sava Bukvar was known to only a few academics at the time. It's not surprising because the Age of Enlightenment had initiated new primers such as the Bukvar by Gavrilo Stefanović Venclović, 1717; Pervoe učenie (First Beginners) by Zaharije Orfelin, 1767; Pervoe učenie by Theophan Prokopovich was brought from Russia to Serbia in 1724 through the auspices of Mojsije Petrović of the Metropolitanate of Karlovci; Bukvar by Joseph Kurzböck, printed in Vienna in 1770; Bukvar by Teodor Janković Mirijevski, 1776) and newer methods of learning.

In 1893 the Russian consul in Shkoder, Krilov, gave the first edition, printed in Venice on 20 May 1597, as a gift to Serbian journalist Okica Gluščević, who was translating Leo Tolstoy's "War and Peace" at the time. Later, in 1921, Milorad Dimitrijević, a Belgrade engineer, bought the second edition, published on 25 May 1597, in Dubrovnik, where he was on a trip. Both editions, the first and the second, were presented to the National Library of Serbia. The first edition consisting of only two sheets of paper, of which we only have a copy today, was burned in the German bombing of Belgrade and the National Library on April 6, 1941, and second edition, on four sheets, is fortunately preserved.

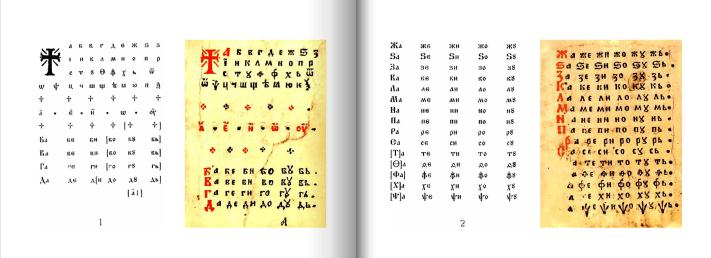

Pages from Азбука or Читанка (Azbuka or Čitanka), the first Serbian language textbook primer, published by Inok Sava in 1597.

== See also ==
- Cyrillic script
- Andrija Paltašić
- Božidar Vuković
- Dimitrije Ljubavić, Božidar Goraždanin's grandson
- Hegumen Mardarije
- Hieromonk Makarije
- Hieromonk Mardarije
- Hieromonk Pahomije
- Jakov of Kamena Reka
- Mojsije Dečanac
- Stefan Marinović
- Stefan Paštrović
- Trojan Gundulić
- Vićenco Vuković
- Đurađ Crnojević
- Teodor Račanin
- Jerolim Zagurović
