= Hieromonk Pahomije =

Serbian Orthodox hieromonk and book printer

- Born: 15th century
- Died: after 1544
- Occupation: hieromonk

Hieromonk Pahomije (Serbian Cyrillic: Пахомије; fl. 1496–1544) was a Serbian Orthodox hieromonk and one of the first printers of books in the Serbian language. He learned his printing skills from Hieromonk Makarije at the Crnojević printing house in the period of 1494–96. In 1518 he accepted the invitation of Božidar Vuković and went to Venice where he organized printing at the Vuković printing house in the period of 1519/1520–21.

== Zeta ==
The first printing house Pahomije worked at was the Crnojević printing house in Obod, Rijeka Crnojevića, in the period of 1494–96. There he learned printing skills from hieromonk Makarije and practicised it until Đurađ Crnojević fled Zeta and went to Venice in 1496. Pahomije was one of eight printers who worked at the Crnojević printing house.

== Venice ==
In 1518 Božidar Vuković invited Pahomije to come to Venice and organize the printing at the printing press of Vuković. Pahomije accepted this invitation and went to Venice. Pahomije was head of the organization of work at the printing house, and also worked as an editor and corrector there. The printing house was operational in two periods, 1519/1520–21 and 1536–40. During the first period Pahomije printed three books, a book of hours (Časlovac, or Psaltir) in 1519, Liturgijar and Molitvenik.

In March 1520 he wrote on the cover of one of the books he printed that he was "from the islands of the Diocletian Lake" Serbian: от остров Диоклитијског језера. In a 1544 document he wrote reka instead of rijeka (Rijeka Crnojevića), concluding that he hailed from an Ekavian accent region (somewhere in modern Serbia), however, in some later works this assumption was rejected.

== See also ==
- Božidar Vuković
- Božidar Goraždanin
- Đurađ Crnojević
- Stefan Marinović
- Hieromonk Mardarije
- Hegumen Mardarije
- Vićenco Vuković
- Trojan Gundulić
- Andrija Paltašić
- Jakov of Kamena Reka
- Schweipolt Fiol
- Bartolomeo Ginammi who followed Zagurović's footsteps reprinting Serbian books.
- Dimitrije Ljubavić
- Stefan Paštrović
- Inok Sava
- Mojsije Dečanac

== Sources ==
- Sakcinski, Ivan Kukuljević (1858). Slaovnik umjetnikah jugoslavenskih. Tiskom narode tiskarne Ljudevita Gaja. p. 329.
- Petrović, Mihailo (1941). Đerdapski ribolovi u prošlosti i u sadašnjosti. Izd. Zadužbine Mikh. R. Radivojeviča.
- Radojičić, Đorđe Sp (1952). Rukopisna i štampana knjiga. Muzej primenjene umetnosti (Belgrade, Serbia). Stamparija "Jugoslavija".
- Prilozi (1955). Prilozi za književnost, jezik, istoriju i folklor. Државна штампарија Краљевине Срба, Хрвата и Словенаца.
- Bošnjak, Mladen (1968). A study of Slavic incunabula. Mladost.
- Марковић, Томаш (1969). Историја школства и просвјете у Црној Гори. Завод за издавање уџбеника Социјалистичке Републике Србије.
- Stanojević, Gligor; Vasić, Milan (1975). Istorija Crne Gore (3): od početka XVI do kraja XVIII vijeka. Titograd: Redakcija za istoriju Crne Gore. OCLC 799489791.
- Историски (1986). Историски записи. с.н.
- Aćimović, Dragoljub; Đorđević, Milivoje (1987). Štamparstvo u Užičkom kraju, 1537-1987: povodom 450 godina Rujanske štamparije. Dimitrije Tucović.
- Biblioteka, Matica Srpska (Novi Sad) (1995). Godǐsnjak Biblioteke Matice srpske za ... Biblioteka Matice srpske.
- Немировски, Евгениј Љвович (1996). Почеци штампарства у Црној Гори, 1492-1496. ЦНБ "Ђурђе Црнојевић".
- Ćirković, Sima (2004). The Serbs. Malden: Blackwell Publishing. ISBN 9781405142915.
