= Four Gospels of Târgoviște =

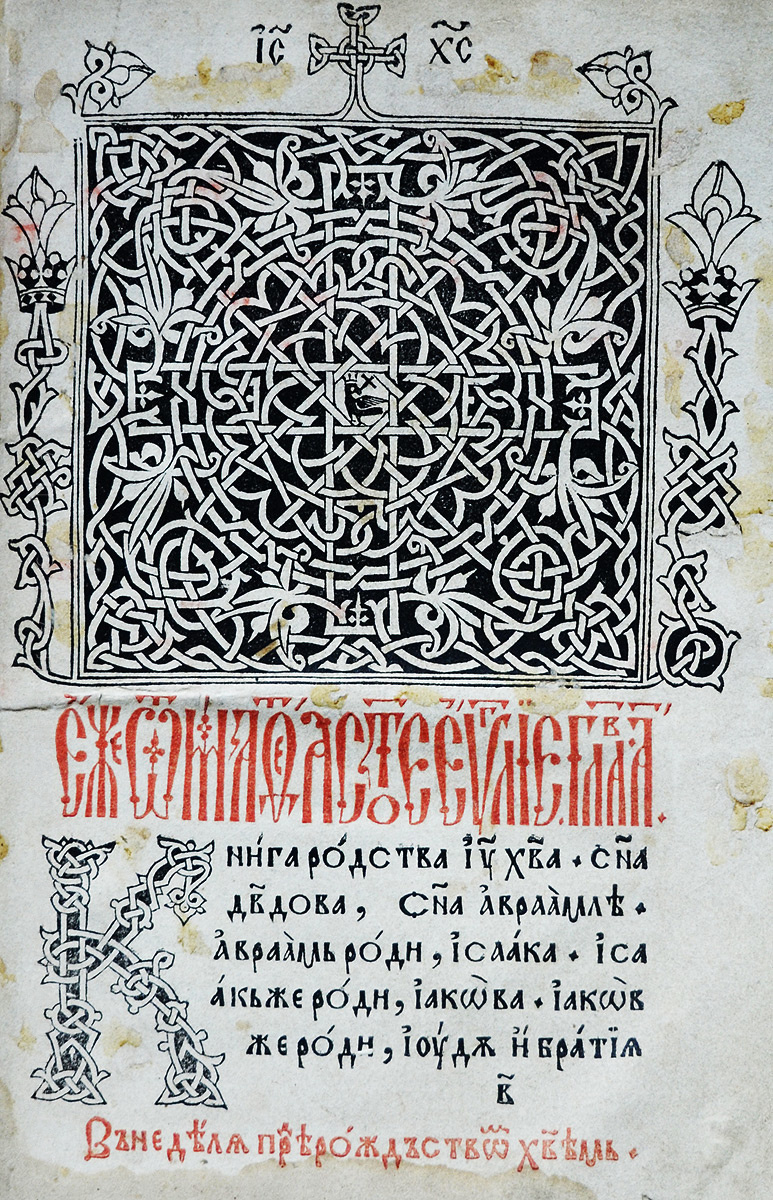
- Publisher: 25 June 1512

The Four Gospels of Târgoviște is a printed version of the four gospels, printed in 1512 in the Bulgarian redaction of Church Slavonic. The book contains 179 pages and uses the Tarnovo Literary School spelling rules. It was printed in Târgoviște, the capital of Wallachia at the time, at the behest of the Voivode Neagoe Basarab. The edition is ornately decorated by Serbian Hieromonk Makarije.
