= Vićenco Vuković =

Serbian-Venetian printer

Count palatine Vićenco Vuković
- Вићентије Вуковић
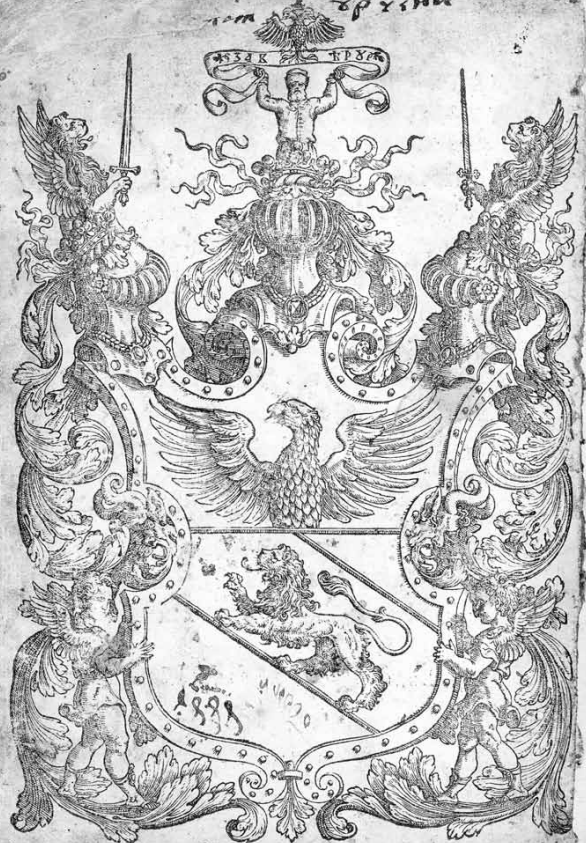
- Psalter with Services, Venice (1546)
- Died: Republic of Venice
- Citizenship: Republic of Venice
- Known for: Son of and successor to the founder of the Serbian Venetian Printing House, Božidar Vuković.
- Notable work: tajnopis (reprint); Triod postnyj (1560-1561, with Stefan Marinović)
- Children: Justina
- Parent(s): Božidar Vuković; Della Vechia

Vićentije "Vićenco" Vuković (Serbian Cyrillic: Вићентије Вуковић, Latin: Vincenzo della Vecchia; fl. 1560–1571) was a Venetian printer and editor of books in Serbian out the Republic of Venice. He was the son of one of the first publishers of printed books in Serbian, Božidar Vuković, and partner of Jerolim Zagurović, Jakov of Kamena Reka and Stefan Marinović.

Vuković succeeded the noble title conte palladin from his father, but was patriotically self-styled as Serbian Despot (Servie Despot), since the last official Serbian Despot, Pavle Bakić, had died in 1537.

Due to the popularity of his father's books, Vićenco initially made a living making reprints of his father's books and successfully selling them, such as Октоих петогласник, reprinted in 1560, based on the 1537 edition.

In 1561, Stefan Marinović printed his first book in the printing house of Vićenco Vuković. Vuković's printing press was used by Jakov of Kamena Reka in 1566 when he printed the Book of Hours. In 1571, Jakov again rented the printing press of Vićenco Vuković.

== Annotations ==
- Name: Vićenco, Vićenzo, Vićentije

== See also ==
- Božidar Vuković
- Božidar Goraždanin
- Đurađ Crnojević
- Stefan Marinović
- Hieromonk Makarije
- Hieromonk Mardarije
- Hegumen Mardarije
- Hieromonk Pahomije
- Trojan Gundulić
- Andrija Paltašić
- Jakov of Kamena Reka
- Schweipolt Fiol
- Bartolomeo Ginammi who followed Zagurović's footsteps reprinting Serbian books.
- Dimitrije Ljubavić
- Stefan Paštrović
- Inok Sava
- Jerolim Zagurović
- Jovan Maleševac
