= Božidar Vuković =

Serbian printer in Venice

Palladin Božidar Vuković
- Божидар Вуковић
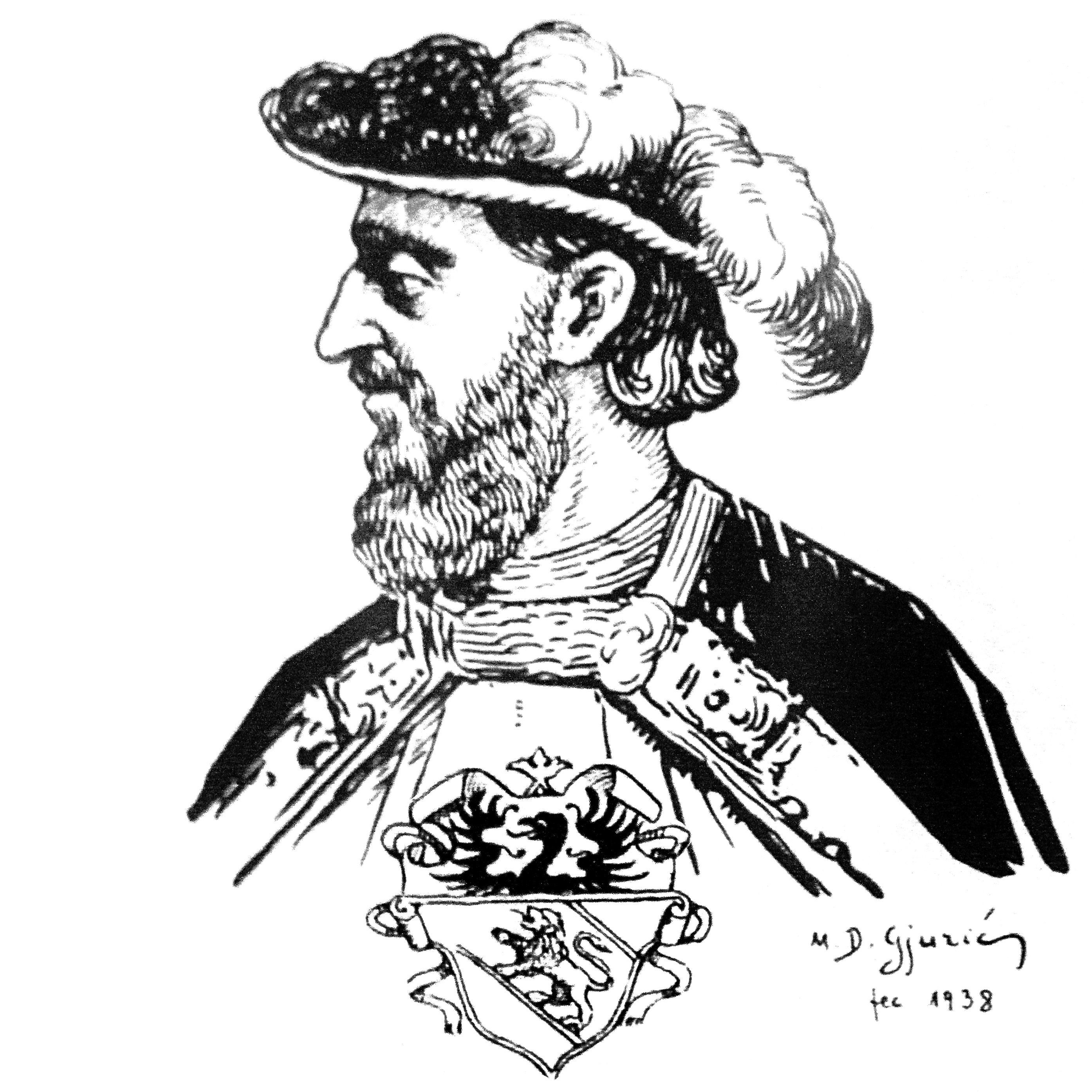
- Born: after 1460; Đurići, Podgorica, Crnojevići Zeta (now Montenegro)
- Died: c. 1539; Republic of Venice
- Resting place: Monastery of Starčeva Gorica, Lake Skadar
- Citizenship: Republic of Venice
- Occupation: printer
- Known for: Founder of the Serbian Venetian Printing House.
- Notable work: Služabnik (1517)
- Spouse: Della Vechia
- Children: Vićentije Vuković

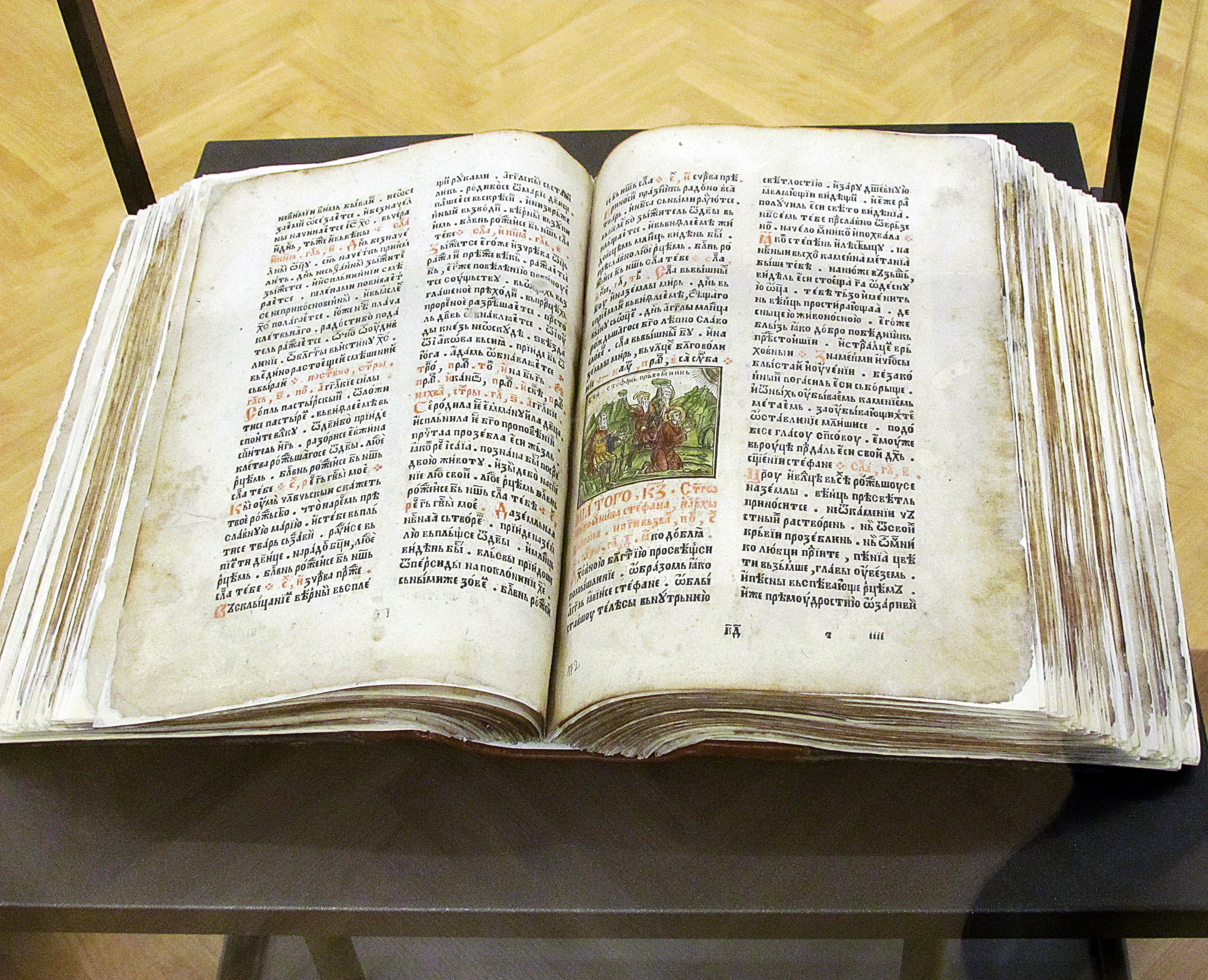
Božidar Vuković's Festal Menalon, 1538, Venice.

Božidar Vuković (Serbian Cyrillic: Божидар Вуковић, Italian: Dionisio della Vecchia, Latin: Dionisius a Vetula; c. 1460 — c. 1539/1540) was one of the first publishers and editors of Serbian printed books. Born in Podgorica, in medieval Zeta (in modern Montenegro), he migrated to Italy and founded the famous Vuković printing house in Venice. His printing house was operational over two periods. In the first period, 1519–21, three books were printed (Psalter, Liturgijar, and Molitvenik or Zbornik). In the second period, 1536–40, two books were printed (2nd edition of Molitvenik or Zbornik, and praznični Minej or Sabornik).

== Biography ==
=== Early life ===
According to his own books, Vuković was born after 1460. In his 1519/20 Psalter, Vuković had signed himself as "Božidar Vuković of the Đurići, of Podgorica" (Serbian: Божидар Вуковић од Ђурића, Подгоричанин). He was most likely born in the town of Podgorica, where he did own a house and several parcels of land in its vicinity, as recorded even after his emigration to Western Europe when he grew up - the lands he owned were probably family heritage. This seems to be confirmed by the fact that his sister remained behind in Podgorica, probably in their family property. The origin of the Đurić family he belonged to is a bit more blurry, but it is possible that they hailed from the east, the Shkodër region, where it is known that Vuković also possessed some property, as well where he had very close living cousins.

Upon migrating to Italy, Vuković and his family became subjects of the Republic of Venice, which had established a corpus of off-shore possessions along the Adriatic coastline – along its eastern reaches, the Venetian possessions cut deeper into the territory of the Balkan Peninsula, engulfing eastern portions of Montenegro and northern parts of Albania. The Serbian Despotate had lost its last possession in the region with the fall of Medun to the Ottomans; the regional cities had found salvation in the patronage of the Venetian Republic, an important Mediterranean naval factor. The expansionism of the Ottoman Empire might have been the cause of Vuković's family's decision to seek shelter in the more safe and fortified home that Podgorica offered - or the reason might have been more practical; namely the expansion of trading services - his family was later frequently practicing trade in Venice.

As the Ottomans were pushing through even the last remains of the independent Christian feudal states in the Balkans, Božidar Vuković had migrated to Venice during the late 15th or early 16th century, along with his brother Nikola. Podgorica fell into Ottoman hands in 1474, during the Ottoman-Venetian War; there are indications that Vuković might have fled the Balkans in the refugee waves fleeing from the Ottomans, in particular after the fall of Cetinje, the seat of Zeta, in 1496 and the subsequent flight of its last ruler Đurađ Crnojević to Venice across Budva.

=== Venice ===
When medieval Zeta (in modern Montenegro) fell to Ottoman occupation in 1496, Vuković fled with Crnojević to Venice, where he earned his living as a merchant. He joined the Eastern Orthodox Christian community and became a member of the Scuola dei Greci, enlisting as "Bozhidar of Veche, a Serb" after paying his fee, signing himself as such on every occasion. He later also became the chairman of the Brotherhood in 1536.

At the time, Venice was one of the centers of European printing, and there was a lack of Serbian liturgical books in the lands conquered by the Ottomans. Therefore, Vuković decided to use his personal earnings and open a printing press with Serbian letters in 1519 or 1520.

Vuković married a noblewoman of the Della Vecchia family, whose surname he added to his; he was known by this name in Italy. On some occasions, he used the title vojvoda ("duke", or "palladin"), given to him by Emperor Charles V in 1533. In accordance with his last wish, his body was carried back to his homeland and buried in the monastery of Starčeva Gorica in Lake Skadar. His son Vićentije Vuković inherited the press and continued doing the work that his father started. In 1597 the Serbian Venetian Printing Press passed into the hands of an Italian named Giorgio Rampazetto, who printed two important books of Stefan Paštrović – the Collection of Travelers and the earliest Serbian primer. In the 1570s Jerolim Zagurović, a native of Kotor, was active in Venice as a printer. The Vuković printing house would continue working for another century.

== Work ==
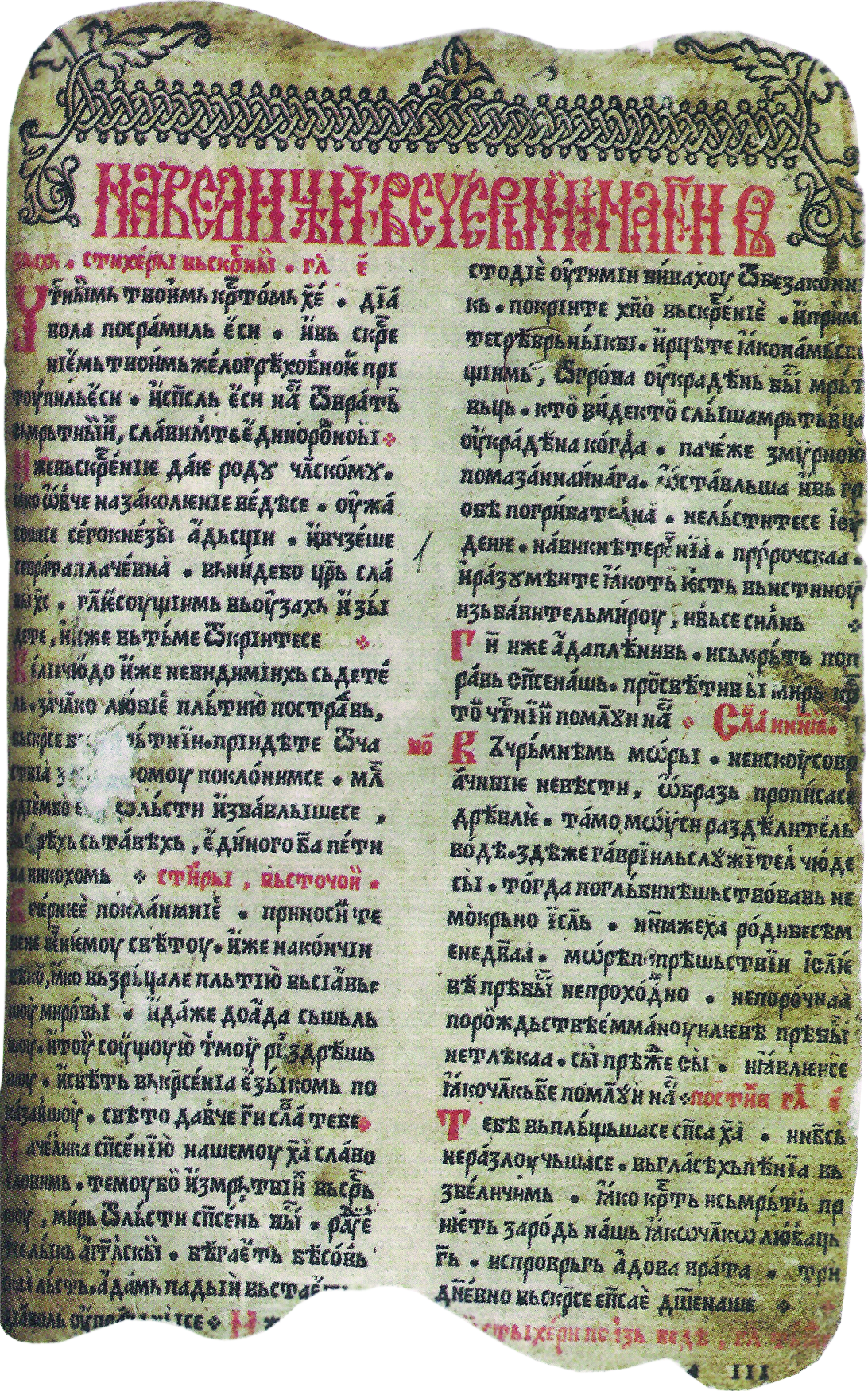
Oktoih (1537, in serb-slavonic) from the Venetian printing house of Božidar Vuković

The oldest printed book in Serbian-Slavonic was first issued in 1483, from the printing-press of Andreas Torresanus, de Asula (1451–1529) in Venice. A few years later the Serbian nobleman Božidar Vuković bought a printing-press in Venice and established it at Obod in Montenegro, from which he issued in 1493 the first church book—the Oktoih—printed on Serb territory. There is a copy of this book in the British Museum. Vuković's printing press operated in two phases. In the first one (1519–20), he printed Služabnik (1517) and Psaltir sa posledovanjem i časlovcem (Psalter, 1520). In the second phase (1536–40), which came after a long break, he published five more books in Serbian Cyrillic: Zbornik (1536), Molitvenik (Prayer book, 1536), Oktoih petoglasnik (1537), Minej (The Book of Months, 1538), Molitvenik trebnik (1539 or 1540). All of his editions are printed versions of liturgical works in Serbian redaction of Church Slavonic that have long been in use in the Serbian Orthodox Church. In addition to remedying the dearth of Serbian books, he also wanted to produce books which were printed in smaller letters, making them more compact and easier to carry. His editions were intricately prepared, with well-proportioned letters and fine miniatures. Vuković collaborated with other Serb refugees in Venice such as hieromonk Pahomije from Rijeka Crnojevića in Montenegro (ot Crne Gori or Reki), hierodeacon Mojsije of Budimlje (ot serbskije zemlji, otčstvom že ot mjesta naricamego Budimlja) and priests Teodosije and Genadije from the Mileševa monastery. Vuković also donated books and other gifts to the Mileševa monastery.

His venture is explained by reasons of sale, his care for his soul's sake, and of patriotism ("I saw the compiling of the printing presses of Godly scriptures in Greek, French, and other languages, and I wished eagerly to compile in printing press also our Serb and also Bulgarian ones").

He distributed his books to monks via Kotor and Dubrovnik. The books influenced not only Serbian printing, but also Bulgarian, Romanian and Russian printing. In his first testament, Vuković left his printing press to the monasteries in Lake Skadar, his homeland. He later revised it and left it to his son Vićentije Vuković, who carried on the enterprise of his father, and their printing-press continued to work up to 1597, issuing several church books in the Serbian-Slavonic language. During the first half of the 16th century the Serbs had printing-presses in Belgrade, Shkodër, Bojana river, Goražde, Mileševa and elsewhere. However, printing ceased in the Serb lands under the Ottoman rule and was only resumed in the mid-18th century. Most of the printing during the Ottoman period, however, was produced in Russia, and Serb-inhabited lands of the Habsburg Monarchy, but only under special license. Books for ecclesiastical and educational use had to be imported from St. Petersburg, Moscow, Venice, Trieste, or Vienna, depending on the political circumstances of the day.

== Legacy ==
He later revised his will and left the printing house to his son Vićentije Vuković, who carried on the work. After a Kotoran nobleman by the name of Jerolim Zagurović, the printing house slowly declined, subsequently being taken over by the Venetians.

In 2012, Serbian writer Katarina Brajović published a novel about Božidar Vuković titled 'A Printer and Veronika' (Serbian: Штампар и Вероника, чудесна повест Божидара Вуковића Подгоричанина).

Inventor Nikola Tesla's most prized book was the 236-page Služabnik, printed in Venice in 1517, by Božidar Vuković. This rare book is now on display in the Harry S. Truman Presidential Library and Museum in Independence, Missouri.

== See also ==
- Đurađ Crnojević
- Stefan Marinović
- Hieromonk Makarije
- Hieromonk Mardarije
- Hegumen Mardarije
- Vićenco Vuković
- Hieromonk Pahomije
- Trojan Gundulić
- Andrija Paltašić
- Jakov of Kamena Reka
- Schweipolt Fiol
- Coresi
- Francysk Skaryna
- Bartolomeo Ginammi
- Dimitrije Ljubavić
- Inok Sava
- Stefan Paštrović
- Jovan Maleševac
- Ivan Fyodorov (printer)

== Sources ==
- Andolfo, Alessandra (2019). "Words and Swords: The Liturgical Printed Books for the Serbs through the 15th and 16th Centuries". Słowiańszczyzna wielowyznaniowa w dawnych wiekach. Kraków: Księgarnia Akademicka. pp. 55–72. Archived from the original on 2024-08-15.
- Brajović, Katarina (2012). Штампар и Вероника, чудесна повест Божидара Вуковића Подгоричанина [A Printer and Veronika] (in Serbian). Štampar Makarije Oktoih.
- Ćirković, Sima (2004). The Serbs. Malden: Blackwell Publishing.
- Fin, Monica (2018). "Libri serbi a Venezia fra XVI e XVIII secolo". Кирило-методиевски студии. 26: 132–158.
- Ivić, Pavle; Pešikan, Mitar (1995). "Serbian printing". The History of Serbian Culture. Edgware: Porthill Publishers. pp. 137–145.
- Lazić, Miroslav A. (2016). "Serbian Printed Book Decoration in the 15th and 16th Centuries: Centres and Creative Production". Sacral art of the Serbian lands in the Middle Ages. Belgrade: Serbian National Committee of Byzantine Studies. pp. 485–493.
- Lazić, Miroslav A. (2018). "Venice and Editions of Early Serbian Printed Books". Thesaurismata. 48: 161–192.
- Lazić, Miroslav A. (2020). "Between an Imaginary and a Historical Figure: Božidar Vuković's Professional Identity". Ricerche slavistiche. Nuova serie. 3 (63): 141–156. Archived from the original on 2022-01-26.
- Marciani, Corrado (1972). "I Vukovic tipografi-librai Slavi a Venezia nel XVI secolo". Economia e Storia. 19 (3): 342–362.
- Mavroidi, Fani (1983). "I Serbi e la confraternita Greca di Venezia". Balkan Studies. 24 (2): 511–529. Archived from the original on 2020-03-19.
- Medaković, Dejan (1958). Grafika srpskih štampanih knjiga XV-XVII veka (in Serbian). Naučno delo.
- Pantić, Miroslav (1992). "I libri serbi e croati e attività tipografica a Venezia". Il libro nel bacino adriatico (secc. XV-XVIII). Firenze: Olschki. pp. 51–64.
- Pelusi, Simonetta (2000). "Il libro liturgico veneziano per serbi e croati fra Quattro e Cinquecento". Le civiltà del libro e la stampa a Venezia: Testi sacri ebraici, cristiani, islamici dal Quattrocento al Settecento. Padova: Il Poligrafo. pp. 43–52.
- Polomac, Vladimir R. (2022). "Serbian Early Printed Books from Venice: Creating Models for Automatic Text Recognition using Transkribus". Scripta & e-Script. 22: 11–29.
- Polomac, Vladimir R.; Rabus, Achim (2024). "Serbian Early Printed Books from Venice: Quantitative Approach to Orthographic Variations". Studi Slavistici. 21 (2): 37–60. Archived from the original on 2025-05-24.
- Skovran, Anika (1980). "Printer Božidar Vuković". Review: Yugoslav monthly magazine. 20: 30–32.
