= Hieromonk Makarije =

16th-century Serbian monk and printer

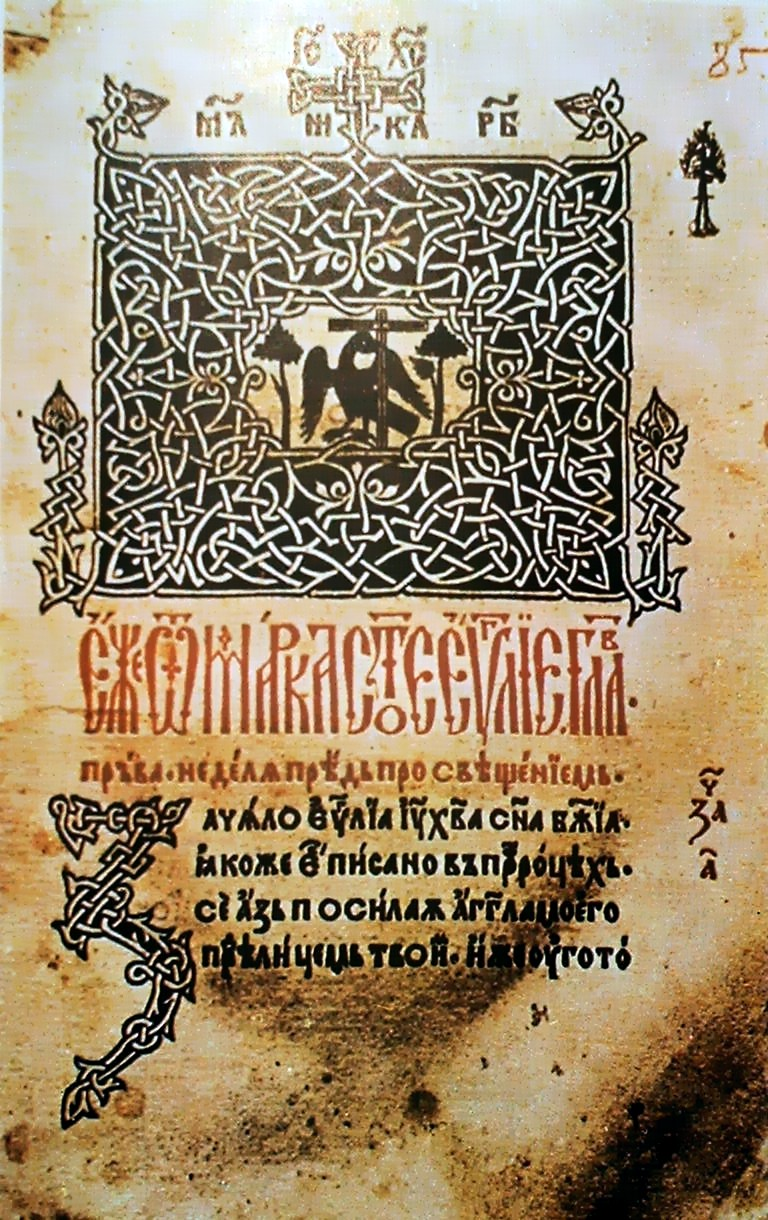
- Makarije's missal (1508)
- Born: Макарије; 15th century
- Died: after 1528; Hilandar monastery
- Other names: Јеромонах Макарије, Макариjе от Чрниjе Гори
- Occupation: Hieromonk
- Known for: founder of Serbian and Romanian printing

Hieromonk Makarije (Serbian: Јеромонах Макарије; fl. 1494 – died after 1528) was a Serbian monk who is considered the founder of Serbian and Romanian printing, having printed the first book in the Serbian language and the first book in the territory of Walachia (part of modern-day Romania).

== Biography ==
The origins of printing in Montenegro are linked to the press established in Obod, near Cetinje, in 1493 by Đurađ Crnojević, the eldest son of Ivan Crnojević, the ruler of Zeta (an earlier designation of the land of Crna Gora, also known as Montenegro). At the time, Zeta was the last free territory of the former powerful Serbian state that began to collapse after the Battle of Kosovo in 1389. In an attempt to defend Zeta from Turkish aspirations to the land, Đurađ Crnojević sought an ally in Venice. He dispatched a monk, Makarije, to Venice to purchase a printing press and learn the trade of printing, probably in the printing works of Aldus Manutius or from Andrija Paltašić.

After returning to Cetinje, he founded a printing works in Obod, then the capital, and later, with the shifting of the capital, moved back to Cetinje, where in 1494 he printed the first book in Serbian, an Oktoih (it is probable that the first two or four parts were printed in Venice, but the last four were printed in Cetinje). Serbia, although in straitened circumstances, acquired a press some three decades after the invention of movable type.

After the fall of Zeta to the Turks in 1496, Makarije fled to Walachia. It was owing to these circumstances that the second and third Serbian printing presses were established outside Serb lands. In 1508, Makarije started a printing works in Târgoviște, where he printed the first books in this principality; and his compatriot Božidar Vuković of Podgorica also started printing in Venice in 1519.

After Vuković came Jerolim Zagurović, formerly a Kotor native, who also printed in Venice in the 16th century. Contemporaneously with Vuković, Božidar Ljubavić – better-known as Božidar Goraždanin – and his sons Đurađ and Teodor Ljubavić started the Goražde printing house, which worked between 1519 and 1523, at first in Venice and then near Goražde in present-day Bosnia and Herzegovina. In 1544, Božidar's grandson Dimitrije Ljubavić (Đurađ Ljubavić's son) transferred the printing press from Goražde to Târgoviște, where he printed two books, in 1545 and 1547.

Makarije, a few years later, moved to the Hilandar monastery, where he became the abbot. There he helped found the fourth printing press, the well-known Hilandar printing works at Mount Athos, Greece. Makarije also wrote the treatise "On the Borders of Dacia" (O međah Dacije) which is preserved in Hilandar library.

The British Library has what appears to be one of the few complete copies of Makarije's 1495 Psalter with liturgical appendices in existence, and the Chester Beatty Library has a magnificent copy, printed on vellum, of Serb Božidar Vuković's 1538 Menaion. Works by Francysk Skaryna, Ivan Fyodorov, and Petr Mstislavich are also well represented. England's early contacts with Serbian and Muscovy merchants meant that books were acquired by English traders and brought home as curiosities. Their trophies survived undisturbed in libraries, rather than suffering the fate of being handled to destruction by invaders in their native lands.

Serbian-American scientist and inventor Nikola Tesla's most prized possession was Božidar Vuković's 1517 Sluzbenik, an inheritance from his father, a Serbian Orthodox priest. This rare book is now on display in the Harry S. Truman Presidential Library and Museum in Independence, Missouri.

== Works ==
- Psalter with liturgical appendices (Cetinje, 1495)
- Gospels (Târgoviște, 1512)

== See also ==
- Božidar Vuković
- Božidar Goraždanin
- Đurađ Crnojević
- Stefan Marinović
- Hieromonk Mardarije
- Hegumen Mardarije
- Vićenco Vuković
- Hieromonk Pahomije
- Trojan Gundulić
- Andrija Paltašić
- Jakov of Kamena Reka
- Dimitrije Ljubavić
- Schweipolt Fiol
- Stefan Paštrović
- Inok Sava

== Sources ==
- Ćirković, Sima (2004). The Serbs. Malden: Blackwell Publishing. ISBN 978-1-4051-4291-5.
