= Trojan Gundulić =

Merchant and printer from the Republic of Ragusa

- The Gospel printed at the printing house of Trojan Gundulić in Belgrade, 1552
- Born: c. 1500; Dubrovnik, Republic of Ragusa (modern-day Croatia)
- Died: c. 1555 (aged 54–55); Belgrade, Ottoman Empire (modern-day Serbia)
- Other name: Troiano Gondola
- Occupations: barber, trader
- Known for: financing publishing some of the earliest printed srbulje

Trojan Gundulić (Serbian Cyrillic: Тројан Гундулић, Italian: Troiano Gondola; c. 1500 - c. 1555) was a merchant and printer from the Republic of Ragusa who is remembered for his participation in the Belgrade printing house, The Four Gospels ("Četverojevanđelje").

== Life ==
Trojan was born in the town of Dubrovnik in the Republic of Ragusa (modern-day Croatia) into the Gondola family (Gundulić), which was a Ragusan noble family of Italian origins. Gundulić started as a barber in his hometown and remained in this trade after his arrival to Ottoman-held Belgrade (modern-day Serbia). He later went into the trade business, which enabled him to finance the printing of books. A large printing shop was established in Gundulić's house after he learned the printing trade from his mentor Radiša Dmitrović. Gundulić continued the work on Četverojevanđelje started by Radiša Dmitrović, who died early. In his turn, Gundulić passed the work to Hieromonk Mardarije of Mrkšina Crkva Monastery, an experienced printer. According to some sources, it was Hieromonk Mardarije who inspired first Dmitrović and then Gundulić to invest in printing business and organized all activities during set up of the printing house in Belgrade.

An inventory of the goods found in Gundulić's house and shop in Belgrade, drawn up on 21 January (probably 1563) and copied into the Dubrovnik chancery records that December, listed 121 books. These were 59 Serbian Gospels printed in Cyrillic (probably copies of the 1552 Four Gospels), 39 further gospel books, 10 Octoechoi, 6 festal Menaia, 4 prayer books and 3 small office books.

== See also ==
- List of notable Ragusans
- Andrija Paltašić (c. 1450–c. 1500), a Venetian printer from Kotor
- Božidar Vuković
- Božidar Goraždanin
- Đurađ Crnojević
- Stefan Marinović
- Stefan Paštrović
- Hieromonk Makarije
- Hieromonk Mardarije
- Hegumen Mardarije
- Vićenco Vuković
- Hieromonk Pahomije
- Andrija Paltašić
- Jakov of Kamena Reka
- Bartolomeo Ginammi who followed Zagurović's footsteps reprinting Serbian books.
- Dimitrije Ljubavić
- Inok Sava
