= Andrija Paltašić =

- Born: c. 1440; Cattaro, Albania Veneta, Venetian Republic
- Died: c. 1500; Venice, Venetian Republic
- Occupation: printer
- Known for: being first South Slavic printer

Andrija Paltašić also known as Andrija Paltašić-Kotoranin (Italian: Andrea Paltasichi Latin Andreas de Paltasichis; 1440–1500) was a Venetian printer and publisher who was active from 1476 to 1492. He was born in Kotor and was part of the Paltašić noble family. He moved to Venice in the 1470s where he became one of the first printers. He died in Venice in ca. 1500. Paltašić is the first known South Slavic printer.

== Family ==
He was born in Kotor, in the Albania Veneta (today's Montenegro) of the Republic of Venice, into an old Kotoran noble family, as son of Jakov Paltašić, and grandson of Radelja Paltašić. In 1470 another member of his family, Miloje Paltašić, also moved to Venice.

== Work ==
He printed books at Venice between 1476 and 1492. Along with him, Dobrić Dobričević from Lastovo also began working; the two published the works of Lactantius in 1479. Hieromonk Makarije learned printing skills from Paltašić. Paltašić died in Venice.

Paltašić is known to have printed the famous Greek and Roman works (by Cicero, Diodorus Siculus, Virgil, Terence, Ovid, Sextus Propertius, Juvenal, Tibullus, Catullus and others) as well as the works of humanist writers, historiographers and lexicographers. On top of this he also printed books concerning religion, such as the Bible in Italian.

Paltašić's works currently remain all over Europe. In Southeastern Europe, there remain 41 of his works, out of which 38 are kept in Croatia, with three in Montenegro.

== See also ==
- Paltašić family
- Božidar Vuković
- Božidar Goraždanin
- Đurađ Crnojević
- Stefan Marinović
- Stefan Paštrović
- Hieromonk Makarije
- Hieromonk Mardarije
- Hegumen Mardarije
- Vićenco Vuković
- Hieromonk Pahomije
- Trojan Gundulić
- Jakov of Kamena Reka
- Bartolomeo Ginammi who followed Zagurović's footsteps reprinting Serbian books.
- Dimitrije Ljubavić
- Mojsije Dečanac
- Inok Sava
