= Dimitrije Ljubavić =

Serbian Orthodox deacon

Dimitrije Ljubavić (Serbian: Димитрије Љубавић, romanized: Dimitrije Ljubavić - Venice, January 1519 – Brașov, 1564) was a Serbian Orthodox deacon, humanist, writer and printer who together with German reformer Philip Melanchthon initiated the first formal contact between the Eastern Orthodox Church and the Lutherans in 1559 when Ljubavić took a copy of the Augsburg Confession to Patriarch Joasaph II of Constantinople. He is also referred to as Demetrios Mysos or Demetrius Mysos (also Demetrius of Thessalonica) in Lutheran and other Western books.

== Biography ==
He came from a distinguished family of early printers, scholars, diplomats, and humanists. He is best known as the founder of the second printing press in Târgoviște in Wallachia in 1545. He had many apprentices, among whom were Romanian deacon Coresi, the Serbian monks Mojsije Dečanac, Petar, and Opar (Oprea). The Lutheran leader Philip Melanchthon entrusted him with a letter addressed to the Ecumenical Patriarch of Constantinople to join forces against the Holy Roman Empire and the Ottomans, but all came to naught.

The House of Ljubavić is a great example of how printing became a family enterprise. Božidar Ljubavić (1460-1527) was the head of a printing dynasty from the city and municipality of Goražde in the Serbian land of Bosnia-Hercegovina just at the time when the Turkish invasions had taken place. He was best known for printing textbooks and biblical material in Church Slavonic, Greek, and Latin for the Serbian Orthodox Church and the Lutheran Church during the Reformation.

Dimitrije's grandfather was Serbian printer Božidar Ljubavić, who is better known as Božidar Goraždanin. In 1518, Božidar Ljubavić sent his sons, Đurađ and hieromonk Teodor, to Božidar Vuković in Venice to learn the art of printing before purchasing a printing press for Gorazde. The Ljubavić brothers procured a press and began printing a hieratikon (priest's service book), copies of which had been completed by 2 October 1519 either in Venice or at the Church of Saint George, built by Stjepan Vukčić Kosača, near Goražde. After Đurađ Ljubavić died in Gorazde on March 1519, it is unclear whether his brother transported the press to Goražde before or after finishing the work on the hieratikon. Because members of the Ljubavić family were from Goražde, they brought the printing press to their hometown. At the Church of Saint George, Đurađ and Teodor organized the Goražde printing house, which produced, beside the hieratikon, two more books in Church Slavonic of the Serbian recension: a Psalter in 1521, and a small euchologion in 1523. Books were printed by Božidar's grandson Dimitrije after being edited by hieromonk Teodor, his uncle.

== Early life ==
When his father died on 12 March 1519, Dimitrije was taken by his mother from Venice to the Kingdom of Candia (Crete), then under Venetian rule. When still young he came to Chios, where he was taught Old Greek and Latin. He also received an extensive religious education while at the Academy of "Janus Lascaris" becoming initiated in the questions of Eastern Orthodox and Roman Catholic theology. There he met Iacob Heraclid, who pretended to be the legitimate heir of Serbian despots and prince in exile of Samos and Paros. Heraclid was a picturesque person of dubious origin, cousin of another Greek adventurer by the name of James Diassorin. (As fate would have it, Dimitrije would meet up with Heraclid many years later, then known as Despot Voda, who single-handedly attempted to impose the Reformation in the heart of Eastern Europe after becoming a self-styled despot of Romania from 1561 to 1563). After completing his studies at the Lascaris academy, Dimitrije joined hieromonk Teodor Ljubavić, his uncle in Venice, where he learned the family's printing trade.

== From Goražde to Târgoviște ==
In 1544, the printing press was transported from Goražde to Târgoviște, the capital of Wallachia, thus becoming the second such facility in the territory of present-day Romania. Its relocation (and reactivation) was accomplished by Dimitrije Ljubavić, Božidar's grandson, who brought with him Hierodeacon Mojsije. In Târgoviște, Dimitrije printed a euchologion at the beginning of 1545, and an apostolarium in 1547. This was all done under the auspices of Serbian-born Metropolitan Anania of Wallachia at the time.

== Travels ==
After Dimitrije Ljubavić and his apprentices Opar and Petar completed printing "Apostol" in Targoviste in 1547, Dimitrije left for Constantinople, where he printed books for the Ecumenical Patriarchate of Constantinople for the next three years. From there he went to Mount Athos and printed more books at Hilandar and other island monasteries such as Docheiariou, Osiou Gregoriou monastery, Agiou Pavlou monastery, Dionysiou Monastery, Zograf monastery, and Koutloumousiou for more than two years.

On his return to Transylvania in 1552, Dimitrije Ljubavić not only took up responsibility for running a school in Brasov but also worked as a writer, printer, publisher, and illustrator of books. He also became a member of the town council. He continued to cultivate his humanist network of connections with the Lutherans and his own Orthodox faithful, preserving his good relations with leading figures at the residence of Metropolitan Anania (Branković) of Ungaro-Wallachia, who reigned as hierarch from 1544 to 1558. Ljubavić also helped German painter Valentin Wagner (1610-1655) compile and publish an Orthodox Catechesis in 1556. The town's judge, Johannes Benkner, and Johannes Honter's political patron before he died in 1549, also supported attempts to print text using the Cyrillic alphabet, and books were subsequently printed in both Slavonic-Serbian and in Romanian.

In 1556 a Church Slavonic printing press was established by Saxons Protestants in Şcheii Braşovului, a neighborhood of Brasov, where books were printed in Serbian (Slavonic) and Romanian in Cyrillic font. It was here that the new press printed Octotechos by Oprea, one of Ljubavić's early apprentices, along with Romanian deacon Coresi.

== Reformation: Lutherans and Serbs ==
The spreading of the Reformation in Europe during the 16th century did not avoid the territory of Transylvania, Wallachia, and Moldavia (now all three parts of Romania). Reformation ideas arrived in Wallachia from Hungary, Germany, Venice, Carniola, and Carinthia. German noblemen, clerks, and military officers also played an important role in spreading the ideas of the Reformation at the grassroots level. Wallachia was in a very difficult situation in the 16th century. Most of the provinces were under Turkish occupation, and all efforts were focused on defending the country. As a result, the Turks played a role in allowing the changes of the Reformation to take hold in most parts of Transylvania, including Brașov and Târgoviște. In spite of a large number of renowned Protestant intellectuals who came from other lands, Protestantism did not have a profound impact on the people in Wallachia, only for that moment in time.

It would seem that the reform movement, as understood by Dimitrije Ljubavić and his contemporaries, was in the broadest sense—catholic/universal—a trend happening in Western and now Eastern Europe. His relations with the Protestant group of Urach, led by Hans von Ungnad, in 1561, for a possible printing of Protestant books in Church Slavonic (Serbian recension) may constitute a partial chapter because it is an aborted business, but whose importance for the history of the reforms among the Serbs and Romanians is nevertheless indisputable.

Well-aware that the newly established South Slavic Bible Institute needed the collaboration of some Orthodox in the translation of Protestant literature, Primož Trubar and Stjepan Konzul Istranin engaged Matija Popović and Jovan Maleševac for some time in Urach. But they were very disappointed when the plan to bring to Tübingen Dimitrije Ljubavić could not be realized. Possibly for the same reasons that his countryman Matthias Flacius was prevented from joining the press at Urach, near Tübingen.

At this time, Dimitrije Ljubavić was the first secretary to the voivode of Wallachia Alexandru Lăpuşneanu and then spent more than three years at the Patriarchate of Constantinople as a deacon supervising the printing of books. After having probably become acquainted in Transylvania with Peter Petrovics, one of Temesvar's most influential magnates and a fervent supporter of the Reformation, he left for northern Hungary, where in Eperjes (Presov, Slovakia) he visits the governor of the city, Sigismund Tordai-Gelous (1518-1569). There, armed with a letter of introduction from Tordai-Gelous, Ljubavić leaves Presov in May 1559 for Wittenberg, where he met David Chytraeus and his teacher Philip Melanchthon and became familiar with the Augsburg Confession in a Greek version. Melanchthon drafted a letter for Patriarch Joasaph II of Constantinople, which Dimitrije translated into Greek, which read as follows: "I send you a Greek Version of the 'Augsburg Confession', which was published without my advice. However, I approve the style and have sent it to Constantinople by a man of learning, a dean of that city, who has been our guest during the whole summer. He relates that there were many churches in Asia, in Thrace and the neighboring countries but they have been gradually diminished by oppression and bondage...." The learned Orthodox Serb cleric, who was called Ućeni Srb, Dimitrije Serb (The learned Serb, Demetrius Serb), carried Melanchthon's letter to the Ecumenical Patriarch of Constantinople calling for a Lutheran-Orthodox "unity of all true Christian communities." There was no response from the Patriarch whatsoever. Dimitrije wrote to Melanchthon, giving him an account of his journey to Constantinople dated 15 October 1559. For a short time, Dimitrije was able to work on this plan when a friend from the past, Iacob Heraclid, suddenly became ruler of Moldavia. Heraclid, while in exile in Germany, was won over by Melanchthon to the Reformation. The Reformation had a significant impact on Brasov. During the 16th century, Brasov was divided between Hungary and Turkey. As a result of the ambiguous political situation and the territorial division of the peninsula, the Reformation came here from three different directions: Venice, which was for a short while particularly favorable toward Reformation ideas; Wittenberg, where especially German merchants were very active; and from Carniola. Several Serbian printers remained loyal to the Serbian Orthodox Church, but they collaborated with the Lutherans and Calvinists to produce more books (with the advent of the printing press). That collaboration contributed to the spreading of the Reformation in Romania, Hungary, and Austria. Dimitrije Ljubavić, therefore, took part in assisting the Protestants to print catechisms in the Romanian and Serbian languages.

Iacob Heraclid made Lutheranism the state Church, offending the native Eastern Orthodox who viewed him as an iconoclast due to his rhetoric against images, even though he did not, in fact, destroy any icons. This, together with Despot's decision to marry another foreigner (a Pole), new and increased taxes and the omnipotence of his foreign retinue, led to a boyar conspiracy instigated by high dignitary Ștefan Tomșa. In the meantime, Heraclid's postponement of debt payments angered Albert Łaski. Faced with a large-scale rebellion, Heraclid retreated to the fortress in Suceava and withstood a three-month siege. At the end of it, Despot Voda was captured and was struck to death with a mace by Tomșa himself. So too, Dimitrije Ljubavić's fate was sealed when the previous monarch regained the throne and took revenge on Ljubavić for printing Protestant books, thinking that he had abandoned Orthodoxy for Protestantism.

Dimitrije Ljubavić was eventually incarcerated and killed.

== See also ==
- Božidar Vuković
- Božidar Goraždanin
- Đurađ Crnojević
- Hieromonk Makarije
- Hieromonk Mardarije
- Hegumen Mardarije
- Vićenco Vuković
- Trojan Gundulić
- Andrija Paltašić
- Jakov of Kamena Reka
- Jerolim Zagurović
- Bartolomeo Ginammi who followed Zagurović's footsteps reprinting Serbian books.
- Stefan Paštrović
- Inok Sava
