= Hegumen Mardarije =

Serbian monk and printer (16th century)

- Born: Vraneši, Sanjak of Bosnia, Ottoman Empire
- Died: Bogovađa monastery
- Occupations: monk, printer and editor
- Known for: being one of the first printer of srbulje (books on Serbian language)

Hegumen Mardarije (Serbian Cyrillic: Игумен Мардарије; fl. 1543–45) was a Serbian Orthodox monk and one of the first printers of Serbian language books.

Mardarije received his education in the Monastery of the Holy Trinity of Pljevlja. To save its liturgical books and other valuables, he moved to Banja Monastery and became its hegumen. In 1543, he and two monks from Mileševa monastery travelled to Venice to buy the printing press and bring it to Mileševa to establish the Mileševa printing house.

== Early life ==
He was a Serb from Podrinje, who descended from Vraneši, Sokolac, Sanjak of Bosnia, Ottoman Empire (modern day Republika Srpska, Bosnia and Herzegovina).

Mardarije was educated in the Monastery of the Holy Trinity of Pljevlja. When he learned that the Ottomans were going to destroy Ljuboviđa Church in Pavino Polje, he took liturgical books and other valuables and transported them to Banja Monastery using six loaded horses.

== Mileševa printing house ==
In 1543, Mardarije was a hegumen of the Banja Monastery near Priboj when Todor Ljubavić, a monk in Mileševa and son of Božidar Ljubavić, was sent to Venice to join his brother, Đurađ, and to buy a printing press for the monastery. Todor was accompanied by the Mileševa monk Sava and by Mardarije. At that time, Banja Monastery was a seat of the metropolitan bishop while Mileševa was the richest monastery of Dabar eparchy. That is why those two monasteries were given the task to finance and organize establishing of the printing house in Mileševa and why Mardarije travelled to Venice together with monks from Mileševa. The Mileševa printing house was operational in period 1544–1557. Three books were printed in it, Psalter (Псалтир, 1544), Breviary (Требник, 1545) and another Psalter (1557). Psalter of 1544 was edited and prepared by Mardarije and Teodor Ljubavić, based on 1519–20 Psalter of Božidar Vuković.

In 1545, Mardarije went to Bogovađa near Lajkovac and rebuilt it. An engraved plate commemorates this rebuilding and mentions Mardarije and Vraneši as his fatherland.

== Misidentification with hegumen Mardarije ==
In many earlier sources, Hegumen Mardarije, who was hegumen of the Banja Monastery, is misidentified with Hieromonk Mardarije who was also a printer, but in Mrkšina crkva printing house and Belgrade printing house. Taking into consideration that Mardarije of Mrkšina crkva never mentioned in his books his much higher position of the hegumen of Banja Monastery, it was concluded that Hegumen Mardarije and Hieromonk Mardarije were two different people.

== See also ==
- Božidar Vuković
- Božidar Goraždanin
- Đurađ Crnojević
- Stefan Marinović
- Hieromonk Makarije
- Hieromonk Mardarije
- Vićenco Vuković
- Hieromonk Pahomije
- Trojan Gundulić
- Andrija Paltašić
- Jakov of Kamena Reka
- Bartolomeo Ginammi who followed Zagurović's footsteps reprinting Serbian books.
- Dimitrije Ljubavić
- Inok Sava

== Sources ==
- Ćirković, Sima (2004). The Serbs. Malden: Blackwell Publishing. ISBN 9781405142915.
