= Stefan Marinović (printer) =

Serbian printer (16th century)

- Стефан Мариновић
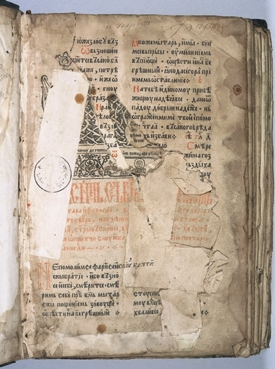
- A page of "Posni triod", book printed by Stefan Marinović in Venice 1561
- Born: Scutari, Republic of Venice (modern Shkodër, Albania)
- Other name: Stefan of Scutari
- Occupation: printer
- Known for: being one of the earliest printers of Cyrillic books

Stefan Marinović (Serbian Cyrillic: Стефан Мариновић; fl. 1561–63), also known as Stefan of Scutari (Serbian: Стефан Скадранин, romanized: Stefan Skadranin) was a 16th-century Serb printer from Scutari. He printed his books first in Venice and then in Scutari. Marinović always emphasized that he was "of the city of Scutari" (Serbian: од града Скадра, romanized: od grada Skadra).

== Venice ==
Marinović printed his first book in printing house of Vićenco Vuković. It was the first part of Triod titled Posni Triod. Vuković rented his printing shop to other printers who were, like Marinović in his first book, obliged to print Vuković's name on the book's covers.

Typographers who worked at printing house of Vićenco Vuković included Hieromonk Pahomije, Hierodeacon Mojsije, priests Genadije and Teodosije and laity like Marinović and Jakov Krajkov.

== Scutari ==
Marinović built a printing house in Scutari in 1563. The second book he published was, according to its prologue, printed in Scutari. This book printed in Scutari was linked to the Venice issued by its style while its graphic was poor. It was printed on paper and had 224 pages.

Marinović brought a skillful printer Camillo Zanetti with him to Scutari where he completed Triod by printing its remaining part (Serbian: Cvetni Triod). Because Marinović used similar typography as Vićenco Vuković some authors believe that there is a possibility that he actually did not print his last book in Scutari, but in Venice. Other authors explain that he used typography similar to Vuković's simply because he liked it and ordered similar one to be made for his book printed in Scutari.

Marinović was chronologically the third publisher of Cyrillic books in Venice.

== See also ==
- Božidar Vuković
- Božidar Goraždanin
- Đurađ Crnojević
- Hieromonk Makarije
- Hieromonk Mardarije
- Hegumen Mardarije
- Vićenco Vuković
- Hieromonk Pahomije
- Trojan Gundulić
- Andrija Paltašić
- Jakov of Kamena Reka
- Bartolomeo Ginammi who followed Zagurović's footsteps reprinting Serbian books.
- Dimitrije Ljubavić
- Stefan Paštrović
- Inok Sava
- Teodor Račanin

== Bibliography ==
- Posni Triod, 1561, Venice
- Триод' цвěтный [Triod' cvětnie]. Скендери: Камило Занети. 1563.

== Sources ==
- Ćirković, Sima (2004). The Serbs. Malden: Blackwell Publishing. ISBN 9781405142915.
