= Jakov of Kamena Reka =

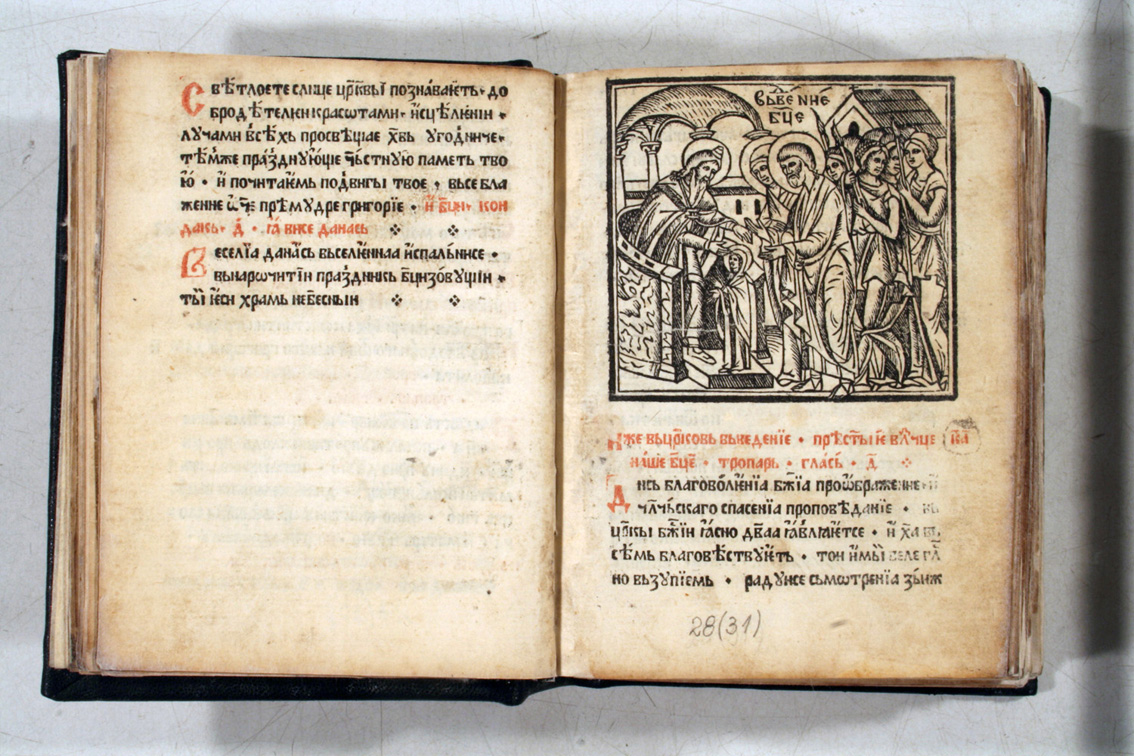
- A page from the Book of Hours printed by Jakov
- Born: 16th century
- Other names: Kamenče or Osogovac
- Occupation: printer
- Known for: one of the first printers of Cyrillic books

Jakov of Kamena Reka (Macedonian: Јаков од Камена Река, romanized: Jakov od Kamena Reka, Serbian: Јаков из Камене реке, romanized: Jakov iz Kamene reke; literally: 'Jakov from Kamena Reka'; fl. 1564–72) or Yakov Kraykov (Bulgarian: Яков Крайков), was a Venetian printer. The information about his life is scarce. It is known he was from a former village called Kamena Reka (literally: 'Stone River'), according to him near the town of Kolasia, in Osogovo, Macedonia.

It is assumed that the village could be Makedonska Kamenica in present-day North Macedonia, or Kamenichka Skakavitsa, in present-day Bulgaria, both placed in an area in Osogovo called Kamenitsa. However, near the town of Kyustendil, then called Kolasia is Kamenichka Skakavitsa. His family members had a long tradition of being Christian priests. In his youth Kraikov was a copyist of Church Slavonic books in the Osogovo Monastery "St. Joakim Osogovski". Then he went to Sofia, where in a local Church school, Kraikov deepened his literary knowledge.

Afterwards, he set off through Kyustendil and Skopje to Venice. It is assumed that Kraikov worked on his way in Gračanica monastery where a printing press was opened. He was among the first printers of Cyrillic books. Kraikov reached Venice around 1564 or 1565 where he worked in the Vuković printing house, established by Božidar Vuković and inherited by his son Vićenco Vuković. In 1566 (in period of only three and a half months) he printed the Book of hours ("Casoslov") of 710 pages on the printing press of Vićenco Vuković. It was printed in Serbian recension of the Church Slavonic language. To print this book Jakov used old, already worn out, sorts. He had at disposal Vuković's matrix and was prepared to cast new letters but he obviously failed to do it. This book is described in some sources as the first Bulgarian/Macedonian printed book.

In 1570 Jakov worked in the printing press of Jerolim Zagurović where he printed a Prayer book. In 1571 Jakov again worked in Vuković printing house, where Stefan Marinović also worked before him. In 1597 this printing house was taken over by Italian printers (Bartolomeo Ginammi, Marco Ginammi, Giovanni Antonio Rampazetto, Francesco Rampazetto, Georgio Rampazetto, Camillo Zanetti) and its printing press was operational for additional 70 years.

== See also ==
- Božidar Vuković
