= Serbian printing =

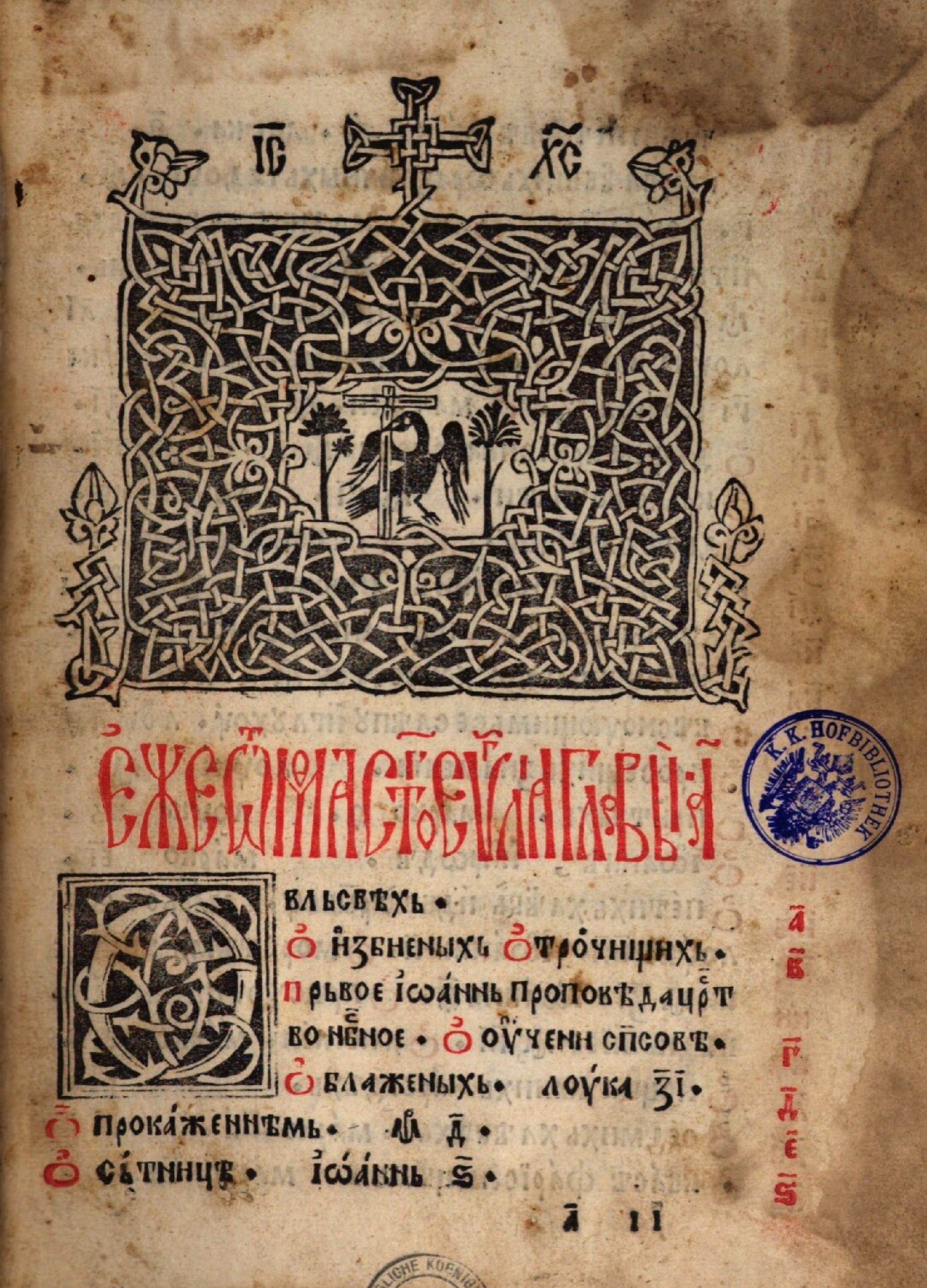
A page from the Belgrad Four Gospels printed at the Belgrade printing house (1552)

Serbian printing refers to the history of printing among Serbs, both in Serbia and in other regions, including the Serbian diaspora. In its early stages, from the end of the 15th century to the middle of the 17th century, the development of Serbian printing was marked by the use of Serbian Church Slavic language and Old Serbian Cyrillic alphabet, and later by the use of literary Slavonic-Serbian language, up to the beginning of the 19th century, when the modern Serbian language and Serbian Cyrillic alphabet were standardized (Vuk's reform).

The first modern state printing house, the Serbian Printing House, was established in 1832, in Belgrade, then the capital city of the Principality of Serbia.

== Printing houses ==
Early modern period

- The first Serbian mechanical printing press was recorded in Obod in 1492. The remains of the medieval town of Obod are located on a dominant hill that rises above the upper course of the Crnojevica River.
- Crnojević printing house (1493–1496)
- Vuković printing house (1519/1520—1521) and (1536–1540)
- Goražde printing house (1519–1523)
- Rujno Monastery printing house (1537)
- Luka Primojević
- Gračanica printing house (1539)
- Mileševa printing house (1544–1557)
- Belgrade printing house (1552)
- South Slavic Bible Institute where Jovan Maleševac and Matija Popović worked as translators (1561–1565)
- Mrkšina crkva printing house (1562–1566)
- Skadar printing house (1563)
- Zagurović printing house (1569–1570)
- Rampazetto and Heirs (1597–1616) published in Serbian Cyrillic type
- Marco and Bartolo Ginammi (1614) published in Serbian Psaltir s posledovanjem (Psalter and Additions) in Venice in 1636.
- Trojan Gundulić
- Hieromonk Pahomije
- Hieromonk Makarije
- Josef von Kurzböck printing house, in Vienna, Cyrillic works, from 1771 until 1792, until the sale to Stefan von Novaković
- Stefan von Novaković's printing house, in Vienna, printed and published books until 1796, until the sale to the University of Pest
- Srbulje
- Radoslav's Gospel

== See also ==
- Serbian literature
- Serbian Church Slavic language

== Sources ==
- Andolfo, Alessandra (2019). "Words and Swords: The Liturgical Printed Books for the Serbs through the 15th and 16th Centuries". Słowiańszczyzna wielowyznaniowa w dawnych wiekach. Kraków: Księgarnia Akademicka. pp. 55–72. Archived from the original on 2024-08-15.
- Bojanin, Stanoje (2021). "The Byzantine Penitential Nomocanon in the Serbian and South Slavic Early Modern Printed and Manuscript Book" (PDF). Byzanz und das Abendland VII. Studia Byzantino-Occidentalia. Budapest: Eötvös József Collegium. pp. 31–49. Archived from the original (PDF) on 2025-03-01.
- Ćirković, Sima (2004). The Serbs. Malden: Blackwell Publishing. ISBN 9781405142915.
- Fin, Monica (2018). "Libri serbi a Venezia fra XVI e XVIII secolo". Кирило-методиевски студии. 26: 132–158.
- Ivić, Pavle; Pešikan, Mitar (1995). "Serbian printing". The History of Serbian Culture. Edgware: Porthill Publishers. pp. 137–145.
- Lazić, Miroslav A. (2016). "Serbian Printed Book Decoration in the 15th and 16th Centuries: Centres and Creative Production". Sacral art of the Serbian lands in the Middle Ages. Belgrade: Serbian National Committee of Byzantine Studies. pp. 485–493.
- Lazić, Miroslav A. (2018). "Venice and Editions of Early Serbian Printed Books". Thesaurismata. 48: 161–192.
- Lazić, Miroslav A. (2020). "Between an Imaginary and a Historical Figure: Božidar Vuković's Professional Identity". Ricerche slavistiche. Nuova serie. 3 (63): 141–156. Archived from the original on 2022-01-26.
- Pantić, Miroslav (1992). "I libri serbi e croati e attività tipografica a Venezia". Il libro nel bacino adriatico (secc. XV-XVIII). Firenze: Olschki. pp. 51–64.
- Pelusi, Simonetta (2000). "Il libro liturgico veneziano per serbi e croati fra Quattro e Cinquecento". Le civiltà del libro e la stampa a Venezia: Testi sacri ebraici, cristiani, islamici dal Quattrocento al Settecento. Padova: Il Poligrafo. pp. 43–52.
- Polomac, Vladimir R. (2022). "Serbian Early Printed Books from Venice: Creating Models for Automatic Text Recognition using Transkribus". Scripta & e-Script. 22: 11–29.
- Polomac, Vladimir R.; Rabus, Achim (2024). "Serbian Early Printed Books from Venice: Quantitative Approach to Orthographic Variations". Studi Slavistici. 21 (2): 37–60. Archived from the original on 2025-05-24.
- Samardžić, Radovan; Duškov, Milan, eds. (1993). Serbs in European Civilization. Belgrade: Nova, Serbian Academy of Sciences and Arts, Institute for Balkan Studies. ISBN 9788675830153.
- Savić, Aleksandar Z. (2026). "Presses de résistance: Serbian Book Printing between Venice, the Romanian Principalities, and the Ottoman Empire (Late 15th–Mid-16th Century)". The Role of Italian Presses in Early Arabic Printing. Berlin: Walter de Gruyter. pp. 3–50.
- Stojanović, Jelica R. (2020). The development path of the Serbian language and script (PDF). Podgorica: Matica srpska. Archived from the original on 2024-08-15.
