= Mojsije of Dečani =

Ottoman printer

Mojsije
- Born: Budimlja, Ottoman Empire (modern-day Montenegro)
- Occupations: Orthodox priest and printer
- Years active: fl. 1536–1545
- Known for: one of the first Ottoman printers

Mojsije of Dečani (Serbian: Мојсије Дечанац, romanized: Mojsije Dečanac; fl. 1536–1545) was a printer of srbulje liturgical books and Orthodox hierodeacon.

== Biography ==
Mojsije was born to a Serbian family in Budimlja, part of the Sanjak of Scutari of the Ottoman Empire (modern-day Montenegro). He took monastic vows and was a monk at the monastery of Visoki Dečani (in Kosovo).

In the period of 1536–1538, Mojsije was a printer at the Vuković printing house in Venice, Republic of Venice. Besides Mojsije, typographers who worked at the printing house of Vićenco Vuković included also Hieromonk Pahomije, priests Genadije and Teodosije, and laity like Stefan Marinović and Jakov Krajkov.

In 1536, Mojsije printed Zbornik za putnike and in 1537, he participated in printing of the Octoechos. In 1538, Mojsije printed the most luxurious and lengthiest edition of Praznični minej.

When Dimitrije Ljubavić went to Târgoviște in Wallachia he brought with him Mojsije. In 1545, Mojsije, now a hieromonk, printed the first book in Ljubavić's printing house.

== Annotations ==
In Serbian, he is simply known with his monastic rank as "Hierodeacon Mojsije" (Serbian: јерођакон Мојсије, romanized: jerođakon Mojsije). His name translated into English is "Mojsije of Dečani" (Мојсије Дечанац, Mojsije Dečanac). He is also scarcely called "Mojsije of Budimlja" (Мојсије Будимљанин, Mojsije Budimljanin).

== See also ==
- Đurađ Crnojević
- Stefan Marinović
- Hieromonk Makarije
- Hieromonk Mardarije
- Hegumen Mardarije
- Božidar Vuković
- Vićenco Vuković
- Hieromonk Pahomije
- Trojan Gundulić
- Andrija Paltašić
- Jakov of Kamena Reka
- Bartolomeo Ginammi who followed Zagurović's footsteps reprinting Serbian books.
- Dimitrije Ljubavić, Božidar Goraždanin's grandson
- Inok Sava
- Stefan Paštrović

== Sources ==
- Aćimović, Dragoljub; Đorđević, Milivoje (1987). Štamparstvo u Užičkom kraju, 1537-1987: povodom 450 godina Rujanske štamparije (in Serbian). Dimitrije Tucović.
- Cleminson, Ralph (2000). Cyrillic Books Printed Before 1701 in British and Irish Collections: A Union Catalogue. British Library. ISBN 978-0-7123-4709-9.
- Đorđić, Petar (1987). Istorija srpske ćirilice. Zavod za udžbenike i nastavna sredstva. ISBN 9788617003386.
- Matica srpska (1996). Godišnjak Biblioteke Matice srpske. Novi Sad: Matica srpska.
- Ćirković, Sima (2004). The Serbs. Malden: Blackwell Publishing. ISBN 9781405142915.
