= Goražde printing house =

Coordinates: 43.683624°N 19.001799°E

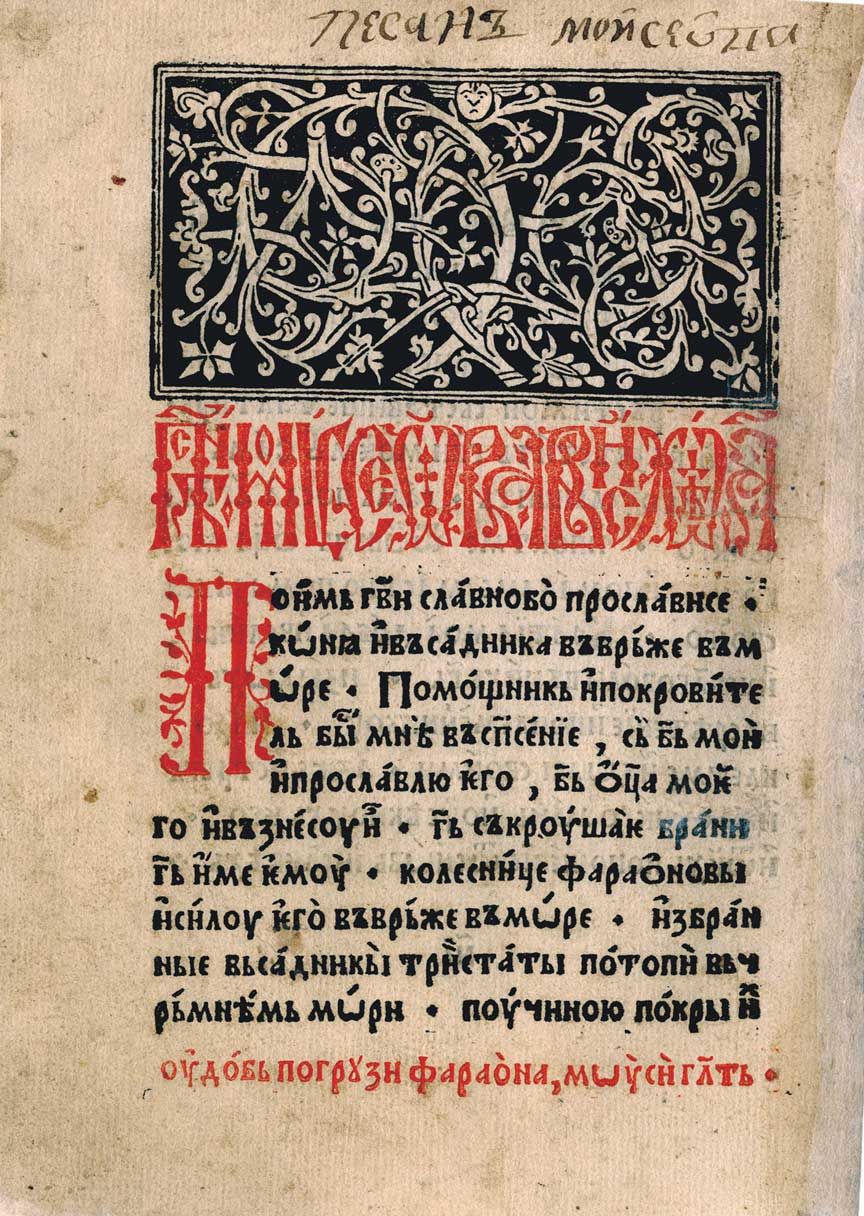
- A page of the Goražde Psalter (1521)
- Status: Defunct (1523)
- Founder: Božidar Goraždanin
- Country of origin: Ottoman Empire
- Headquarters location: Church of St. George in the village of Sopotnica (today in Novo Goražde, Republic of Srpska, Bosnia and Herzegovina)
- Key people: Đurađ and Teodor Ljubavić
- Publication types: srbulje
- Owner: Božidar Goraždanin

The Goražde printing house (Serbian: Горажданска штампарија or Goraždanska štamparija) was one of the earliest printing houses among the Serbs, and the first in the territory of present-day Bosnia and Herzegovina (then part of the Ottoman Empire). Established in 1519 in Venice, it was soon relocated to the Serbian Orthodox Church of Saint George in the village of Sopotnica near Goražde, in the Ottoman Sanjak of Herzegovina. It was founded and run by Božidar Ljubavić, also known as Božidar Goraždanin, who was a prominent merchant from Goražde. His son Teodor Ljubavić, a hieromonk of the Mileševa Monastery, managed the work of the printing house. It worked until 1523, producing three books, which are counted among the better accomplishments of early Serb printers.

== Background ==
After the printing press was invented around 1450 by Johannes Gutenberg in Mainz, Germany, the art of book printing was soon introduced in other parts of Europe. By the end of the 15th century, Venice had become a major centre of printing. In 1493, Đurađ Crnojević, the ruler of the Principality of Zeta (in present-day Montenegro), sent Hieromonk Makarije to Venice to buy a press and learn the art of printing. At Cetinje, the capital of Zeta, Makarije printed in 1494 the Cetinje Octoechos, the first incunable written in the Serbian recension of Church Slavonic. The Crnojević printing house worked until 1496, when Zeta fell to the Ottomans. In 1518, Božidar Ljubavić resided at the Mileševa Monastery, the see of a Serbian Orthodox diocese which had been part of the Kingdom of Bosnia since 1373. Mileševa and other parts of its diocese, including the town of Goražde, were located in the region of Herzegovina, which was gradually conquered by the Ottomans between 1465 and 1481.

== Printing ==
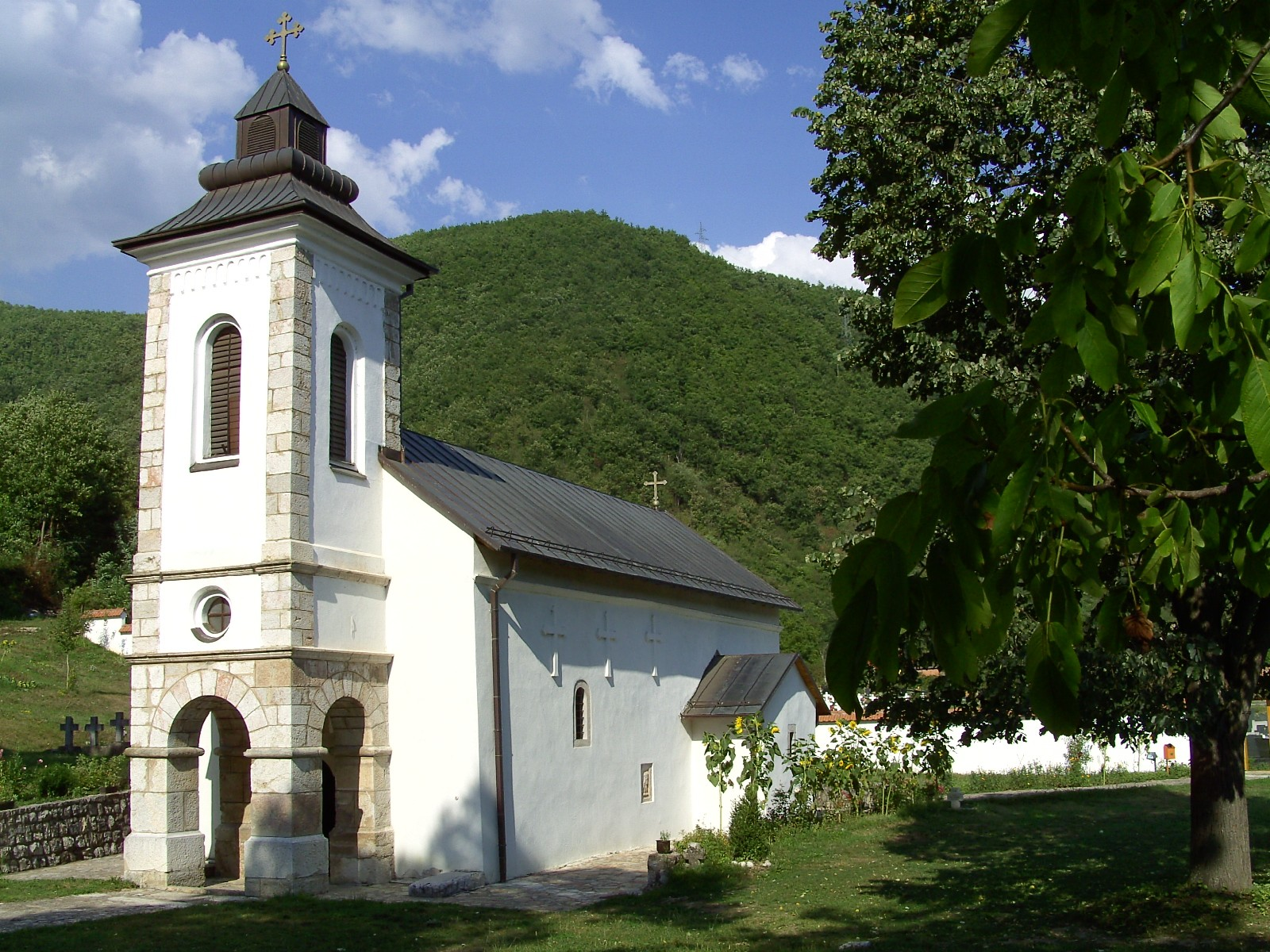
Church of St. George, Sopotnica

In the second half of 1518, Božidar Ljubavić sent his sons, Đurađ and hieromonk Teodor, to Venice to buy a printing press and to learn the art of printing. The Ljubavić brothers procured a press and began printing a hieratikon (priest's service book), copies of which had been completed by 1 July 1519 either in Venice or at the Church of Saint George near Goražde. After Đurađ Ljubavić died in Venice on 2 March 1519, it is unclear whether his brother transported the press to Goražde before or after finishing the work on the hieratikon. At the Church of Saint George, Teodor organised the Goražde printing house, which produced, beside the hieratikon, two more books in Church Slavonic of the Serbian recension: a psalter in 1521, and a small euchologion in 1523. The Goražde Psalter, containing 352 leaves, is the biggest of the three books. They were not bound at the printing house, as this job was a responsibility of book vendors. Trade was well developed in Goražde, as the town was built at the junction of three important roads, which connected it with Dubrovnik, Vrhbosna (Sarajevo), and Kosovo.

== Aftermath ==
The next printing house would not appear in Bosnia and Herzegovina until 1866, when Sopron's Printing House began its work. In 1544, the printing press was transported from Goražde to Târgoviște, the capital of Wallachia, thus becoming the second such facility in the territory of present-day Romania. Its relocation and reactivation was accomplished by Dimitrije Ljubavić, Božidar's grandson. In Târgoviște, Dimitrije printed a euchologion at the beginning of 1545, and an apostolarium in 1547. Božidar Vuković founded his printing house in Venice in 1519 or 1520, contemporaneously with the Ljubavić brothers. It worked, with interruptions, until the end of the 16th century. There were other early Serbian printing works, established in the territory of the Ottoman Empire: at the Rujan Monastery near Užice in 1529, at the Gračanica Monastery near Priština in 1539, at the Mileševa Monastery in 1546, in Belgrade in 1552, again at Mileševa in 1557, at the Mrkšina Crkva Monastery near Valjevo in 1562, and in Skadar in 1563. They were active for one to four years and produced one to three books each.

== See also ==
- Vuković printing house
- Belgrade printing house
- Mileševa printing house
- Mrkšina crkva printing house
- Rujno Monastery printing house
- Zagurović printing house
- South Slavic Bible Institute
- Božidar Vuković
- Matija Popović
- Jovan Maleševac

== Sources ==
- Barać, Dragan (2008). "Горажданска штампарија—прва међу штампаријама у Херцеговини и српским земљама 16. века". In Dragan Barać (ed.). Горажданска штампарија 1519–1523 [The Goražde Printing House 1519–1523] (in Serbian). Belgrade: National Library of Serbia; East Sarajevo: Philosophical Faculty of the University of East Sarajevo. ISBN 978-86-7035-186-8. Archived from the original on 2014-04-08.
- Čurčić, Lazar (2008). "Горажданска штампарија у Трговишту у Румунији". In Dragan Barać (ed.). Горажданска штампарија 1519–1523 [The Goražde Printing House 1519–1523] (in Serbian). Belgrade: National Library of Serbia; East Sarajevo: Philosophical Faculty of the University of East Sarajevo. ISBN 978-86-7035-186-8. Archived from the original on 2014-04-08.
- Ćirković, Sima (2004). The Serbs. Malden: Blackwell Publishing. ISBN 9781405142915.
- Biggins, Michael; Crayne, Janet (2000). "Historical Overview of Serbian Publishing". Publishing in Yugoslavia's Successor States. New York: Haworth Information Press. ISBN 978-0-7890-1046-9.
- Benac, Alojz; Lovrenović, Ivan (1980). Bosnia and Herzegovina. Sarajevo: Svjetlost.
- Fine, John Van Antwerp (1994). The Late Medieval Balkans: A Critical Survey from the Late Twelfth Century to the Ottoman Conquest. Ann Arbor, Michigan: University of Michigan Press. ISBN 0-472-08260-4.
- Fotić, Aleksandar (2005). "Belgrade: A Muslim and Non-Muslim Cultural Centre (Sixteenth–Seventeenth Centuries)". In Antonis Anastasopoulos (ed.). Provincial elites in the Ottoman Empire. Halcyon Days in Crete. Vol. 5. Rethymno: Crete University Press. ISBN 9789605242169.
- Ivić, Pavle, ed. (1995). The History of Serbian Culture. Edgware: Porthill Publishers. ISBN 9781870732314.
- Kajmaković, Zdravko (1982). "Ćirilica kod Srba i Muslimana u osmansko doba". In Alija Isaković; Milosav Popadić (eds.). Pisana riječ u Bosni i Hercegovini: od najstarijih vremena do 1918. godine [The Written Word in Bosnia and Herzegovina: From Earliest Times up to 1918] (in Serbian). Sarajevo: Oslobođenje; Banja Luka: Glas.
