= Vuković printing house =

16th century printing house

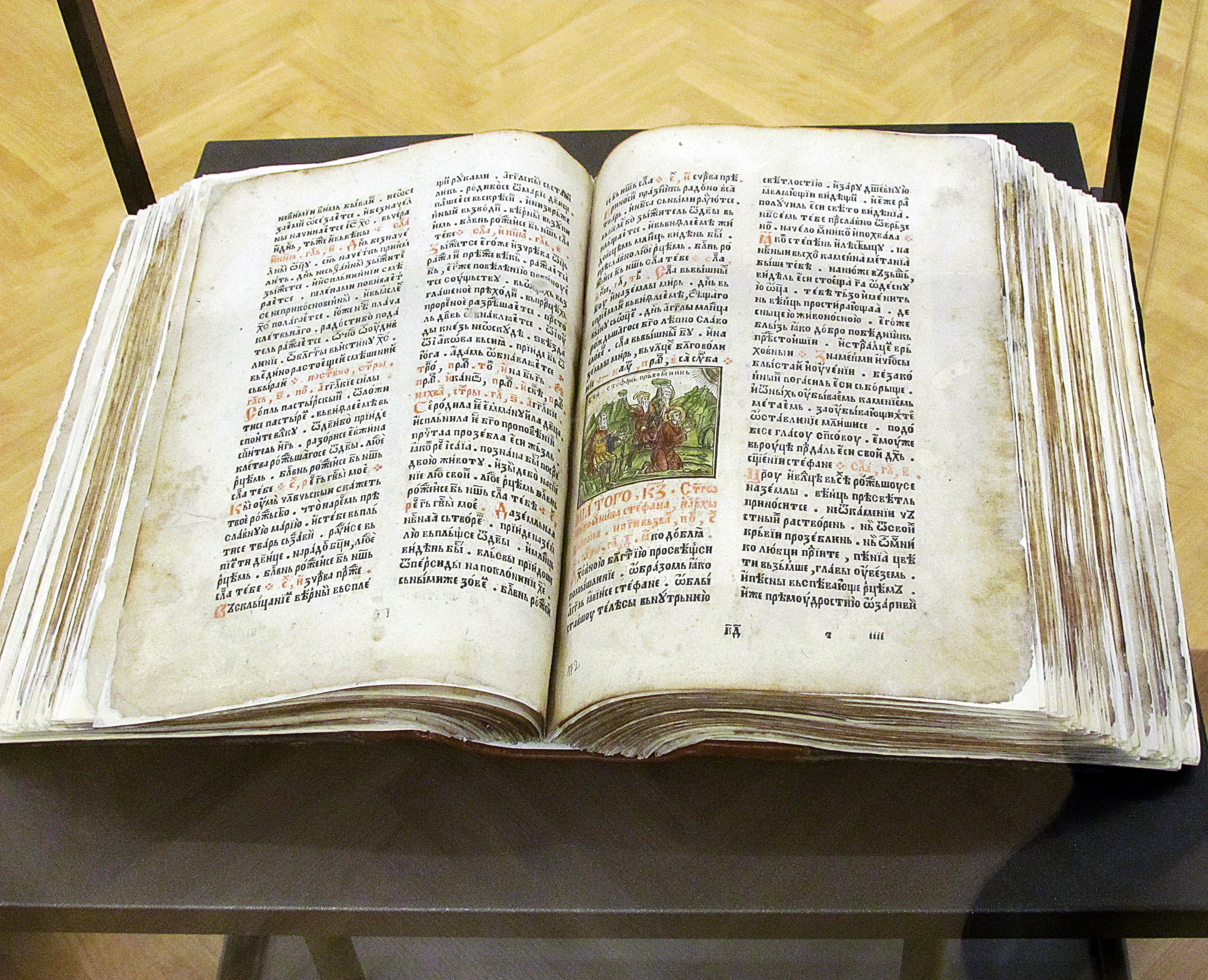
- Festal Menaion (1538) of Božidar Vuković
- Status: defunct
- Founded: 1519/20
- Founder: Božidar and Vićenco Vuković
- Country of origin: Venetian Republic
- Headquarters location: Venice
- Publication types: srbulje

The Vuković printing house (Serbian: Вуковићева штампарија) was 16th century printing house established in Venice by Božidar Vuković, and later managed by his son Vićenco Vuković.

In the first period, when printing was organized by Božidar Vuković, the editors and printers were hieromonk Pahomije of Rijeka (1519–21) and hierodeacon Mojsije of Dečani (1536–40). In 1540, Božidar's son Vićenco Vuković inherited the printing house, and since 1546 reprinted some of his father's books. In 1561, he started printing new publications, some in cooperation with Stefan Marinović, and later with Jakov of Kamena Reka.

The books printed in Vuković printing house were srbulje, early-printed liturgical books in Serbo-Slavonic (Serbian recension of Church Slavonic). Vuković printing house printed the largest number of such editions, and was the first printing house that printed srbulje on parchment. The books printed in Vuković printing house were distributed by Ragusan and other traders over the territory of Balkans under the Ottoman control, i.e. Belgrade, Nicopolis, Vidin etc. Monastery Mileševa was one of the main centers for their distribution. They were richly decorated, very popular and had significant influence on printers of books on Russian, Greek and Romanian language.

== History ==
In period 1519—1560 this printing house was owned by Božidar Vuković, who engaged printers and organized printing in it. After his death in 1560 it was inherited by Božidar's son Vićenco who continued to organize printing of the books in it.

=== Under Božidar Vuković ===
During Božidar's life this printing house was operational in two periods, in 1519/1520—1521 and in 1536—1540 and printed some of the first srbulje (Cyrillic books on Serboslavonic language, Serbian recension of Church Slavonic). In the first period 1519/1520—1521 three books were printed (Psalter, Liturgijar and Molitvenik or Zbornik). The editing and printing was done by Hieromonk Pahomije.

In second period 1536—1540 two books were printed (2nd edition of Molitvenik or Zbornik and praznični Minej or Sabornik). The most luxurious and lengthiest edition was Praznični Minej. In this second period the editing and printing was done by hierodeacon Mojsije of Dečani, who was by birth from Budimlja.

The books printed in Vuković printing house under Božidar Vuković had rich decorations made by woodcut. Mileševa (a Serbian Orthodox monastery located near Prijepolje, in southwest Serbia) was center for distribution of books printed in Vuković printing house.

=== Under Vićenco Vuković ===
In 1540, Bozidar's son Vićenco Vuković inherited the printing business. His father's books were so popular that between 1546 and 1561 Vićenco had only published reprints of his fathers books, such as Oktoih Petoglasnik, and successfully sold them.

In 1561 Vićenco engaged Stefan Marinović to operate the printing press and first book he printed was Posni Triod. In 1566 Jakov of Kamena Reka printed the Book of hours (Serbian: Часослов) of 710 pages.

Later Vićenco's plans to expand printing by initiating a wider production and distribution of Serbian Cyrillic books in Rome, with the help of cardinal Guglielmo Sirleto, did not came into fruition.

== Legacy ==
Books printed in this printing house significantly influenced, directly or indirectly, to Russian, Greek and particularly Romanian language printed books because some of Božidars woodcuts were copied by printers who printed books on these languages.

== Notes ==
1. The printing house, commonly known as the Vuković printing house (Вуковићева штампарија) is also referred to as Printing house of Božidar Vuković (Serbian: Штампарија Божидара Вуковића), Serbian printing house in Venice (Serbian: Српска штампарија у Венецији) or Božidar and Vićenzo Vuković's printing house in Venice.

== See also ==
- Serbian printing
- Crnojević printing house
- Goražde printing house
- Mileševa printing house
- Belgrade printing house
- Mrkšina crkva printing house
- Rujno Monastery printing house

== Sources ==
- Andolfo, Alessandra (2019). "Words and Swords: The Liturgical Printed Books for the Serbs through the 15th and 16th Centuries". Słowiańszczyzna wielowyznaniowa w dawnych wiekach. Kraków: Księgarnia Akademicka. pp. 55–72. Archived from the original on 2024-08-15.
- Bojović, Zlata (2015). "I libri a stampa e la loro trascrizione nella tradizione serba medievale". Libro manoscritto e libro a stampa nel mondo slavo (XV–XX sec.). Milano: Biblioteca Ambrosiana. pp. 27–35.
- Ćirković, Sima (2004). The Serbs. Malden: Blackwell Publishing.
- Fin, Monica (2018). "Libri serbi a Venezia fra XVI e XVIII secolo". Кирило-методиевски студии. 26: 132–158.
- Fotić, Aleksandar (2005). "Belgrade: a Muslim and non-Muslim cultural centre (Sixteenth-Seventeenth centuries)". Provincial Elites in the Ottoman Empire: Helcyon Days in Crete V. Rethymno: Crete University Press. pp. 51–75.
- Ivić, Pavle; Pešikan, Mitar (1995). "Serbian printing". The History of Serbian Culture. Edgware: Porthill Publishers. pp. 137–145.
- Lazić, Miroslav A. (2016). "Serbian Printed Book Decoration in the 15th and 16th Centuries: Centres and Creative Production". Sacral art of the Serbian lands in the Middle Ages. Belgrade: Serbian National Committee of Byzantine Studies. pp. 485–493.
- Lazić, Miroslav A. (2018). "Venice and Editions of Early Serbian Printed Books". Thesaurismata. 48: 161–192.
- Lazić, Miroslav A. (2020). "Between an Imaginary and a Historical Figure: Božidar Vuković's Professional Identity". Ricerche slavistiche. Nuova serie. 3 (63): 141–156. Archived from the original on 2022-01-26.
- Madaro, Nicola (2018). "Un testo liturgico greco-slavo di Božidar Vuković (1536)". Црквене студије. 15: 61–74. Archived from the original on 2024-09-10.
- Marciani, Corrado (1972). "I Vukovic tipografi-librai slavi a Venezia nel XVI secolo". Economia e Storia. 19 (3): 342–362.
- Mavroidi, Fani (1983). "I serbi e la confraternita greca di Venezia". Balkan Studies. 24 (2): 511–529. Archived from the original on 2020-03-19.
- Medaković, Dejan (1958). Grafika srpskih štampanih knjiga XV-XVII veka (in Serbian). Naučno delo.
- Pantić, Miroslav (1992). "I libri serbi e croati e attività tipografica a Venezia". Il libro nel bacino adriatico (secc. XV-XVIII). Firenze: Olschki. pp. 51–64.
- Pelusi, Simonetta (2000). "Il libro liturgico veneziano per serbi e croati fra Quattro e Cinquecento". Le civiltà del libro e la stampa a Venezia: Testi sacri ebraici, cristiani, islamici dal Quattrocento al Settecento. Padova: Il Poligrafo. pp. 43–52.
- Polomac, Vladimir R. (2022). "Serbian Early Printed Books from Venice: Creating Models for Automatic Text Recognition using Transkribus". Scripta & e-Script. 22: 11–29.
- Polomac, Vladimir R.; Rabus, Achim (2024). "Serbian Early Printed Books from Venice: Quantitative Approach to Orthographic Variations". Studi Slavistici. 21 (2): 37–60. Archived from the original on 2025-05-24.
- Skovran, Anika (1980). "Printer Božidar Vuković". Review: Yugoslav monthly magazine. 20: 30–32.
