= Cetinje Octoechos =

Serbian Orthodox liturgical book

Cetinje Octoechos Цетињски октоих
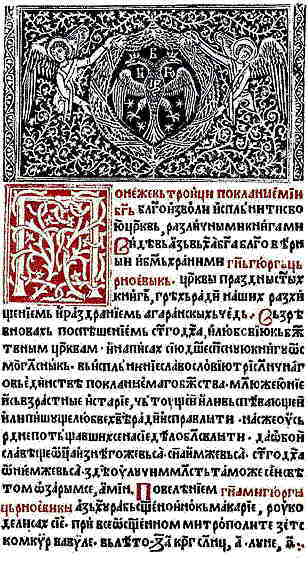
- A page of Octoechos of the First Tone (Oktoih prvoglasnik)
- Editor: Hieromonk Makarije
- Language: Serbian recension of Church Slavonic
- Published: 1494 (Crnojević printing house)
- Publication place: Principality of Zeta
- Media type: Serbian Cyrillic Srbulja
- Pages: 540

The Cetinje Octoechos (Serbian: Цетињски октоих or Cetinjski oktoih) is a Serbian Orthodox liturgical book printed in 1494 in Cetinje, the capital of the Principality of Zeta (present-day Montenegro). It is the first incunabulum written in the Serbian recension of Church Slavonic, as well as the first book printed in Cyrillic in Southeast Europe. The octoechos was produced under the direction of Hieromonk Makarije at the Crnojević printing house, which was founded in 1493 by Đurađ Crnojević, the ruler of Zeta. Printed in two instalments, its first volume contains the hymns to be sung to the first four tones of the Octoechos system of musical modes, and the hymns for the remaining four tones are included in the second volume. The two volumes are called Octoechos of the First Tone (Oktoih prvoglasnik) and Octoechos of the Fifth Tone (Oktoih petoglasnik), respectively.

== Octoechos of the First Tone ==
Octoechos of the First Tone (Oktoih prvoglasnik) was finished on 4 January 1494. There are 108 copies of this book which survived. It contains 270 leaves sized 29 x 21.6 cm. It is characterized by high quality and clean two-coloured printing, red and black, with finely formed letters. It is decorated with headpieces and initials printed from woodcuts in the spirit of the Renaissance with traces of old manuscript traditions. In the quality of its print and decoration it is considered to be at the same level as Venetian production at that time. The National Library of Montenegro "Đurđe Crnojević" in Cetinje published 600 facsimiles of Octoechos of the First Tone in 1987.

== Octoechos of the Fifth Tone ==
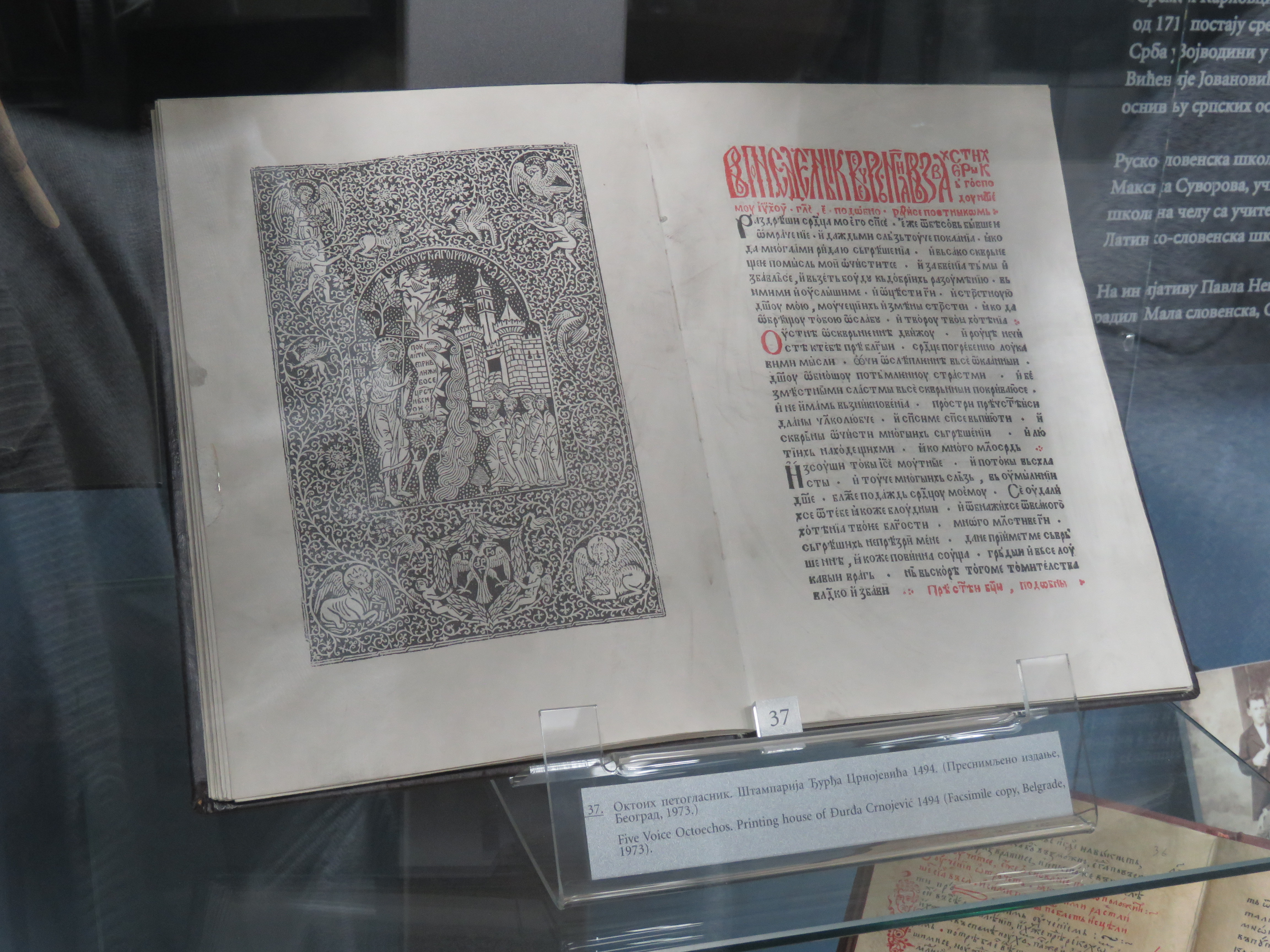
Cetinje Octoechos of the Fifth Tone (modern reprint)

Octoechos of the Fifth Tone (Oktoih petoglasnik) represents the first Serbian illustrated Serbian Cyrillic and Language mediaeval printed book and the second South Slavic incunabulum. It is preserved in fragments, the longest one containing 37 leaves. It has six woodcut illustrations, made by an artist who managed to put rather complex compositions with many characters on a relatively small space.

== See also ==
- Božidar Vuković

== Sources ==
- Ćirković, Sima (2004). The Serbs. Malden: Blackwell Publishing. ISBN 9781405142915.
- Ivić, Pavle, ed. (1995). The History of Serbian Culture. Edgware: Porthill Publishers. ISBN 9781870732314.
