= Mileševa printing house =

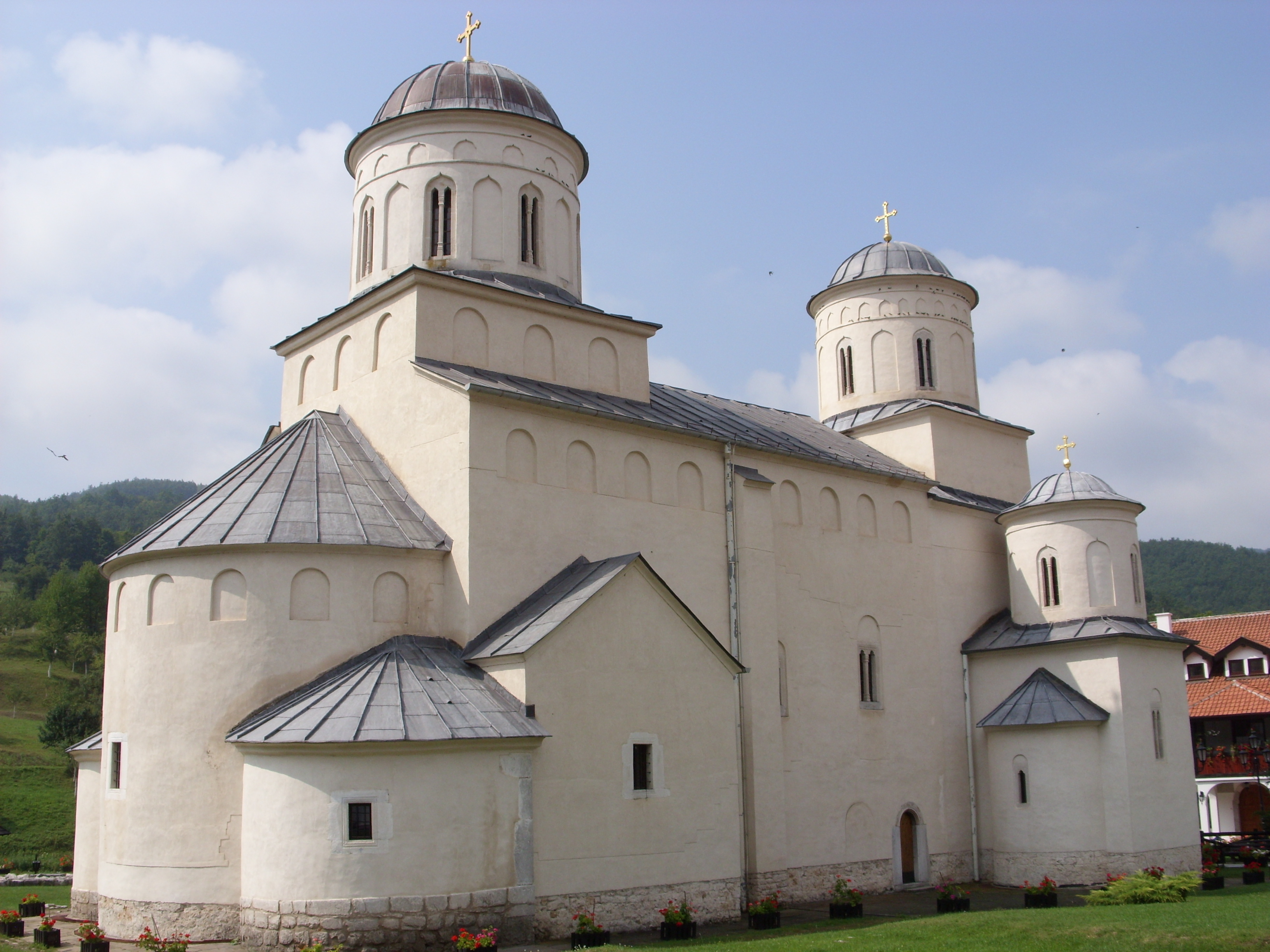
- Exterior of the monastery
- Status: defunct (1557)
- Founded: 1544
- Country of origin: Ottoman Empire
- Headquarters location: Mileševa monastery
- Key people: Hieromonk Mardarije, Hegumen Danilo
- Publication types: srbulje

The Mileševa printing house (Serbian: Милешевска штампарија) was a printing house established in 1544 in the Mileševa monastery near Prijepolje, Ottoman Empire (modern day Serbia). Three srbulje books were printed in this printing house. Two in 1544 and 1545 and one in 1557.

== Background ==
Activities connected with printing in Mileševa began when in 1518 or at the beginning of 1519 when Teodor Ljubavić, who was a hieromonk of Mileševa, travelled to Venice to learn printing skills. Ljubavić worked at Goražde printing house between 1521 and 1523. Between 1533 and 1535 Božidar Vuković visited Mileševa and concluded an agreement with Mileševa to distribute his books.

== Establishing ==
In 1543 Todor Ljubojević, a monk in Mileševa and son of Božidar, was sent to Venice to join his brother Đurađ and to buy a printing press for the monastery. He was accompanied by Mileševa monk Sava and by Mardarije who was a hegumen of the Banja Monastery near Priboj. At that time Banja Monastery was a seat of the metropolitan bishop while Mileševa was the richest monastery of Dabar eparchy. That is why those two monasteries were given the task to finance and organize establishing of the printing house in Mileševa and why Mardarije travelled to Venice together with monks from Mileševa.

== Printing ==
Mileševa printing house was operational in period 1544–1557. Three books were printed in it, Psalter (Псалтир, 1544), Breviary (Требник, 1545) and another Psalter (1557). Psalter of 1544 was edited and prepared by Mardarije and Teodor Ljubavić, based on 1519-20 Psalter of Božidar Vuković.

Psalter was edited and prepared by Mardarije and Teodor Ljubavić, based on 1519-20 Psalter of Božidar Vuković. Trebnik was printed by Deak Damjan and Milan from Obna (region around river Kolubara).

The third book was printed after a pause of twelve years. Because it was printed with different types, some sources say that two printing houses existed in Mileševa, both of them founded by the order of hegumen of Mileševa, Danilo.

== See also ==
- Goražde printing house
- Vuković printing house
- Crnojević printing house
- Belgrade printing house
- Mrkšina crkva printing house
- Rujno Monastery printing house
- Zagurović printing house
- Gračanica printing house
- Skadar printing house
- Rampazetto and heirs printing house
- South Slavic Bible Institute
- Matija Popović
- Jovan Maleševac
- Hieromonk Makarije
- Đurađ Crnojević

== Sources ==
- Ćirković, Sima (2004). The Serbs. Malden: Blackwell Publishing. ISBN 9781405142915.
