= Belgrade printing house =

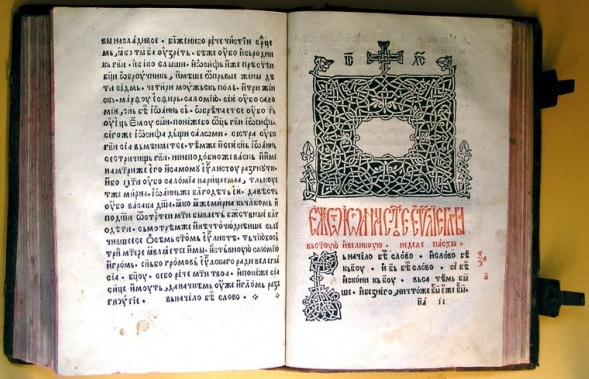
- The Four Gospels printed at the Belgrade printing house, 1552
- Status: defunct (1552)
- Founded: 1552
- Founder: Radiša Dmitrović
- Successor: Mrkšina crkva printing house
- Country of origin: Ottoman Empire (today Serbia)
- Headquarters location: Belgrade
- Key people: Trojan Gundulić; Hieromonk Mardarije
- Publication types: srbulje

The Belgrade printing house (Serbian: Београдска штампарија / Beogradska štamparija) was a printing house established by count (Serbian: knez) Radiša Dmitrović in Belgrade, Ottoman Serbia (today the capital of Serbia). It was the first printing house in Belgrade. After Dmitrović's death, the printing house was taken over by Trojan Gundulić, who organized publishing of the first and only book of this printing house, the Gospel, printed and edited in 1552 by Hieromonk Mardarije.

== Under Dmitrović ==
Count Radiša Dmitrović, a Serb nobleman and native of Herzegovina, bought the printing press and types and employed Hieromonk Mardarije as editor and printer. Some earlier sources speculated that the Belgrade in question was actually Berat in Albania or some other Belgrade on the Balkans. Dmitrović died before the first book was printed in his printing house. According to some sources, he died before the printing press he bought was even delivered to him, while some other sources say he died during the printing of the first book.

== Under Gundulić ==
After Dmitrovićs death, the printing press was received by Trojan Gundulić, a member of the noble Gundulić family, who lived in the large colony of Ragusans in Belgrade as an illegitimate son of a Ragusan nobleman. Gundulić moved the press to his house, which was located in the part of the Belgrade called Zerek, near the Bajrakli Mosque, which is today Gospodar Jevremova Street. Gundulić personally sold books in Belgrade. Gundulić did not find the printing business profitable, however, and did not continue with it.

== Aftermath ==
Hieromonk Mardarije moved the printing press from Belgrade to the Mrkšina crkva monastery and established the Mrkšina crkva printing house there. According to some sources, it was Mardarije who inspired first Dmitrović and then Gundulić to invest in the printing business and who organized all activities during the set-up of the printing house in Belgrade. A copy of The Four Gospels is kept in the treasury of the Blagoveštenje Monastery.

== See also ==
- Goražde printing house
- Vuković printing house
- Crnojević printing house
- Mileševa printing house
- Mrkšina crkva printing house
- Rujno Monastery printing house

== Sources ==
- Ćirković, Sima (2004). The Serbs. Malden: Blackwell Publishing. ISBN 9781405142915.
