= Rujno Monastery printing house =

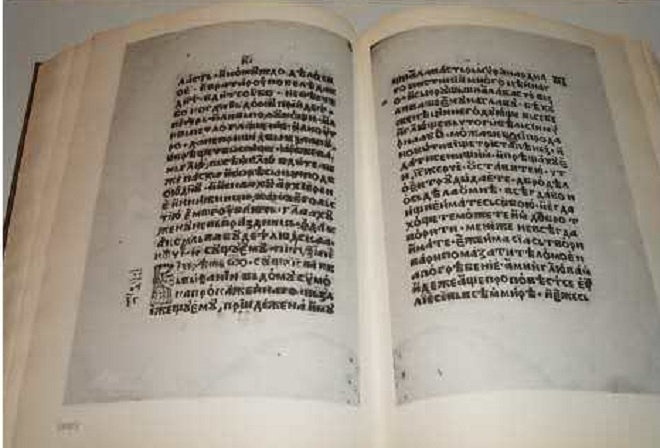
- Two pages from prototypical edition of The Rujan Four Gospels
- Status: defunct (1537)
- Founded: 1537
- Country of origin: Ottoman Empire (modern day Serbia)
- Headquarters location: village Vrutci of Rujno Župa near Užice,
- Key people: Hieromonk Teodosije
- Publication types: srbulje
- Owner: Monastery of Saint George (Rujno Monastery)

The Rujno Monastery printing house (Serbian: Штампарија манастира Рујно) was a printing house established in 1537 in the Monastery of Saint George (Rujno Monastery) in village Vrutci of Rujno Župa near Užice, Ottoman Empire (modern day Serbia). The monastery had substantial income from its nearby spa so it established the printing house. Still, this income was insufficient for metal types. That is why hieromonk Teodosije, hegumen of the monastery, and his fellow monks, made types of 250 engraved wooden plates. They printed one book in this printing house, The Rujan Four Gospels (Serbian: Рујанско Четворојеванђеље). The Ottomans burned monastery together with its printing house to prevent further printing of books. Since 1984 the remnants of this monastery are below Lake Vrutci.

== Rujno Four Gospels ==
The Rujno Monastery printing house was one of the oldest printing houses in the Balkans and the oldest printing house on the territory of modern day Serbia (then Ottoman Empire). It was established and operational in a small monastery of Saint George in village Vrutci of Rujno Župa near Užice in 1537. The monastery is also known as Rujno Monastery. Only one book was printed in Rujno Monastery printing house, The Rujan Four Gospels. It was printed by hieromonk Teodosije who used wooden types to print it. Dejan Medaković concluded that Rujno Monastery was poor so its hieromonk and printer Teodosije had to use wooden types. Some other authors believe that substantial income of monastery received from its spa actually contributed to establishment of the printing house. Medaković emphasize that this was not an advancement, but step back to older woodcut technique. For many months Teodosije carefully engraved 250 wooden plates to be used for printing. Because of the different shape of some letters it was concluded that he did not engrave all letters by himself. One book was in possession of Vuk Karadžić.

== Destruction of the printing house ==
When Ottomans received information about the existence of this printing house they burned monastery while its monks fled to Rača monastery. The remnants of the monastery were used to build madrasa in Užice. In one letter written by Vuk Karadžić in 1857 he described wide red columns of the monastery he saw in madrasa.

== Aftermath ==
The books printed in the printing house of Rujno Monastery had great influence to other nearby monasteries where they were manually transcribed. Today the exact location of the original monastery is unknown. The region where original Rujno Monastery was built is today below the surface of lake Vrutci built in 1984 for supply of Užice with potable water. New Rujno Monastery on another location was built in period 2004—2009.

== See also ==
- Goražde printing house
- Vuković printing house
- Crnojević printing house
- Belgrade printing house
- Mileševa printing house
- Mrkšina crkva printing house

== Sources ==
- Aćimović, Dragoljub; Đorđević, Milivoje (1987). Štamparstvo u Užičkom kraju, 1537-1987: povodom 450 godina Rujanske štamparije (in Serbian). Dimitrije Tucović.
- Samardžić, Radovan (1993). Istorija srpskog naroda: pt. 1-2. Srbi pod tudinskom vlashdu 1537-1699. Srpska knjiiževna zadruga.
- Đorđić, Petar (1987). Istorija srpske ćirilice (in Serbian). Zavod za udžbenike i nastavna sredstva.
- Medaković, Dejan (2006). Izabrane srpske teme: studije i prilozi (in Serbian). Beogradski izdavačko-grafički zavod.
- Institut, Geografski institut "Jovan Cvijić." (1964). Zbornik radova (in Serbian). Geografski institut "Jovan Cvijić.".
- Kulundžić, Zvonimir (1973). Gutenberg i njegovo djelo na Slavenskom jugu (in Serbian). Verlag der Gutenberg-Gesellschaft.
- Magazine (1984). Yugoslav Illustrated Magazine. Jugoslovenska Revija.
- Ćirković, Sima (2004). The Serbs. Malden: Blackwell Publishing.
