= Serbian Church Slavic =

Extinct Serbian redaction of the Church Slavic literary language

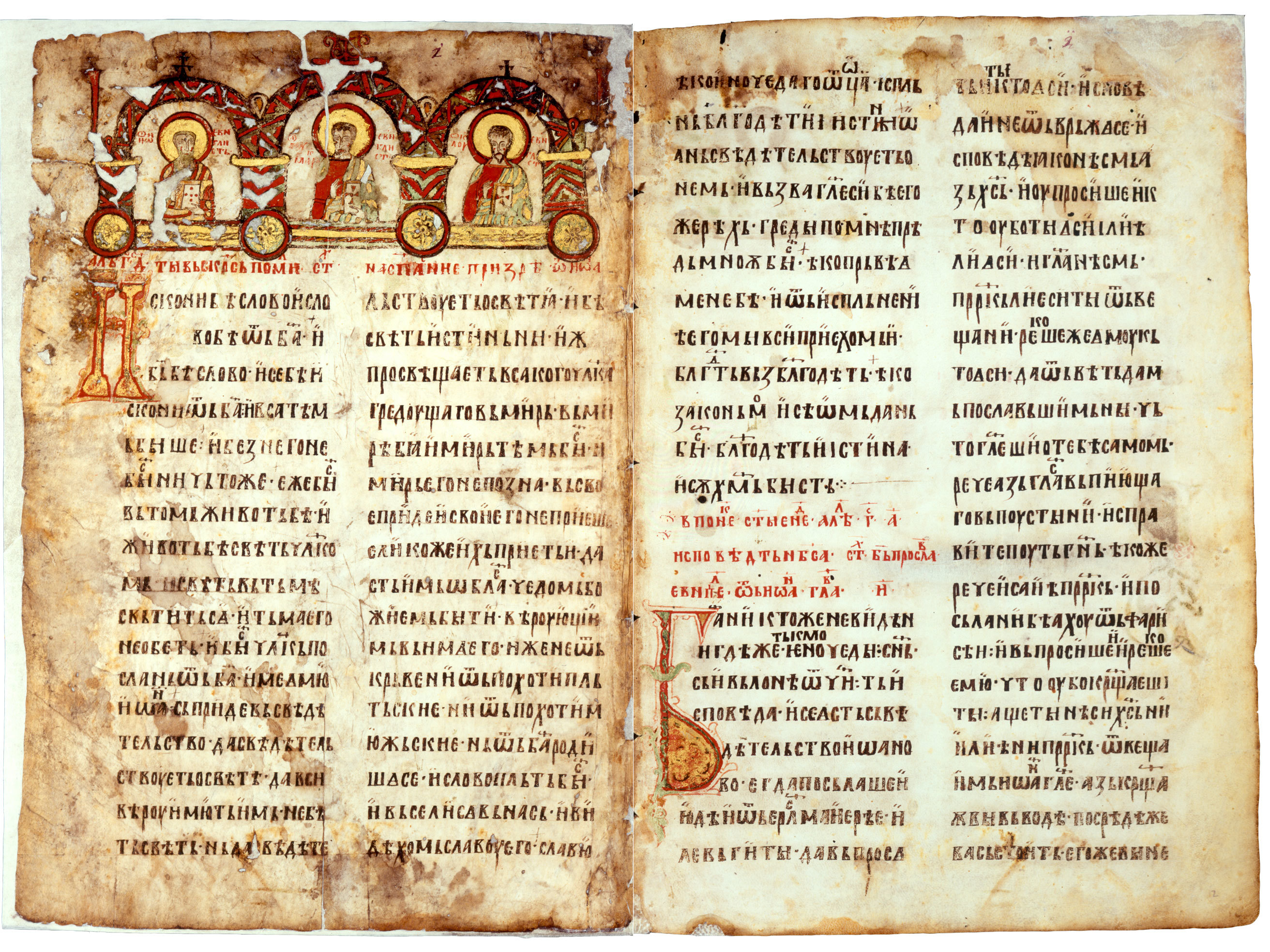
- Miroslav's Gospel from the late 12th century
- Region: Southeastern Europe
- Era: 11th to 18th century
- Language family: Indo-European: Balto-Slavic; Slavic; Church Slavic; Serbian Church Slavic
- Early form: Old Church Slavic
- Writing system: Old Cyrillic alphabet

Language codes
- ISO 639-3: –
- IETF: cu-RS

Serbian Church Slavic, also known as Serbian Church Slavonic (Serbian: српскословенски језик), was a liturgical and literary language used by the Serbs during the medieval and early modern periods, from the 11th up to the 18th century. It was a redaction of the Old Church Slavonic language, as applied under various influences of early vernacular forms of the Serbian language. It was the language of Medieval Serbian literature and early modern Serbian printing.

== Terminology ==
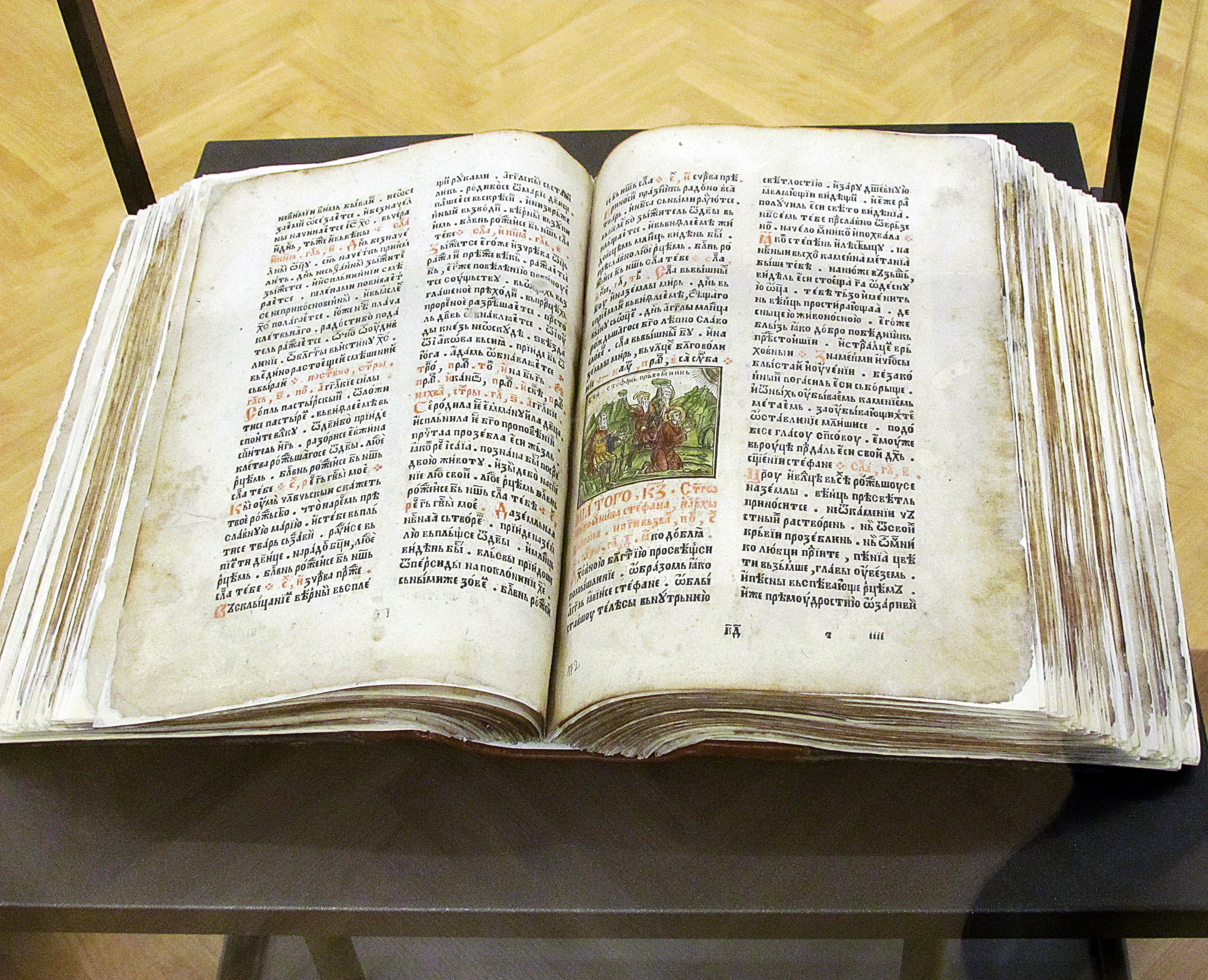
Festal Menaion, edition of the Vuković printing house (Venice, 1538)

In various scholarly sources, written in the English language, Serbian redaction or recension of the Church Slavic language is most commonly named as Serbian Church Slavic/Slavonic, or Serbian Old Slavic/Slavonic, and sometimes also as Serbian Old Church Slavic/Slavonic, or just Serbian-Slavic/Slavonic (abbreviated further as Serbo-Slavic/Slavonic), thus reflecting the variety of forms used as designations for the Old Church Slavic/Slavonic language and its redactions in general.

== History ==
During the medieval and early modern periods, the liturgical and literary use of the Old Slavic literary language among Serbs was marked by various influences from the Serbian old vernacular language, thus creating a distinctive Serbian redaction or recension of the common Old Church Slavic literary language. Liturgical and other works of the Medieval Serbian literature were created in the Serbian Church Slavic language, while old Serbian vernacular language was used mainly in private letters and various documents, particularly during the late medieval and early modern periods.

First traces of Serbian vernacular influences on the common Old Church Slavic language were recorded in liturgical works written both in the Glagolitic and Cyrillic scripts, such as the Glagolitic Codex Marianus from the 11th century, and particularly the Cyrillic Miroslav Gospel from the 12th century. Earliest written monuments, created before the 13th century, testify that the formative process that created the Serbian redaction was by that time already completed.

In Cyrillic application, it had three orthographic varieties:

- Zeta-Hum orthography, which was the oldest (used in Serbian lands until the beginning of the 13th century)
- Raška orthography, which succeeded the previous (used in Serbian lands until the first decades of the 15th century)
- Resava orthography, which originated in the early 1400s within the Resava Literary School, under the influence of Constantine of Kostenets and other educated clerics and scribes who fled to Serbia after the fall of Bulgaria (1393–1396), and promoted the introduction of forms that resembled more closely the Bulgarian redaction.

One of orthographic features characteristic for the Serbian redaction was the use of an Old Serbian letter known as djerv (Ꙉꙉ), employed for the Serbian reflexes of Proto-Slavic *tj and *dj (*t͡ɕ, *d͡ʑ, *d͡ʒ, and *tɕ)

Serbian Church Slavic language continued to be used during the early modern period, particularly in the 16th and 17th centuries, as attested by liturgical and literary works from that era, created within the Serbian Patriarchate of Peć, and those traditions continued up to the beginning of the 18th century. It was also used as the language of early modern Serbian printing, between the end of the 15th century and the middle of the 17th century.

During the Great Migrations (1690), many Serbs left Ottoman-held territories and settled in southern areas of the Kingdom of Hungary, within the Habsburg Empire. At first, the Serbian Orthodox Church continued to use the traditional Serbian Church Slavic language, but Habsburg authorities did not allow the Serbs to establish their own Cyrillic printing presses. In the same time, Serbian churches and schools received help in books and teachers from the Russian Empire, but those books were printed in the Russian Church Slavic language (synodical, or neo-Moscowian redaction). Thus, by the mid-18th century, traditional Serbian Church Slavic language was gradually replaced with Russo-Slavonic (Russian redaction of Church Slavonic) as the principal liturgical and literary language of the Serbs, and by the end of the same century, mixture of those two traditions produced a hybrid literary language known as the Slavonic-Serbian.

== See also ==
- Old Church Slavic language
- Church Slavic language
- Vukan's Gospel
- Medieval Serbian manuscripts
- Serbian Cyrillic alphabet
- History of the Serbs
- Cultural history of Serbia
- Slavonic-Serbian language

== Sources ==
- Albijanić, Aleksandar (1978). "Serbian Church Slavic Elements in 18th-Early 19th Century Vojvodina Sources". Die Welt der Slaven. 23 (2): 268–283.
- Albijanić, Aleksandar (1985). "The Demise of Serbian Church Slavic and the advent of the Slaveno-Serbski Literary Dialect". The Formation of the Slavonic literary Languages. Columbus, Ohio: Slavica Publishers. pp. 115–123. ISBN 978-0-89357-143-6.
- Andolfo, Alessandra (2019). "Words and Swords: The Liturgical Printed Books for the Serbs through the 15th and 16th Centuries". Słowiańszczyzna wielowyznaniowa w dawnych wiekach. Kraków: Księgarnia Akademicka. pp. 55–72. Archived from the original on 15 August 2024.
- Ćirković, Sima (2004). The Serbs. Malden: Blackwell Publishing. ISBN 978-1-4051-4291-5.
- Dziadul, Paweł (2025). "Cyrillic Letters and the Slavonic Tongue in the service of the Ottomans (About Attempts at Labelling the Script and the Language in 15th-16th Centuries)". Studia Środkowoeuropejskie i Bałkanistyczne. 34: 11–30. doi:10.4467/2543733XSSB.25.002.22499. Archived from the original on 30 December 2025.
- Fin, Monica (2018). "Libri serbi a Venezia fra XVI e XVIII secolo". Кирило-методиевски Студии. 26: 132–158.
- Grković-Major, Jasmina (2021). "Serbian Church Slavonic influence on the Old Serbian language". Old Church Slavonic Heritage in Slavonic and Other Languages. Praha: Nakladatelství Lidové noviny. pp. 271–279.
- Isailović, Neven G.; Krstić, Aleksandar R. (2015). "Serbian Language and Cyrillic Script as a Means of Diplomatic Literacy in South Eastern Europe in 15th and 16th Centuries" (PDF). Literacy Experiences concerning Medieval and Early Modern Transylvania. Cluj-Napoca: George Barițiu Institute of History. pp. 185–195.
- Ivić, Pavle (1995). "Standard Language as an Instrument of Culture and the Product of National History". The History of Serbian Culture. Edgware: Porthill Publishers. pp. 41–51. ISBN 978-1-870732-31-4.
- Ivić, Pavle (2024). The Serbian people and their language (PDF). Novi Sad: Matica Srpska.
- Ivić, Pavle; Pešikan, Mitar (1995). "Serbian printing". The History of Serbian Culture. Edgware: Porthill Publishers. pp. 137–145. ISBN 978-1-870732-31-4.
- Lazić, Miroslav A. (2016). "Serbian Printed Book Decoration in the 15th and 16th Centuries: Centres and Creative Production". Sacral art of the Serbian lands in the Middle Ages. Belgrade: Serbian National Committee of Byzantine Studies. pp. 485–493.
- Lazić, Miroslav A. (2018). "Venice and Editions of Early Serbian Printed Books". Thesaurismata. 48: 161–192.
- Lazić, Miroslav A. (2020). "Between an Imaginary and a Historical Figure: Božidar Vuković's Professional Identity". Ricerche slavistiche. Nuova serie. 3 (63): 141–156.
- MacRobert, Catherine Mary (2002). "The linguistic basis of textual segmentation in Serbian Church Slavonic sources of the 14th-15th centuries" (PDF). Oxford University Working Papers in Linguistics, Philology & Phonetics. 7: 207–224.
- Pantić, Miroslav (1992). "I libri serbi e croati e attività tipografica a Venezia". Il libro nel bacino adriatico (secc. XV-XVIII). Firenze: Olschki. pp. 51–64. ISBN 978-88-222-4009-5.
- Paxton, Roger V. (1981). "Identity and Consciousness: Culture and Politics among the Habsburg Serbs in the Eighteenth Century". Nation and Ideology: Essays in Honor of Wayne S. Vucinich. Boulder, Colorado: East European Monographs. pp. 101–120. ISBN 978-0-914710-89-9.
- Pelusi, Simonetta (2000). "Il libro liturgico veneziano per serbi e croati fra Quattro e Cinquecento". Le civiltà del libro e la stampa a Venezia: Testi sacri ebraici, cristiani, islamici dal Quattrocento al Settecento. Padova: Il Poligrafo. pp. 43–52.
- Polomac, Vladimir R. (2022). "Serbian Early Printed Books from Venice: Creating Models for Automatic Text Recognition using Transkribus". Scripta & E-Script. 22: 11–29.
- Polomac, Vladimir R.; Rabus, Achim (2024). "Serbian Early Printed Books from Venice: Quantitative Approach to Orthographic Variations". Studi Slavistici. 21 (2): 37–60.
- Polomac, Vladimir R. (2025). "The Serbian language in the diplomatic correspondence of the Hungarian kings and court officials in the 15th and 16th centuries: A philological perspective" (PDF). The Eternal Cycle: neighbours, allies and/or rivals: Serbo/Hungarian relations in the Middle Ages (895–1541). Belgrade-Budapest: : The Institute of History; HUN-REN Research Centre for Humanities, Institute of History. pp. 257–279.
- Savić, Aleksandar Z. (2026). "Presses de résistance: Serbian Book Printing between Venice, the Romanian Principalities, and the Ottoman Empire (Late 15th–Mid-16th Century)". The Role of Italian Presses in Early Arabic Printing. Berlin: Walter de Gruyter. pp. 3–50.
- Savić, Viktor (2016). "The Serbian Redaction of the Church Slavonic Language: From St. Clement, the Bishop of the Slavs, to St. Sava, the Serbian Archbishop" (PDF). Slověne: International Journal of Slavic Studies (in Serbian). 5 (2): 231–339.
- Samardžić, Radovan; Duškov, Milan, eds. (1993). Serbs in European Civilization. Belgrade: Nova, Serbian Academy of Sciences and Arts, Institute for Balkan Studies. ISBN 9788675830153.
- Stojanović, Jelica R. (2020). The development path of the Serbian language and script (PDF). Podgorica: Matica srpska.
