= Milka Ivić =

Serbian linguist (1923–2011)

Milka Ivić (Serbian Cyrillic: Милка Ивић; 11 December 1923 – 7 March 2011) was a Serbian linguist.

She was born in Belgrade. She took her doctorate in 1954 with the thesis Značenja srpskohrvatskoga instrumentala i njihov razvoj (The Meanings of Serbo-Croatian Instrumental and Their Development), and became a professor of Serbian and Croatian language at the University of Novi Sad. She was especially known for her book Pravci u lingvistici (published in English as Trends in Linguistics, 1965, tr. Muriel Heppel). She was a member of the Norwegian Academy of Science and Letters from 1976, a corresponding member of the Slovenian Academy of Sciences and Arts from 1983, and a member of the Serbian Academy of Sciences and Arts.

She was married to Pavle Ivić.
