= Mrkšina crkva printing house =

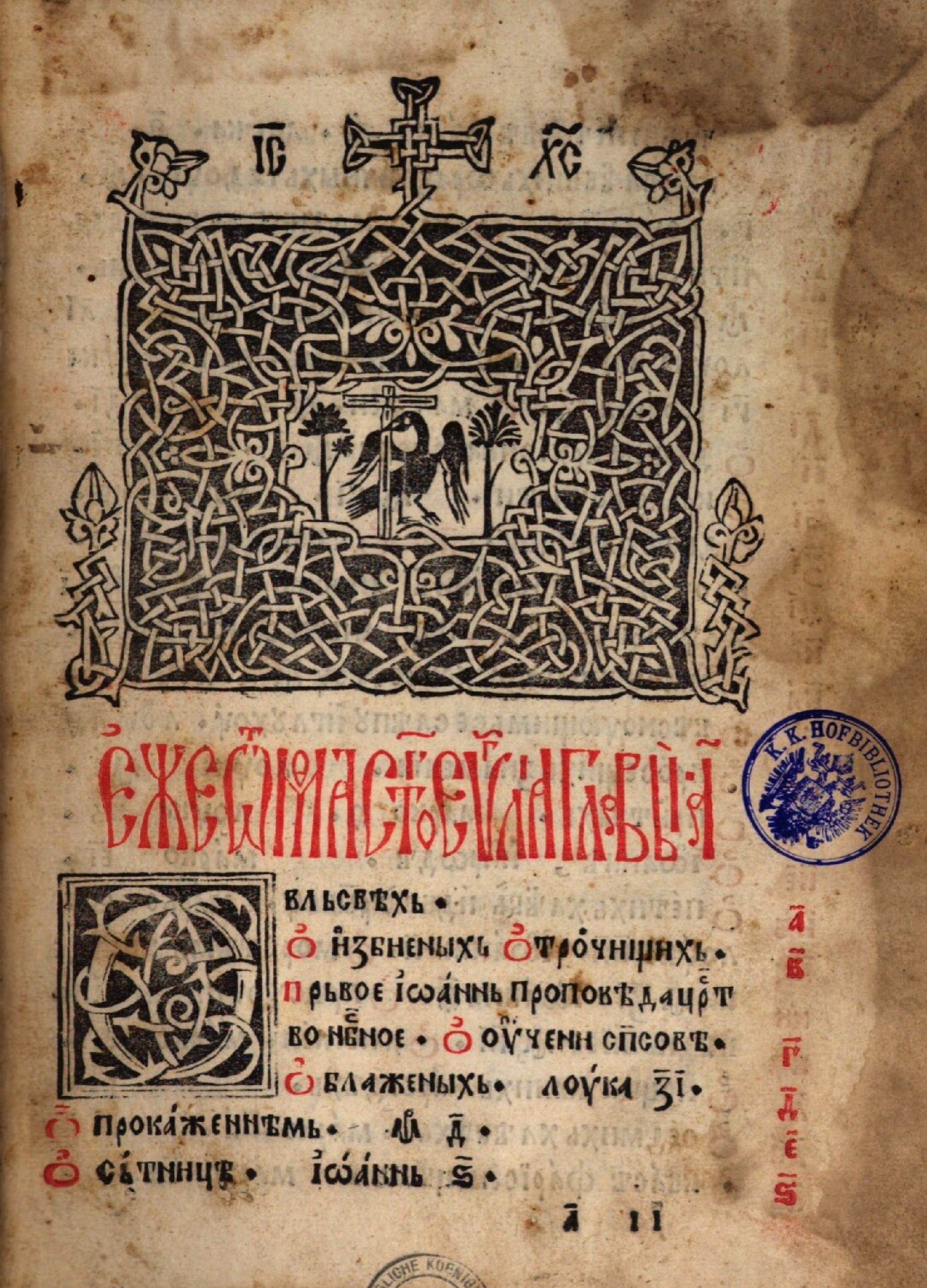
- A page from the Four Gospels printed at the Mrkšina crkva printing house in 1562
- Status: defunct (1566)
- Predecessor: Belgrade printing house
- Founded: 1562
- Founder: Hieromonk Mardarije
- Country of origin: Serbia
- Headquarters location: Kosjerić
- Publication types: srbulje
- Owner: monastery of Mrkšina crkva

The Mrkšina crkva printing house (printing house in the monastery of Mrkšina crkva; Serbian: штампарија Мркшина црква, штампарија у манастиру Мркшина црква, Мркшиначка штампарија / štamparija Mrkšina crkva, štamparija u manastiru Mrkšina crkva, Mrkšinačka štamparija) was a printing house established in 1562 in the monastery of Mrkšina crkva in village Kosjerić in Ottoman Serbia (today a town in Serbia). This printing house was operational until 1566 and printed two srbulje books, The Four Gospels (Четворојеванђеље / Četvorojevanđelje) in 1562 and The Flower Triod (Триод Цветни / Triod Cvetni) in 1566. In 1567 the Ottomans destroyed the church and its printing house.

== Location ==
Today the exact location of this printing house is unknown. There are different theories about exact location of the monastery and its printing house, but all of them agree that it was somewhere near Kosjerić. One of the most possible locations is above the county house and mouth of the river Kladoroba and Skrapež.

== Printing ==
The books created in the printing house were edited and printed by Hieromonk Mardarije. According to some sources, it was Mardarije who inspired first Dmitrović and then Trojan Gundulić to invest in a printing business and organized all activities during the set up of the printing house in Belgrade. Some sources explain that Mardarije moved a printing press from Belgrade to monastery of Mrkšina crkva. Two books were printed in the Mrkšina crkva printing house:

- The Four Gospels (Четворојеванђеље / Četvorojevanđelje) in 1562 and
- The Flower Triod (Триод Цветни / Triod Cvetni) in 1566.

The Flower Triod is recognizable because in this book Mardarije preferred to use figural motifs instead of the ornaments. This book was printed on 1 September 1566 by Hieromonk Mardarije, priest Živko and deacon Radul. This was the last book printed in the Mrkšina crkva printing house in 1566.

== Aftermath ==
In 1567 the Ottomans burned the church and its printing house, while the monks fled to Rača Monastery, similar to monks from Rujno Monastery printing house who fled there after 1537. After the printing house became defunct in 1566, no other such operation existed in Ottoman Serbia until 1831.

== Legacy ==
Two copies of the Four Gospels printed at Mrkšina crkva are still preserved in the monastery of the Holy Trinity of Pljevlja, one copy in Ždrebaonik Monastery and two in Cetinje Monastery. A street in Kosjerić heading to the supposed place of the Mrkšina crkva is named Zoupan Mrkša.

== See also ==
- Goražde printing house
- Vuković printing house
- Crnojević printing house
- Belgrade printing house
- Mileševa printing house
- Rujno Monastery printing house
- Swietopelk Printery

== Sources ==
- Ćirković, Sima (2004). The Serbs. Malden: Blackwell Publishing.
