= Vuk Vrčević =

- Vuk Vrčević
- Born: 26 February 1811; Risan, Habsburg monarchy (today Montenegro)
- Died: 13 August 1882 (aged 71); Dubrovnik, Austria-Hungary (today Croatia)
- Occupation: linguist

Vuk Vrčević (Serbian Cyrillic: Вук Врчевић; Risan, 26 February 1811 – Dubrovnik, 13 August 1882) was a collector of lyric poetry and companion of Vuk Karadžić, the famed linguist and reformer of the Serbian language. He also translated into Serbian the poetical work of Pietro Antonio Domenico Trapessi, better known by his pseudonym Metastasio (1698–1782).

== Biography ==
On 26 February, 1811, Vuk Vrčević was born in Risan of the Bay of Kotor, then under the rule of the Habsburg monarchy. His family was of Serbian origin and settled in Boka Kotorska from time immemorial. His parents lived in poverty. Vrčević learnt languages early, becoming familiar with Old Slavonic, Russian, Greek, Turkish, Latin, Italian, French, and German. When he was 20 years old, Vrčević's father, a well-respected clerk and schoolteacher who was battling tuberculosis, died suddenly in 1831, leaving Vrčević's mother and 13 siblings in his care. That same year, they had all moved to Budva, where Vrčević's first job was in a merchant's office as an agent of a trading company. In 1835, Vuk Stefanović Karadžić was living in nearby Kotor at the time. It was there that Vrčević first made an acquaintance with Karadžić who had already started to reform and standardize the Serbian language and became his lifelong collaborator in collecting national folk songs and tales. Together with Priest Vuk Popović, he collected srbulje in Herzegovina and Montenegro. The Three Vuks (Karadžić, Popović and Vrčević), with support of Russian scholars, collected almost all remaining srbulje from Montenegro.

He died at Dubrovnik on 13 August, 1882.

== Sources ==
- Jovan Skerlić, Istorije nove srpske kniževnosti (Belgrade, 1921), pages 239–275
- Hrvatska Lipa Magazine, Vol. I, No. 28, 1875, pages 228 and 233.
- Милићевић, Милан Ђ. (1888). Поменик знаменитих људи у српског народа новијега доба.
- Гавриловић, Андра (2008). Знаменити Срби XIX вијека. Београд: Научна КМД.
