= Hieromonk Mardarije =

Serbian hieromonk and printer (16th century)

- Died: after 1566
- Occupations: monk, printer and editor
- Known for: being one of the first printer of srbulje (books in the Serbian recension of Church Slavonic)

Hieromonk Mardarije (Serbian Cyrillic: Јеромонах Мардарије; fl. 1552–66) was a Serbian Orthodox hieromonk and one of the most important early Serb printers. Mardarije was the first Belgrade printer and last great printer of srbulje books. Mardarije first printed books at the Belgrade printing house in 1552. When its owner gave up the printing business, he moved the printing press to Mrkšina crkva monastery in Kosjerić where he established the Mrkšina crkva printing house.

== Belgrade printing house ==
Mardarije worked as an editor and printer at the Belgrade printing house owned first by Count Radiša Dmitrović and later by Trojan Gundulić. According to some sources, it was Hieromonk Mardarije who inspired first Dmitrović and then Gundulić to invest in the printing business and organized all activities during the set-up of the printing house in Belgrade. In 1552 he printed a Gospel Book (Четворојеванђеље). Mardarije is the author of the afterword published at the end of the Gospel Book in which he succinctly described how the book came into being, the establishment of the Belgrade printing house and its key people. Mardarije edited this book under great influence of the books published in the Crnojević printing house.

== Mrkšina crkva printing house ==
When Gundulić gave up printing books, Mardarije moved the printing press from Belgrade to the Mrkšina crkva monastery in Kosjerić and established the Mrkšina crkva printing house in it. Two books were printed in the Mrkšina crkva printing house: a Gospel Book, printed in 1562 and a Flowery Triodon (Триод Цветни) in 1566. The Flowery Triodon is recognizable because in this book Mardarije preferred to use figural motives instead of the ornaments.

== Misidentification with Hegumen Mardarije ==
In many earlier sources Hieromonk Mardarije is misidentified with Hegumen Mardarije who was also a printer, but in the Mileševa printing house. Taking in consideration that Mardarije of the Mrkšina crkva printing house never referred to himself in his books as a hegumen (a much higher position), it was concluded that Hieromonk Mardarije and Hegumen Mardarije were two different persons.

== Sources ==
- Ćirković, Sima (2004). The Serbs. Malden: Blackwell Publishing.
