= Šumadija–Vojvodina dialect =

Dialect of Shtokavian supradialect of Serbo-Croatian language

Šumadija–Vojvodina
- шумадијско-војвођански šumadijsko-vojvođanski
- Language family: Indo-European: Balto-Slavic; Slavic; South Slavic; Western; Shtokavian; Neo-Shtokavian; Šumadija–Vojvodina

Language codes
- ISO 639-3: –
- Glottolog: suma1275
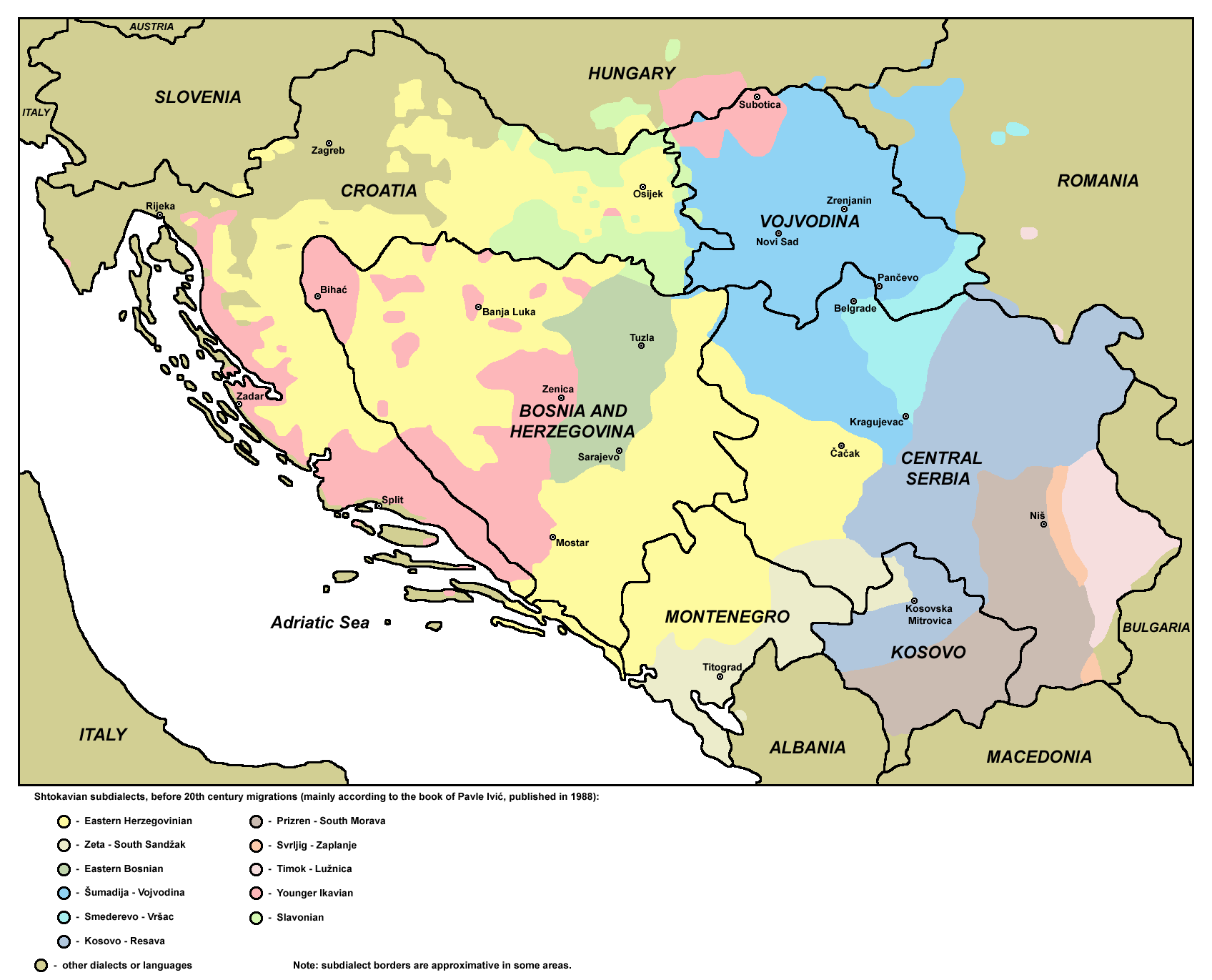
- Map of Shtokavian subdialects prior to the 20th-century migrations; Vojvodina–Šumadija subdialect area shown in blue

Šumadija–Vojvodina dialect (Serbo-Croatian: шумадијско-војвођански дијалект / šumadijsko-vojvođanski dijalekt) is a dialect of Shtokavian supradialect of Serbo-Croatian language, dominantly of Ekavian pronunciation. It is a base for Ekavian Standard Serbian.

== Geographical distribution ==
The dialect is mainly spoken in Serbia or more exactly in wider area of Belgrade, Vojvodina, Mačva, Kolubara, and western half of Šumadija. Some of the speakers are also to be found in neighboring area of Croatia, around Vukovar.

== History ==
In the 16th century, the dialect was spoken in entire Vojvodina, as well as in some parts of present-day Hungary and Romania. During the Great Serb Migration, many speakers of the dialect were settled in the Budapest region. Most of these settlers were later assimilated. During the 18th and 19th century, the territorial distribution of the dialect was reduced due to the migrations of speakers of Hungarian language from the north and speakers of Romanian language from the east. It was also a base for the Serbian literary language in the 18th and 19th century, before the linguistic reform was introduced by Vuk Karadžić. During the reform, the standard variety of the dialect was adapted to be more similar to Ijekavian dialect.
