= Headpiece (book illustration) =

Ornament placed above the text of a page

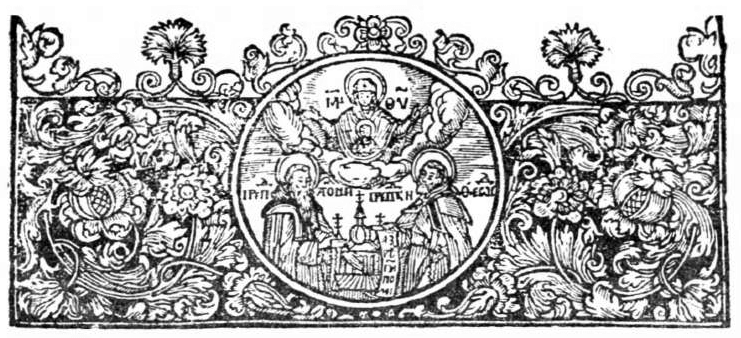
Headpiece from "Triodion", a religious manuscript from 1642

Headpiece (also spelled head-piece), is a decoration printed in the blank space at the beginning of a chapter or other division of a book, usually an ornamental panel, printer's ornament or a small illustration done by a professional illustrator.

The use of decorative headpieces in manuscripts was inherited by the medieval West from late Antique and Byzantine book production, and enjoyed particular popularity during the Renaissance.

Headpieces, sometimes incorporating a rubric or heading, as well as Zoomorphic and anthropomorphic motifs were used widely in manuscripts and in editions of the Bible in the 15th century.

Similarly, a tailpiece is located at the end of a chapter or section.

== See also ==
- Media related to Headpieces (book illustration) at Wikimedia Commons
- Media related to Tailpieces (book illustration) at Wikimedia Commons
- Page header
- Illustrated manuscripts
- Initial
- Miniature
