= Srbulja =

Medieval Serbian liturgical book

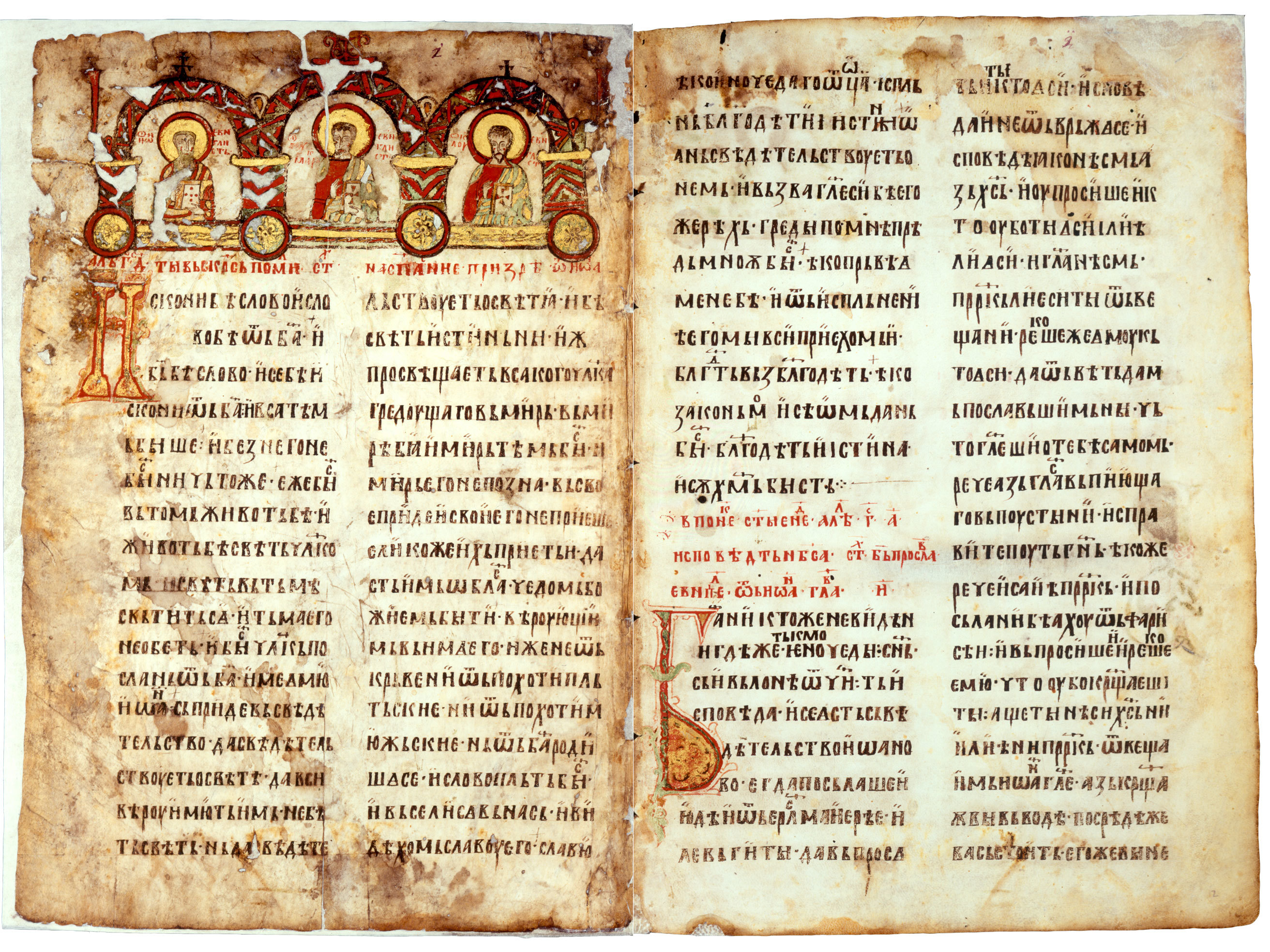
The Miroslav's Gospel, Serbian medieval manuscript from the 12th century

A srbulјa (Serbian Cyrillic: србуља; in plural: srbulje) is a liturgical book written or printed in the Serbian recension of Church Slavonic, which was the literary and liturgical language of Serbs from the 12th century to the 18th century. The term was used for the first time by Vuk Karadžić in 1816 to differentiate liturgical books written in the Serbian recension from those written in the Russian recension, which gradually replaced srbulje during the 19th century.

Until the end of the 15th century, srbulje were only written books. Since 1494 (Cetinje Octoechos) until the middle of the 17th century, several printing houses printed srbulje.

== Etymology ==
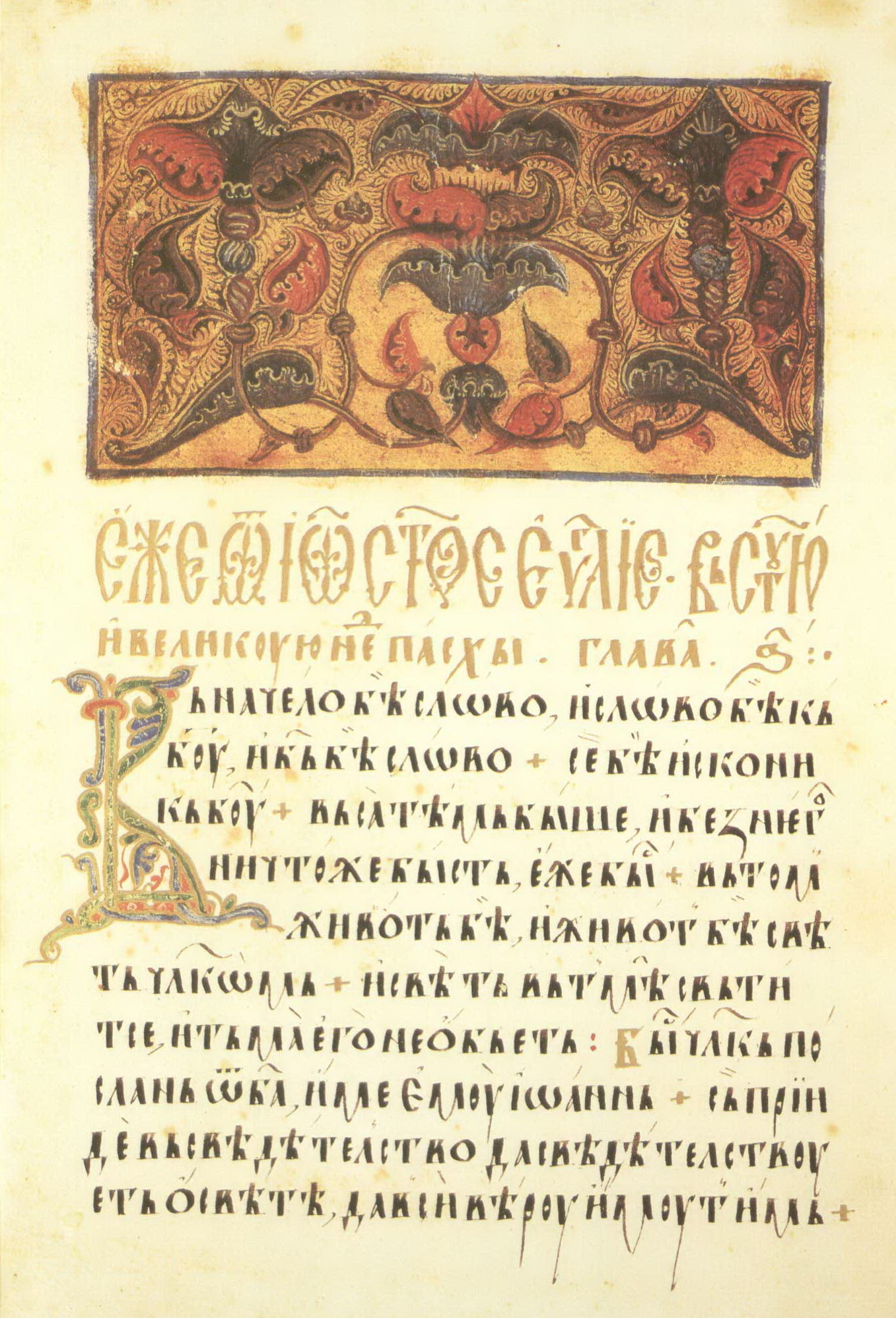
The Radoslav's Gospel, Serbian medieval manuscript from the 15th century

The oldest mention of the term is in a letter to Jernej Kopitar by Vuk Karadžić on 1 August 1816. One of the reasons for designating a particular name for old printed or written Serbian language books was to differentiate them from the Russian language liturgical books.

== History ==
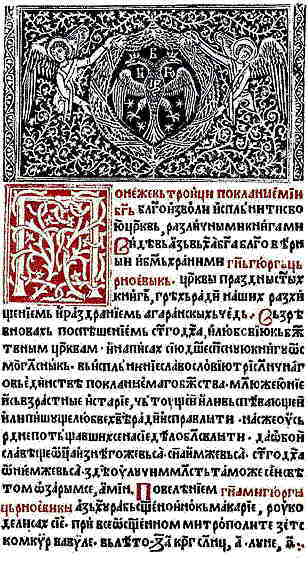
The Cetinje Octoechos, Serbian incunabula from 1494

Srbulje were published in printed form between the 15th and 17th centuries. The history of printing of early Serbian language books is connected with historical situation on the territory populated by Serbs. When printing press was invented significant part of this territory was captured by Ottoman Empire which subjected Christian population to process of islamization. The printing of Serbian language books had a mission to resist to the islamization of the Serbs and to preserve their identity as internal enemies of the Ottoman Empire. Faced with danger from the Ottoman Empire, Venice and Vatican tolerated to certain extent activities of Serbian diaspora and printing of srbulje.

The first book printed on Serbian language is Cetinje Octoechos (Serbian: Октоих) which is of exceptional importance as the first book printed on Serbian language. It was printed by Hieromonk Makarije in the Crnojević printing house, established Đurađ Crnojević in Zeta.

During 16th century srbulje were printed in many other printing shops, including Serbian Venetian Printing House, Goražde printing house, Rujno Monastery printing house and many other. Most of printing houses were established in churches and monasteries, which was by some scholars perceived as evidence that Serbian Orthodox Church still received significant income, although Serbia was under Ottoman Empire. The Ottomans were opposed to the printing of the books generally, and especially to Christian liturgical books. According to some authors, printing houses were deliberately established in remote churches and monasteries like in case of Mrkšina crkva printing house, Rujno Monastery printing house and Goražde printing house, to hide their activities from the Ottomans.

Jerolim Zagurović and Vićenco Vuković were the last printers of printed srbulje. There was only one book printed in 1638 in Venice by Bartholomew Ginami, but that was only a reprint of psalter with book of hours published by Zagurović in 1569.

== Replacement by Russian books ==
The influence of Russian language liturgical books was intensified since 1726, when Russian graduate teachers from Kyiv Mohyla Academy arrived at Sremski Karlovci's newly established Slavonic-Latin-Greek schools. Based on the monastic rules of Metropolitan Vikentije Jovanović of Karlovci, liturgical books had to be written in Russian recension of Church Slavic. During the 18th century srbulje became scarce, and churches had to import and use Russian language liturgical books, thus furthering the departure from old Serbian literary traditions.

== Early 19th century collecting ==
At the beginning of the 19th century collectionaries from various countries, including Vuk Karadžić, collected srbulje. In Montenegro and Herzegovina this task was performed by Vuk Popović (priest from Kotor) and Vuk Vrčević, on behalf of Vuk Karadžić. Vuk Popović received from Vuk Karadžić new liturgical books printed on Serbian language and exchanged them for srbulje. Three Vuks (Karadžić, Popović and Vrčević) with support of Russian scholars collected almost all remaining srbulje from Montenegro. Besides from Montenegro, Vuk Karadžić also received srbulje from Dalmatia, Zadar, Osijek, Sombor, etc... Every time he travelled to Serbia Karadžić would use the opportunity to visit monasteries and prepare lists of their old liturgical books. This activities were not always welcomed by the people in service of knjaz Miloš Obrenović in Kragujevac.

== See also ==
- Serbian manuscripts
- Medieval Serbian literature

== Sources ==
- Albijanić, Aleksandar (1985). "The Demise of Serbian Church Slavic and the advent of the Slaveno-Serbski Literary Dialect". The Formation of the Slavonic literary Languages. Columbus, Ohio: Slavica Publishers. pp. 115–123.
- Ćirković, Sima (2004). The Serbs. Malden: Blackwell Publishing.
- Grickat-Radulović, Irena (1993). "Serbian Medieval Literary Language". Serbs in European Civilization. Belgrade: Nova, Serbian Academy of Sciences and Arts, Institute for Balkan Studies. pp. 146–150.
- Ivić, Pavle (2024). The Serbian people and their language (PDF). Novi Sad: Matica Srpska.
- Kašić, Dušan, ed. (1965). Serbian Orthodox Church: Its past and present. Vol. 1. Belgrade: Serbian Orthodox Church.
- Pavlović, Jovan, ed. (1992). Serbian Orthodox Church: Its past and present. Vol. 8. Belgrade: Serbian Orthodox Church.
- Paxton, Roger V. (1981). "Identity and Consciousness: Culture and Politics among the Habsburg Serbs in the Eighteenth Century". Nation and Ideology: Essays in Honor of Wayne S. Vucinich. Boulder, Colorado: East European Monographs. pp. 101–120.
- Zbornik (1964). Zbornik Matice srpske za književnost i jezik. Matica srpska.
- Bibliotekar (1986). Bibliotekar. Savez bibliotečkih radnika Srbije.
- Svjetlost (1988). Život. Svjetlost.
- Vijesnik (1989). Vjesnik bibliotekara Hrvatske. Mazuranicev.
- Letopis (1995). Летопис Матице српске. У Српској народној задружној штампарији.
- Samardžić, Radovan (1993). Istorija srpskog naroda: pt. 1-2. Srbi pod tudinskom vlashdu 1537-1699. Srpska knjiiževna zadruga.
- Ivić, Pavle (1996). "Srpsko štamparstvo". Istorija srpske kulture (in Serbian). Dečje novine. ISBN 9788636707920.
- Maksimović, Vojislav (1997). Vuk i sljedbenici. Srpsko prosvjetno i kulturno društvo "Prosvjeta".
- Milosavljević, Petar (2003). Uvod u srbistiku. Trebnik. ISBN 9788672160338.
- Jakić (1866). Priměri starohèrvatskoga jezika iz glagolskih i cirilskih knjževnih starinah: sastavljeni za sedmi i osmi gomnazijalni razred. Uvod i priměri starohrvatski. Jakić.
