= Pavle Ivić =

Serbian South Slavic dialectologist and phonologist

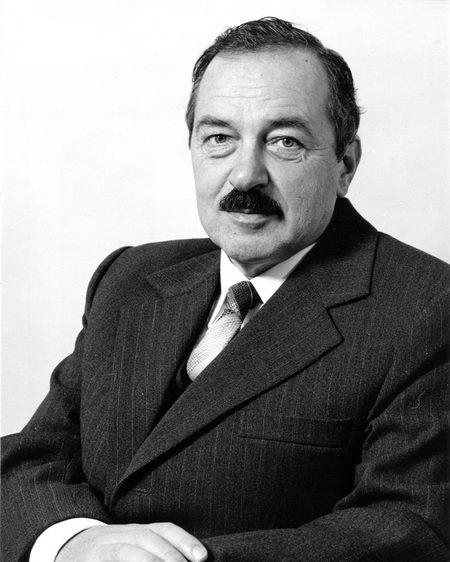
- Born: December 1, 1924; Belgrade, Kingdom of Serbs, Croats and Slovenes
- Died: September 19, 1999 (aged 74); Belgrade, Federal Republic of Yugoslavia

Academic work
- Main interests: Linguistics, dialectology

Pavle Ivić (Serbian Cyrillic: Павле Ивић, pronounced [pâːʋle ǐːʋitɕ]; 1 December 1924 – 19 September 1999) was a Serbian dialectologist and phonologist of the South Slavic languages.

== Biography ==
Both his field work and his synthesizing studies were extensive and authoritative. A few of his best-known publications are:

- Die serbokroatischen Dialekte, ihre Struktur und Entwicklung, Gravenhage, Mouton, 1958.
- Srpski narod i njegov jezik. Belgrade: Srpska književna zadruga, 1971.
  - English edition: Ivić, Pavle (2024). The Serbian people and their language (PDF). Novi Sad: Matica Srpska. Archived from the original on 2025-12-29.
- Word and sentence prosody in Serbocroatian, by Ilse Lehiste and Pavle Ivić. Cambridge, Mass.: MIT Press, 1986.

He edited many periodicals and scholarly series, and was an important figure in the Slavic Linguistic Atlas project. He was an authority on the standardization of the Serbian language. He frequently lectured in the United States and other countries, and was an Honorary Member of the Linguistic Society of America.

A member of the Serbian Academy of Sciences and Arts, he took part in the polemics accompanying the breakdown of SFR Yugoslavia. He was as signatory of the 1986 Memorandum of the Serbian Academy of Sciences and Arts.

He was married to Milka Ivić (1923–2011), a Slavic syntactician and professor.
