= Crnojević printing house =

First Serbian printing house in Southern Europe

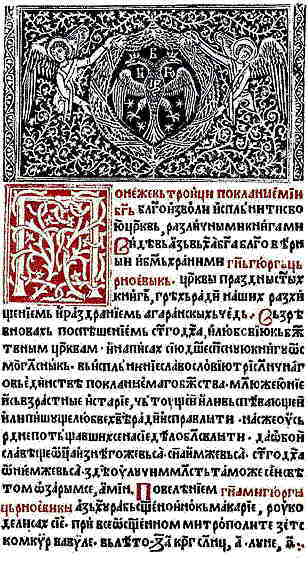
- A page of Oktoih (1494)
- Status: defunct (1496)
- Founder: Đurađ Crnojević
- Defunct: 1496 (Julian)
- Country of origin: Zeta
- Headquarters location: Cetinje
- Key people: hieromonk Makarije
- Publication types: srbulje
- Fiction genres: Slavonic typography

The Crnojević printing house (Serbian: Штампарија Црнојевића, romanized: Štamparija Crnojevića) or Cetinje printing house (Serbian: Цетињска штампарија, romanized: Cetinjska štamparija), was the first Serbian printing house in Southeastern Europe; the facility operated between 1493 and 1496 in Cetinje, Zeta (modern Montenegro).

It was founded by Đurađ Crnojević, the ruler of Zeta between 1490 and 1496. The printing press was operated by Serbian Orthodox monks at the supervision of Hieromonk Makarije. Five Orthodox liturgical books were printed in this printshop: Oktoih Prvoglasnik, Oktoih Petoglasnik, Psaltir, Trebnik (Molitvenik) and Cvetni Triod.

- Octoechos of the First Tone (Oktoih prvoglasnik) is the first book printed in the Serbian Cyrillic among Serbs. It was finished on 4 January 1494. There are 108 copies of this book existing. It contains 270 leaves sized 29 x 21,6 cm. It is characterized by high quality and clean two-coloured printing, red and black, with nicely shaped letters. It is decorated with headpieces and initials printed from woodcuts in the spirit of the Renaissance with traces of old manuscript traditions.
- Octoechos of the Fifth Tone (Oktoih petoglasnik) represents the first illustrated Serbian incunabulum. It is preserved in fragments, the longest one containing 37 leaves. It has six woodcut illustrations, made by an artist who managed to put rather complex compositions with many characters on a relatively small space.
- Psalter with Additions (Psaltir s posledovanjem) was printed in 1495. It is not only of liturgical and conventional but also historical and literary significance. It is decorated with three headpieces and 27 initials repeated for 221 time. There are 36 complete and partial copies preserved. The National Library of Montenegro "Đurđe Crnojević" published 650 facsimiles of the psalter in 1986.

== Legacy ==
In his 1514 letter to Ragusan senate, Ragusan nobleman Luka Primojević emphasized that he had intention to print books using the same letters used by Serbian priests in their churches, the same letters used in the Crnojević printing house which books were well respected and praised. Although his intention to establish a printing house in Dubrovnik and to print Cyrillic books failed, his written statements left significant testimony about high reputation of books printed in the Crnojević printing house.

== Sources ==
- Ćirković, Sima (2004). The Serbs. Malden: Blackwell Publishing. ISBN 9781405142915.
