= Serbian language =

Standard variety of Serbo-Croatian

Serbian
- српски / srpski
- Pronunciation: [sr̩̂pskiː]
- Native to: Serbia; Bosnia-Herzegovina; Montenegro; Kosovo; Croatia; Hungary; Romania
- Region: Southeastern Europe
- Ethnicity: Serbs
- Native speakers: 8.2 million (2022–23)
- Language family: Indo-European: Balto-Slavic; Slavic; South Slavic; Western South Slavic; Serbo-Croatian; Serbian
- Writing system: Cyrillic (Serbian Cyrillic); Latin (Gaj's Latin); Braille (Yugoslav Braille)

Official status
- Official language in: Serbia; Bosnia-Herzegovina (Note: Although Bosnia and Herzegovina does not have an official language at the state level, Serbian has been designated as an official language in its entities: the Federation of Bosnia and Herzegovina and Republika Srpska.); Montenegro (Note: Serbian was the official language of Montenegro until 2007 and the adoption of the new Constitution of Montenegro, when Montenegrin was made the sole official language of the country, while Serbian was granted the status of a "language in official use".); Kosovo (Note: Serbian is a co-official language of Kosovo along with Albanian.)
- Recognised minority language in: Croatia; North Macedonia; Romania; Hungary; Czech Republic; Slovakia
- Regulated by: Board for Standardization of the Serbian Language

Language codes
- ISO 639-1: sr
- ISO 639-2: srp
- ISO 639-3: srp
- Glottolog: serb1264
- Linguasphere: part of 53-AAA-g
- Countries where Serbian is an official language. Countries where Serbian is a recognized minority language.

- Serbian is not endangered according to the classification system of the UNESCO Atlas of the World's Languages in Danger

Serbian (Note: српски / srpski [sr̩̂pskiː]) is the standard variety of the Serbo-Croatian language mainly used by Serbs. It is the national official language and literary standard of Serbia, one of the official languages in Bosnia-Herzegovina and Kosovo, and a recognized minority language in numerous countries.

Serbian is based on the most widespread supradialect of Serbo-Croatian, Shtokavian (more specifically on the dialects of Šumadija-Vojvodina and Eastern Herzegovina), which is also the basis of other Serbo-Croatian standard varieties: Croatian, Bosnian, and Montenegrin.

Serbian is a rare example of synchronic digraphia, using both Cyrillic and Latin scripts.

== History ==
The history of the Serbian language traces its origins through successive stages of differentiation within the South Slavic subgroup of Slavic languages. This process intensified after the Slavic migrations of the 6th and 7th centuries, leading to the emergence of Serbian alongside other South Slavic languages. As the ancestor of all Slavic languages, the Proto-Slavic language emerged between approximately 1500 and 1000 BC in the southern portion of the Proto-Balto-Slavic linguistic area. Linguistic evidence, such as the consistent preservation of vocabulary related to local hydrology, flora, and fauna across modern Slavic languages, supports this location, roughly corresponding to areas of eastern Poland, southern Belarus, and northwestern Ukraine during classical antiquity (encompassing the Vistula, Bug, Dnieper, and Pripyat river basins). The language reached its peak in the 5th and 6th centuries, expanding rapidly westward, southward, eastward, and northward during Slavic migrations.

Dialectal differentiation began during this period, though mutual intelligibility persisted; by the 8th century, a largely uniform Proto-Slavic was spoken from Thessaloniki in the south to Veliky Novgorod in the north. The final pan-dialectal changes occurred in the 9th century, after which individual Slavic languages gradually emerged. A degree of general Slavic mutual intelligibility continued for several centuries, as evidenced by the missionary work of Cyril and Methodius, who used a South Slavic dialect from the Thessaloniki region to evangelize Slavs in Great Moravia. The loss of weak jers (reduced vowels ъ and ь), occurring regionally between the 10th and 12th centuries, marks the conventional end of Proto-Slavic, coinciding with the appearance of written records showing significant divergences and the development of distinct recensions.

The language used in works of Cyril and Methodius, and their later followers, became known as the Old Church Slavonic (also Old Slavonic, or Old Slavic). As the earliest attested Slavic literary language, it was codified in the 9th century based on the South Slavic dialects spoken around Thessaloniki, using the Glagolitic and later Cyrillic scripts for translating biblical and liturgical texts. During the Middle Ages, it served as the primary literary and liturgical language for most Slavic peoples, influencing the development of subsequent vernacular literary traditions.

=== Middle Ages ===
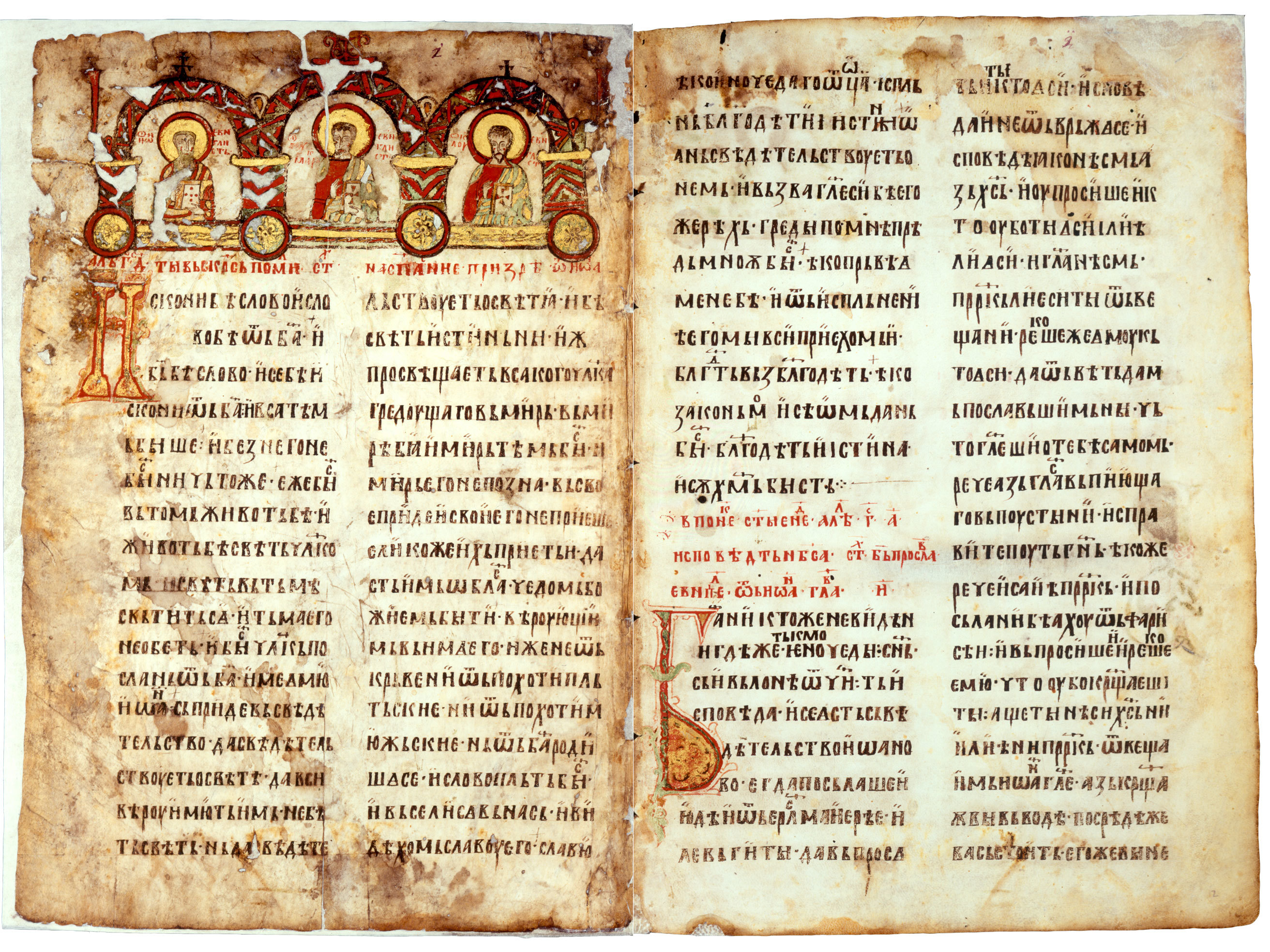
Miroslav Gospel, 1186, one of the oldest manuscripts written in the Serbian recension of Church Slavic

During the medieval and early modern periods, the use of Old Slavic literary language among Serbs was marked by various influences from the Serbian old vernacular language, thus creating a distinctive Serbian redaction of the Old Slavic. That redaction or recension is referred to as the old Serbian Church-Slavic literary language (also Serbian-Slavonic / Serbo-Slavonic, or Serbian-Slavic / Serbo-Slavic), and in that language works of the Medieval Serbian literature were created. In the same time, Old Serbian vernacular language was used in private letters and various documents, particularly during the late medieval and later (early modern) periods. Serbian redaction of Church Slavonic played a key role in medieval Serbian written culture before the later rise of vernacular-based standards. The oldest surviving manuscripts in this recension originate from regions such as Zeta and Zachlumia (Hum), though linguistic features suggest its development may have occurred farther east, nearer the early centres of Slavic literacy, Ohrid and Preslav. The area around the present-day border of Serbia and North Macedonia, north of the Kratovo-Skopje-Tetovo line, is considered to be the area of its origin. The oldest preserved written monuments, from the end of the 12th century, testify to the fact that the process of forming the Serbian Slavonic was already complete. It had three established orthographies:

- Zeta-Hum, which was the oldest and used in Serbia until the beginning of the 13th century
- Raška, which succeeded Zeta-Hum in Serbia and was in use until the first decades of the 15th century
- Resava, which originated in the 15th century

At the very end of the Middle Ages and the start of the early Modern Period, in the second half of the 15th century — right after Serbia became a part of the Ottoman Empire — Serbian was used as one of the four imperially important languages in the Arabic-Persian-Greek-Serbian Conversation Textbook, a phrasal dictionary in two volumes: first volume with Serbian Shtokavian-Ijekavian and second volume with Serbian Shtokavian-Ekavian, one just under and the other just over 100 pages long.

=== Early modern period ===
During the 16th and 17th centuries, Serbian Church Slavic language continued to be used as the liturgical and literary language within the Serbian Patriarchate of Peć, and those traditions continued up to the beginning of the 18th century. In works of the early modern Serbian printing, from the end of the 15th century to the middle of the 17th century, liturgical contents were printed in Serbian Church Slavic, while colophons with introductions were composed under the influence of Serbian vernacular language, that was commonly used both in official and private epistolography.

During the 18th century, among Eastern Orthodox Serbs in the Habsburg Monarchy, various influences from the earlier Russian ecclesiastical and literary reforms (known as the Nikon's reforms) were accepted within the Serbian Orthodox Metropolitanate of Karlovci, thus leading to several major changes: Serbian redaction of the Church Slavic was gradually replaced in liturgical use by the official (synodical, or neo-Moscowian) Russian Church Slavonic redaction, and those changes also influenced the Serbian literary language, making it more distinctive from the common Serbian vernacular language. The use of Russian-Slavonic language among Serbs consequently led to the creation of a specific Slavonic-Serbian language (also known as Slavo-Serbian, a hybrid language that was used during the second half of the 18th century and the first half of the 19th century by Serbian educated elites.

=== Modern period ===
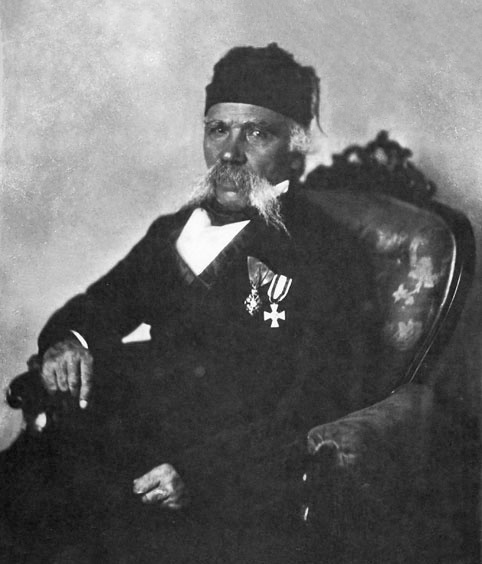
Vuk Karadžić, reformer of the Serbian language

In the early 19th century, Vuk Karadžić reformed the Serbian literary language by basing it on the vernacular folk speech, adopting the principle 'Write as you speak.' He also standardized the Serbian Cyrillic alphabet by following strict phonemic principles on the Johann Christoph Adelung's model and Jan Hus's Czech alphabet. Karadžić's reforms of the Serbian literary language modernized it and distanced it from the Slavonic-Serbian and Church Slavonic, bringing it closer to common folk speech. For example, Karadžić discarded earlier letters and signs that had no match in common Serbian speech and introduced six new Cyrillic letters to make writing the Serbian language simpler.

Because the Slavonic-Serbian written language of the early 19th century contained many words connected to the Orthodox church and a large number of loanwords from Church Slavonic, Karadžić proposed to abandon this written language and to create a new one, based on the Eastern Herzegovinian dialect which he spoke. Some Serbian clergy and other linguists opposed him, for example, the high clergy based in the Serbian Orthodox Church seat in Sremski Karlovci (near Novi Sad), who viewed the grammar and vocabulary of the Eastern Herzegovinian dialect as almost a foreign tongue, unacceptable as a basis for a modern language. But Karadžić successfully insisted that his linguistic standard was closer to popular speech and could be understood and written by more people. He called his dialect Herzegovinian because, as he wrote, "Serbian is spoken most purely and correctly in Herzegovina and in Bosnia." Karadžić never visited those lands, but his family roots and speech came from Herzegovina. Ultimately, Vuk Karadžić's ideas and linguistic standard won against his clerical and scientific opponents. Karadžić was, together with Đuro Daničić, the main Serbian signatory to the Vienna Literary Agreement of 1850, which, encouraged by Austrian authorities, laid the foundation for the Serbo-Croatian language; Karadžić himself only ever referred to the language as "Serbian".

The Vukovian effort of language standardization lasted the remainder of the century. Before then the Serbs had achieved an independent state (1878), and a flourishing national culture based in Belgrade and Novi Sad. Despite the Vienna Literary Agreement, the Serbs had by this time developed an Ekavian pronunciation, which was the native speech of their two cultural capitals as well as the great majority of the Serb population. Vuk Karadžić greatly influenced South Slavic linguists across Southeast Europe: in Croatia, the linguist Tomislav Maretić acknowledged Karadžić's work as foundational to his codification of Croatian grammar.

== Geographic distribution ==
| Country/territory | Speakers | Share |
|---|---|---|
| Serbia | 5,607,558 | 84.3% |
| Bosnia and Herzegovina | 1,086,027 | 30.8% |
| Montenegro | 269,307 | 43.2% |
| Kosovo | 95,000 | 5.7% |
| Croatia | 45,004 | 1.1% |
| North Macedonia | 11,252 | 0.6% |
| Romania | 10,058 | 0.05% |
| Hungary | 4,249 | 0.04% |
| Czech Republic | 2,914 | 0.02% |
| Slovakia | 1,229 | 0.02% |

The Serbian language holds status of official or recognized minority language in ten countries, where over 7 million people have declared it as their mother tongue. It serves as the official language of Serbia, where it is the native tongue of 84% of the population. Serbian is a co-official language in Bosnia-Herzegovina and Kosovo, where it is spoken almost exclusively by the ethnic Serb population, representing roughly one-third and 5% of the total population in each entity, respectively. In Montenegro, Serbian remains the most widely spoken language, with 43% of the population declaring it as their mother tongue, despite its legal status as a recognized minority language; it is declared mother tongue not only by ethnic Serbs but also by approximately one-quarter of those identifying as Montenegrins. Furthermore, Serbian enjoys recognized minority language status in Croatia, North Macedonia, Romania, Hungary, the Czech Republic, and Slovakia.

The language is also represented among the Serb diaspora in Europe and overseas. Countries with significant numbers of speakers include Germany, Austria, United States, France, Switzerland, Canada, Australia, and Sweden.

== Differences from other Serbo-Croatian standard varieties ==
Serbian is a standard variety of Serbo-Croatian with other standard varieties being Bosnian, Croatian, and Montenegrin. These varieties are based on the same Shtokavian supradialect and are fully mutually intelligible - speakers can understand each other without difficulty, with intelligibility often exceeding that of variants in other pluricentric languages like English, German, or Spanish. The differences are minor and comparable to regional variants of English (e.g., British vs. American English) rather than separate languages like Spanish and Italian. Grammar, syntax, and core vocabulary are nearly identical.

== Writing system ==
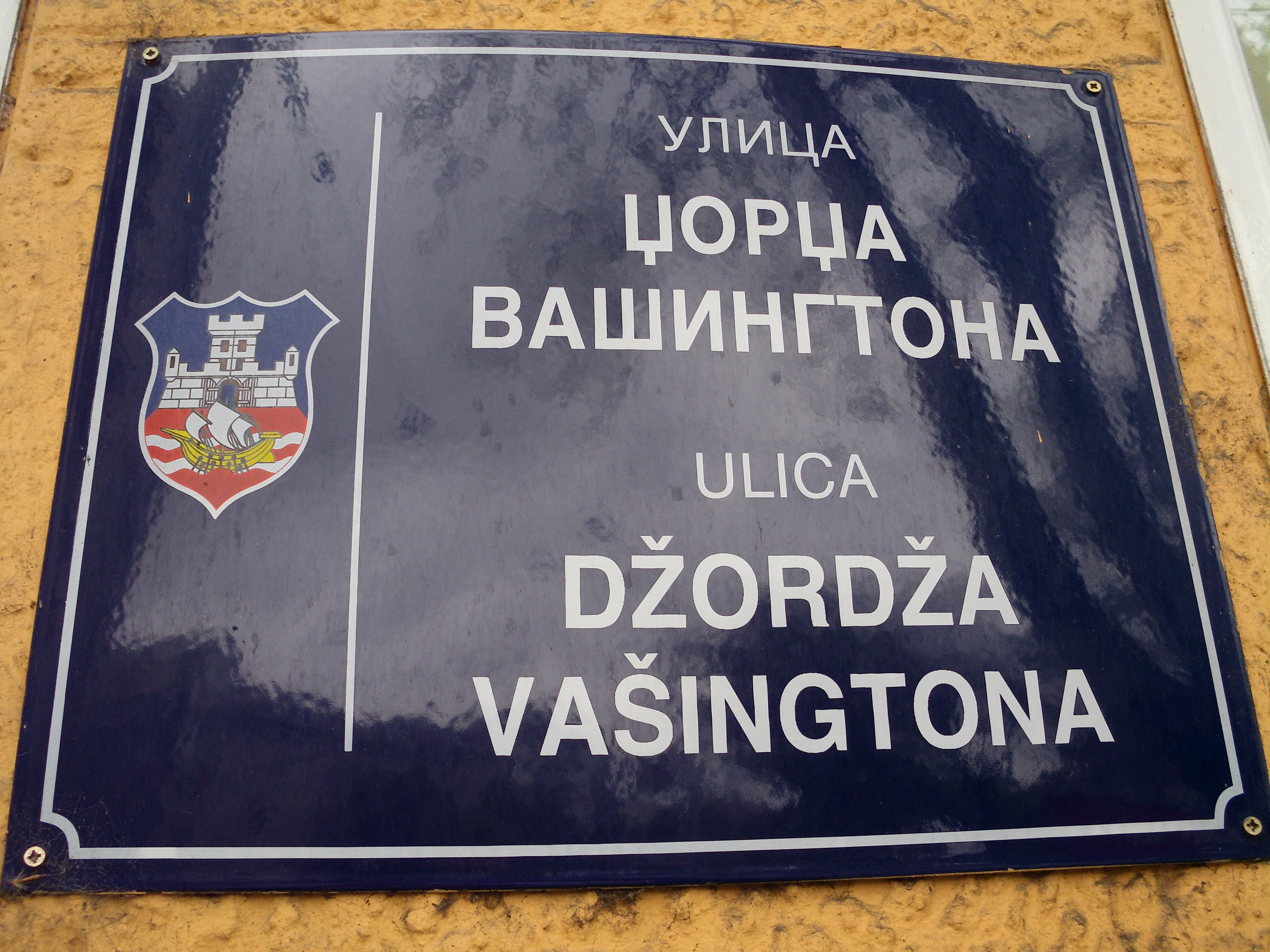
Street sign in Belgrade, using Cyrillic and Latin scripts

Serbian language uses both Cyrillic (ћирилица, ćirilica) and Latin script (латиница, latinica). Serbian is a rare language with active digraphia, a situation where all literate members of a society have two interchangeable writing systems available to them.

Serbian Cyrillic, widely regarded as a key symbol of Serb cultural identity, was devised in 1819 by Serbian linguist Vuk Karadžić, who designed it according to strict phonemic principles (one letter per sound). The Latin alphabet used for Serbian was designed by the Croatian linguist Ljudevit Gaj in the 1830s based on the Czech system with a one-to-one grapheme-phoneme correlation between the Cyrillic and Latin orthographies, resulting in a parallel orthographic system.

In Serbia, the Constitution designates Serbian Cyrillic as the official script, mandating its application in the legal and administrative domains. However, the law does not regulate scripts in standard language, or standard language itself by any means, leaving the choice of script as a matter of personal preference and to the free will in all aspects of life (publishing, media, trade and commerce, etc.), except in the legal and government sphere, where Cyrillic is required. In general, the alphabets are used interchangeably; media and publishers typically select one alphabet or the other. In the public sphere, with logos, outdoor signage and retail packaging, the Latin script predominates, although both scripts are commonly seen. Traffic signs and directional signs, as well as place names on roads are written with both Cyrillic and Latin script. To most Serbs, the Latin script tends to imply a cosmopolitan or neutral attitude, while Cyrillic appeals to a more traditional or vintage sensibility. According to a 2014 poll, 47% of the population uses the Latin alphabet more frequently, 36% primarily uses Cyrillic, while 16% uses both alphabets equally.

Serbian Cyrillic is also script in official use in both Montenegro and Bosnia-Herzegovina, alongside the Latin alphabet.

=== Alphabetic order ===
The sort order of the ćirilica (ћирилица) alphabet:

- Cyrillic order called Azbuka (азбука): А Б В Г Д Ђ Е Ж З И Ј К Л Љ М Н Њ О П Р С Т Ћ У Ф Х Ц Ч Џ Ш

The sort order of the latinica (латиница) alphabet:

- Latin order called Abeceda (абецеда): A B C Č Ć D Dž Đ E F G H I J K L Lj M N Nj O P R S Š T U V Z Ž

== Grammar ==
Serbian is a highly inflected language, with grammatical morphology for nouns, pronouns and adjectives as well as verbs.

=== Nouns ===
Serbian nouns are classified into three declensional types, denoted largely by their nominative case endings as "-a" type, "-i" and "-e" type. Into each of these declensional types may fall nouns of any of three genders: masculine, feminine or neuter. Each noun may be inflected to represent the noun's grammatical case, of which Serbian has seven:

- Nominative
- Genitive
- Dative
- Accusative
- Vocative
- Instrumental
- Locative

Nouns are further inflected to represent the noun's number, singular or plural.

=== Pronouns ===
Pronouns, when used, are inflected along the same case and number morphology as nouns. Serbian is a pro-drop language, meaning that pronouns may be omitted from a sentence when their meaning is easily inferred from the text. In cases where pronouns may be dropped, they may also be used to add emphasis. For example:

| Serbian | English equivalent |
|---|---|
| Kako si? | How are you? |
| A kako si ti? | And how are you? |

=== Adjectives ===
Adjectives in Serbian may be placed before or after the noun they modify, but must agree in number, gender and case with the modified noun.

=== Verbs ===
Serbian verbs are conjugated in four past forms—perfect, aorist, imperfect, and pluperfect—of which the last two have a very limited use (imperfect is still used in some dialects, but the majority of native Serbian speakers consider it archaic), one future tense (also known as the first future tense, as opposed to the second future tense or the future exact, which is considered a tense of the conditional mood by some contemporary linguists), and one present tense. These are the tenses of the indicative mood. Apart from the indicative mood, there is also the imperative mood. The conditional mood has two more tenses: the first conditional (commonly used in conditional clauses, both for possible and impossible conditional clauses) and the second conditional (without use in the spoken language—it should be used for impossible conditional clauses). Serbian has active and passive voice.

As for the non-finite verb forms, Serbian has one infinitive, two adjectival participles (the active and the passive), and two adverbial participles (the present and the past).

== Dialects ==
Serbian is based on Shtokavian, the prestige supradialect of Serbo-Croatian. The primary subdivisions of Shtokavian are based on two principles: one is the way the old Slavic phoneme yat has changed (in the case of Serbian, Ekavian or Ijekavian), second in different accents (whether the subdialect is Old-Shtokavian or Neo-Shtokavian).

- in Ekavian pronunciation (ekavski [ěːkaʋskiː]), yat has conflated into the vowel e. Ekavian is dominant among speakers of Serbian in Serbia, Kosovo, North Macedonia, Romania, and Hungary.
- in Ijekavian pronunciation (ijekavski [ijěːkaʋskiː]), yat has come to be pronounced ije. Ijekavian is dominant among speakers of Serbian in Bosnia-Herzegovina, Montenegro, and Croatia.

The dialects of Shtokavian, regarded traditionally as Serbian, include:

- Šumadija–Vojvodina (Ekavian, Neo-Shtokavian): central and northern Serbia
- Eastern Herzegovinian (Ijekavian/Ekavian, Neo-Shtokavian): southwestern Serbia, western half of Montenegro, Bosnia-Herzegovina, Croatia
- Kosovo–Resava (Ekavian, Old-Shtokavian): eastern-central Serbia, northern Kosovo
- Smederevo–Vršac (Ekavian, Old-Shtokavian): northern-central Serbia
- Prizren–Timok (Ekavian, Old-Shtokavian): southeastern Serbia, eastern Kosovo
- Zeta–Raška (Ijekavian, Old-Shtokavian): eastern half of Montenegro, southwestern Serbia

== Vocabulary ==
Most Serbian words are of native Slavic lexical stock, tracing back to the Proto-Slavic language. The classical languages Latin and Greek are the source of many words, used mostly in international terminology. Many Latin terms entered Serbian during the time when present-day territories populated by Serbs were part of the Roman Empire and also in the later centuries through Romanian and Aromanian. The loanwords of Greek origin in Serbian are a product of the influence of the liturgical language of the Orthodox Church. Many of the numerous loanwords from another Turkic language, Ottoman Turkish and, via Ottoman Turkish, from Arabic were adopted into Serbian during the long period of Ottoman rule.

== Dictionaries ==
Vuk Karadžić's "Serbian Dictionary" (Srpski rječnik), published in 1818, is the earliest dictionary of modern literary Serbian. The "Dictionary of Croatian or Serbian language" (Rječnik hrvatskoga ili srpskoga jezika), published by Yugoslav Academy of Sciences and Arts in twenty-three volumes from 1880 to 1976, is the only general historical dictionary of Serbo-Croatian. There are older, pre-standard dictionaries, such as the German–Serbian dictionary, published in 1791, and the above mentioned 15th century-Arabic-Persian-Greek-Serbian conversation textbook.

Standard dictionaries include:

- "Dictionary of Serbo-Croatian Literary and Vernacular Language" (Rečnik srpskohrvatskog književnog i narodnog jezika), published by the Serbian Academy of Sciences and Arts is the most comprehensive dictionary of Serbian (and Serbo-Croatian as a whole). It remains unfinished, with publication ongoing since 1959. As of 2025, 22 volumes were published, containing around 250,000 entries, while the complete dictionary is expected to comprise 40 volumes with around 500,000 entries, making it one of the most comprehensive in the world, surpassing the "Oxford English Dictionary" (around 300,000 entries), the German "Deutsches Wörterbuch" (around 350,000), and the Dutch "Woordenboek der Nederlandsche Taal" (about 430,000).
- "Dictionary of Serbo-Croatian Literary Language" (Rečnik srpskohrvatskoga književnog jezika), published in six volumes from 1967 to 1976, began as a joint project between Matica srpska (which issued it in Cyrillic script) and Matica hrvatska (which issued it in Latin script), but only the first three volumes were published by Matica hrvatska due to negative feedback from Croatian linguists.
- "Dictionary of the Serbian language" (Rečnik srpskog jezika) in one volume, published in 2007 by Matica srpska, containing more than 85,000 entries.

The only completed etymological dictionary of Serbian is "Etymological Dictionary of Croatian or Serbian language" (Etimologijski rječnik hrvatskoga ili srpskoga jezika), published in four volumes from 1971 to 1974. There is also a new monumental "Etymological Dictionary of Serbian language" (Etimološki rečnik srpskog jezika), which is currently work in progress, with two volumes published.

== Sample text ==
Serbian pronunciation

Article 1 of the Universal Declaration of Human Rights in Serbian, written in the Cyrillic script:

Сва људска бића рађају се слободна и једнака у достојанству и правима. Она су обдарена разумом и свешћу и треба једни према другима да поступају у духу братства.

Article 1 of the Universal Declaration of Human Rights in Serbian, written in the Latin script:

Sva ljudska bića rađaju se slobodna i jednaka u dostojanstvu i pravima. Ona su obdarena razumom i svešću i treba jedni prema drugima da postupaju u duhu bratstva.

Article 1 of the Universal Declaration of Human Rights in English:

All human beings are born free and equal in dignity and rights. They are endowed with reason and conscience and should act towards one another in a spirit of brotherhood.

== See also ==
- Language secessionism in Serbo-Croatian
- Abstand and ausbau languages
- Pluricentric language
- Mutual intelligibility

== Sources and further reading ==
=== Books ===
- Albijanić, Aleksandar (1985). "The Demise of Serbian Church Slavic and the advent of the Slaveno-Serbski Literary Dialect". The Formation of the Slavonic literary Languages. Columbus, Ohio: Slavica Publishers. pp. 115–123. ISBN 978-0-89357-143-6.
- Bubalo, Đorđe (2014). Pragmatic Literacy in Medieval Serbia. Turnhout: Brepols. ISBN 978-2-503-54961-3.
- Ćirković, Sima (2004). The Serbs. Malden: Blackwell Publishing. ISBN 978-1-4051-4291-5.
- Greenberg, Robert D. (2004). Language and Identity in the Balkans: Serbo-Croatian and its Disintegration. New York: Oxford University Press. ISBN 9780191514555.
- Grickat-Radulović, Irena (1993). "Serbian Medieval Literary Language". Serbs in European Civilization. Belgrade: Nova, Serbian Academy of Sciences and Arts, Institute for Balkan Studies. pp. 146–150. ISBN 978-86-7583-015-3.
- Grković-Major, Jasmina (2021). "Serbian Church Slavonic influence on the Old Serbian language". Old Church Slavonic Heritage in Slavonic and Other Languages. Praha: Nakladatelství Lidové noviny. pp. 271–279.
- Hawkesworth, Celia; Ćalić, Jelena (2006). Colloquial Serbian: The Complete Course for Beginners. London and New York: Routledge.
- Isailović, Neven G.; Krstić, Aleksandar R. (2015). "Serbian Language and Cyrillic Script as a Means of Diplomatic Literacy in South Eastern Europe in 15th and 16th Centuries" ( (PDF)). Literacy Experiences concerning Medieval and Early Modern Transylvania. Cluj-Napoca: George Barițiu Institute of History. pp. 185–195. Archived from the original on 7 June 2024.
- Ivić, Pavle (1995). "Standard Language as an Instrument of Culture and the Product of National History". The History of Serbian Culture. Edgware: Porthill Publishers. pp. 41–51.
- Ivić, Pavle (2024). The Serbian people and their language (PDF). Novi Sad: Matica Srpska. Archived from the original (PDF) on 29 December 2025.
- Ivić, Pavle; Pešikan, Mitar (1995). "Serbian printing". The History of Serbian Culture. Edgware: Porthill Publishers. pp. 137–145.
- Okuka, Miloš (2008). Srpski dijalekti. Zagreb: Prosvjeta. ISBN 9789537611064.
- Paxton, Roger V. (1981). "Identity and Consciousness: Culture and Politics among the Habsburg Serbs in the Eighteenth Century". Nation and Ideology: Essays in Honor of Wayne S. Vucinich. Boulder, Colorado: East European Monographs. pp. 101–120.
- Polomac, Vladimir R. (2025). "The Serbian language in the diplomatic correspondence of the Hungarian kings and court officials in the 15th and 16th centuries: A philological perspective" ( (PDF)). The Eternal Cycle: neighbours, allies and/or rivals: Serbo/Hungarian relations in the Middle Ages (895–1541). Belgrade-Budapest: The Institute of History; HUN-REN Research Centre for Humanities, Institute of History. pp. 257–279. Archived from the original on 7 January 2026.
- Popović, Ljubomir (2004). "From standard Serbian through standard Serbo-Croatian to standard Serbian". Language in the Former Yugoslav Lands. Columbus: Slavica Publishers. pp. 25–40.
- Radovanović, Milorad; Bugarski, Nataša (2002). "Serbian Language at the End of the Century". Lexical Norm and National Language: Lexicography and Language Policy in South-Slavic Languages After 1989. München: Verlag Otto Sagner. pp. 164–172.
- Stojanović, Jelica R. (2020). The development path of the Serbian language and script (PDF). Podgorica: Matica srpska. Archived from the original (PDF) on 15 August 2024.
- Dimković-Telebaković, Gordana (2017). English and Serbian Language in Contact. Belgrade: Svet knjige.

=== Journals ===
- Albijanić, Aleksandar (1978). "Serbian Church Slavic Elements in 18th-Early 19th Century Vojvodina Sources". Die Welt der Slaven. 23 (2): 268–283.
- Albin, Alexander (1970). "The Creation of the Slaveno-Serbski Literary Language". The Slavonic and East European Review. 48 (113): 483–491. JSTOR 4206278.
- Belić, Aleksandar, ed. (1911). "Српски дијалектолошки зборник". Srpski dijalektološki zbornik [Recueil de dialectologie serbe]. 2.
- Greenberg, Robert D. (2000). "Language Politics in the Federal Republic of Yugoslavia: The Crisis over the Future of Serbian". Slavic Review. 59 (3): 625–640. doi:10.2307/2697348. JSTOR 2697348. S2CID 155546040.
- Gröschel, Bernhard (2003). "Postjugoslavische Amtssprachenregelungen – Soziolinguistische Argumente gegen die Einheitlichkeit des Serbokroatischen?" [Post-Yugoslav Official Languages Regulations – Sociolinguistic Arguments Against Consistency of Serbo-Croatian?]. Srpski Jezik (in German). 8 (1–2): 135–196. ISSN 0354-9259. COBISS 121971724.
- Kovačević, M. (2007). "Srpski jezik i njegove varijante". Srpsko Pitanje I Srbistika: 255–262.
- Mišić Ilić, B. (2015). "Srpski jezik u dijaspori: pogled iz lingvističkog ugla" [Serbian language in the diaspora]. Srpski Jezik. 20: 289–307.
- Nomachi, Motoki (2015). ""East" and "West" as Seen in the Structure of Serbian: Language Contact and Its Consequences" (PDF). Slavic Eurasian Studies. 28: 29–63.
- Okuka, M. (2009). "Srpski jezik danas: sociolingvistički status". Jezični varijeteti i nacionalni identiteti: 215–233.
- Petrović, T. (2001). "Speaking a different Serbian language: Refugees in Serbia between conflict and integration". Journal of Liberal Arts. 6 (1): 97–108.
- Radić, Jovanka; Miloradović, Sofija (2009). Piper, P. (ed.). "Српски језик у контексту националних идентитета: поводом српске мањине у Мађарској". ЈУЖНОСЛОВЕНСКИ Филолог. LXV: 153–179. GGKEY:00RD5D429DG.
- Radovanović, Milorad (2000). "From Serbo-Croatian to Serbian". Multilingua. 19 (1–2): 21–35. doi:10.1515/mult.2000.19.1-2.21. S2CID 143260283.
- Savić, Viktor (2016). "The Serbian Redaction of the Church Slavonic Language: From St. Clement, the Bishop of the Slavs, to St. Sava, the Serbian Archbishop" (PDF). Slověne: International Journal of Slavic Studies (in Serbian). 5 (2): 231–339. Archived from the original (PDF) on 4 September 2024.
- Sorescu-Marinković, Annemarie (2010). "Serbian Language Acquisition in Communist Romania" (PDF). Balcanica (41): 7–31. doi:10.2298/BALC1041007S.
- Vučković, M. (2009). "Савремена дијалектолошка истраживања у српској лингвистици и проблематика језика у контакту". Јужнословенски Филолог. 65: 405–423.
