= Crnojević noble family =

Medieval Serbian noble family

Crnojević Црнојевић
- Coat of Arms based from the first page of Cetinje Octoechos, on which the dynastic coat of arms was printed.
- Country: Kingdom of Serbia (1326–45); Serbian Empire (1345–71); Republic of Venice; Serbian Despotate (1421–35); Principality of Zeta
- Founded: before 1326, by Đuraš
- Final ruler: Đurađ IV (1496)
- Titles: Nobleman (Serbian: Ставилац, Властелин), Courtier (Дворски достојанственик, Челник), Knight (Витез), Baron (Italian: Barone), Duke (Војвода), Lord (Господар), Captain (Kaпetaн), Governor-General (Bey, Бeг); Grand Duke (Veliki Vojvoda/Велики војвода)
- Estates: (southern Montenegro, northern Albania; north of Lake Skadar) Zeta (Montenegro) main regions: Upper Zeta (1326–1362, 1403–1496); towns: Budva (1392-1396); Podgorica
- Dissolution: 1496

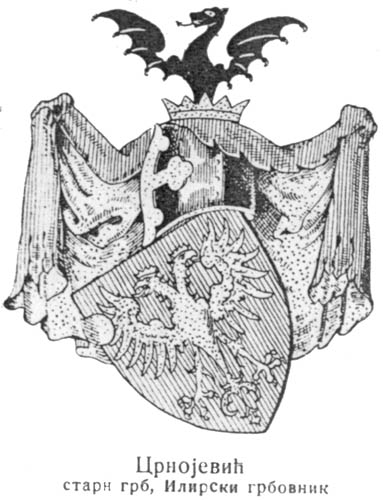
Coat of arms of the Crnojevići, according to the Illyrian Armorials.

Flag of the Crnojevići.

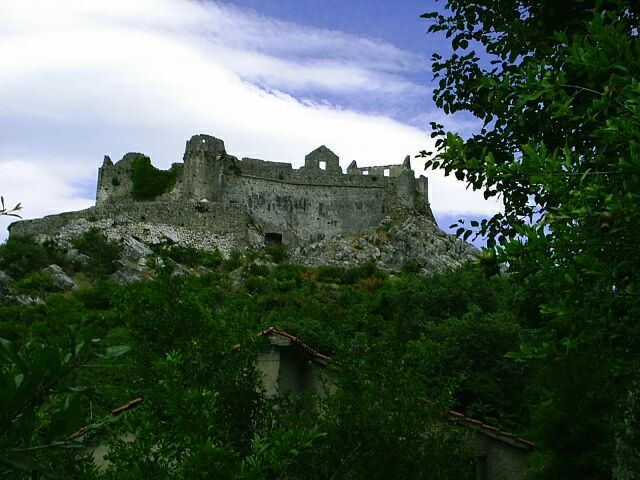
Žabljak Crnojevića, ruins of medieval fortress, once seat of the Crnojević family

The House of Crnojević (Serbian Cyrillic: Црнојевић, pl. Crnojevići / Црнојевићи) was a medieval Serbian noble family that held Zeta, or parts of it; a region north of Lake Skadar corresponding to southern Montenegro and northern Albania, from 1326 to 1362, then 1403 until 1496.

Its progenitor Đuraš Ilijić was the head of Upper Zeta in the Medieval Kingdom of Serbia and Empire (r. 1326–1362†), under Stefan Dečanski, Dušan the Mighty and Stefan Uroš V. Đuraš was killed in 1362 by the Balšić family, the holders of Lower Zeta (since 1360); Zeta was in the hands of the Balšići under nominal Imperial rule until 1421, when Serbian Despot Stefan Lazarević was given the province by Balša III (1403–1421). The family fought its rivals following the murder of Đuraš, and the Crnojevićs controlled Budva from 1392 until 1396, when Radič Crnojević was murdered by the Balšićs. They are mentioned again in 1403, as vassals of the Republic of Venice, taking power in their hereditary lands.

== History ==
=== Origins ===
During the 14th and throughout the 15th century, the Crnojević family became one of the most politically influential dynasties of the region. They ruled the territory of Zeta, north of Lake Shkodra, roughly corresponding to modern-day Southern Montenegro and Northern Albania. At times, they cooperated with the Balšić, a competing noble family, but most frequently fought them for control.

Đuraš Vrančić, a nobleman who served King Stefan Milutin (r. 1282–1321) in the Kingdom of Serbia, is the earliest known progenitor of the family. His grandson Đuraš Ilijić (son of Ilija Đurašević) was a military leader under Tsar Stefan Dušan and head of Upper Zeta from 1326 until 1362. Under Đuraš Ilijić, the family was referred to as Đurašević.

Đuraš Ilijić became advisor to the Serbian King Stefan of Dečani in 1326. Five years later, Đuraš supported Prince Dušan Nemanjić in overthrowing the King.

In 1355, the Croatian duchess and sister of Emperor Dušan, Jelena Nemanjić Šubić, had come greatly under pressure by the Hungarian King who attacked one of her cities in Croatia, (Skradin). Emperor Dušan dispatched Đuraš Ilijić to relieve the siege. He left with an army and his two brothers, Nikola and Vladin, as well as his sons and nephews. Đuraš successfully kept the city up to January 10, 1356, when Emperor Uroš, Dušan's successor, ordered him to deliver it to the Venetians.

Đuraš was liquidated by Balša I's sons as a rival in 1362. He was buried in the Church of Saint Michael on Prevlaka with the inscription "in Emperor's Stefan's name the third knight" (Serbian: у цара Стефана трети витез).

After this, the Đuraševići were greatly suppressed by the Balšić. They ruled in the areas of Budva and the Gulf of Kotor.

Crnoje Đurašević, the son of Đuraš, had three sons: Radič, Stefan, and Dobrivoje. Crnoje's descendants initially bore the surnames Crnojević-Đurašević but eventually dropped the former, and the family name became simplified as Crnojević.

=== Crnojević ===
Radič, the successor of Crnoje, emerged, together with his brothers Stefan and Dobrivoje, as the masters of Budva, at the end of the 14th century. He maintained close relations with the Republic of Dubrovnik, where he was an honorary citizen. At the same time, the relations with City of Kotor were bad. He frequently threatened Kotor and expanded his domain to include Grbalj and Paštrovići. As the Serbian Empire crumbled, the House of Crnoje became virtually independent in Upper Zeta (region around modern Cetinje. Radič was killed in combat in a war against the House of Balšić in 1396.

After the death of Radič, the Crnojevići, under the brothers Dobrivoj and Stefan, suffered a major decline. There were territorial losses to the Đuraševići, led by the brothers Đurađ and Aleksa (also called Lješ), both sons of the late Radič. They were first referred to in sources in 1403. They seemed to have been actively supporting Đurađ II's campaign against the Crnojevići in the late 1390s. They also played a major role in Sandalj Hranić's expulsion from Zeta through a campaign led by Đurađ. As a reward, Đurađ gave them Budva, as well as Saint Michael's Metohija (Grbalj). The Đuraševići used this period of support of the Balšićs to gain much of the Crnojević possessions in the mountains behind Kotor. Đuraš and Aleksa sided with Venetians and as their vassals ruled the area of Upper Zeta in 1403–1435.

The most important role in establishing the family's rule in Zeta belongs to Stefan I called "Stefanica" (1451–1465). He used the turmoil in Zeta and managed to become de facto ruler of the region. He secured a leading position in his family and married Mara, the daughter of prominent nobleman Gjon Kastrioti. After the fall of the southern part of Serbia under the Turks in 1455, Stefan acknowledged Venetian rule in return for autonomy on internal affairs and autonomy for the Orthodox Metropolitan.

His son Ivan (1465–1490), better known as Ivan-beg, started his rule with a war on the Venetians, but had to repent later in face of Turkish threat. In 1474, the Ottomans took Upper Zeta and in 1478 took his territory, which was centered around Žabljak. He fled to the coast and returned in 1481 following the death of Mehmet the Conqueror as a Turkish vassal, after already previously being a Venetian one. He was allowed to keep territory, which now comprised the coast above Kotor to Lake Skadar and north of the Zeta river. He moved the seat of Zeta Metropolitan from Prevlaka (Skadar Lake) to the more secure Cetinje in 1485 and soon it became his capital.

Ivan's son Đurađ (1490–1496) remained consistent to his father's policies, although he married a daughter of a Venetian noble. He founded the printing house of the Cetinje monastery in which the first book in the Cyrillic script of Church Slavonic among South Slavs was printed in 1494. When his contacts with the King of France on starting an anti-Ottoman war became known to the Turks, he had to flee Montenegro, which fell under direct Turkish rule.

He was succeeded by his brother Stefan II (1496–1499) who led the administration of Montenegro for the Ottoman Empire. Ivan's third son Staniša, now islamized and renamed as Skender-beg, ruled his ancestral lands from 1514 to 1528.

The descendants of Đurađ lived in Hungary and Venice where they died out in 1660 with the death of Ivan (Giovanni) Crnojević.

== Rulers ==
Lord of Zeta/Montenegro:

- Đuraš Ilijić (1326–1362†)
- Radič (fl. 1392-1396†)
- Đurađ III and Aleksa (1403–1435)
- Gojčin (1435–1451)
- Stefan I (1451–1465)
- Ivan I (1465–1490)
- Đurađ IV (1490–1496)
- Stefan II (1496–1499)

Sanjak-bey of Montenegro:

- Staniša-Skenderbeg (1514–1528)

== Family tree ==
- Đuraš Vrančić
  - Ilija Đurašević
    - Đuraš Ilijić
      - Crnoje Đurašević
        - Radič Crnojević married Jelena, later wife of Sandalj Hranić
          - Đurađ Đurašević Crnojević married unknown Zaharia
            - Đurašin
            - Gojčin
            - Stefan (Stefanica) Crnojević married Mara Kastrioti
              - Đurađ Crnojević married unknown Mocenigo
                - Catalina
                - Charles Michael (Petar) Crnojevic
              - Ivan Crnojević married firstly Voisava Arianiti, married secondly Mara Kosača
                - Đurađ Crnojević married firstly Yela Thopia, married secondly Elisabetta Erizzo
                  - Solomon married Elisabetta
                  - Konstantin married Maria Contarini
                    - Jovan (Giovanni) married firstly Paola Alberti, married secondly Orseta Vallaresso
                      - Viktor (Vittorio) married to Elena Calbo
                        - Jovan (Giovanni)
                        - Faustina married to Gasparo Luigi Delfin
                  - Ivan (Giovanni)
                  - Antonija (Antonia) married to Jerolim Zagurović
                    - Ivan Zagurović
                    - Anđelo Zagurović
                  - Unknown Daughter
                - Stefan
                  - Ivan II (Giovanni) married Caterina Orio
                    - Đurađ V (Giorgio V) married Catarina Doria
                - Staniša (Skenderbeg), Sanjak-bey of Montenegro
                - Unknown Daughter, married to Buća
                - Unknown Daughter, married to Drago family, cadet branch of Madi family
            - Unknown Son
          - Aleksa (Lješ, Alexius) Đurašević Crnojević
      - Stefan
      - Dobrovoj
    - Nikola
    - Vladin

== See also ==
- List of rulers of Montenegro

== Bibliography ==
- Fine, John Van Antwerp (1994). The Late Medieval Balkans: A Critical Survey from the Late Twelfth Century to the Ottoman Conquest. Michigan: The University of Michigan Press. ISBN 0-472-08260-4.
- Fajfrić, Željko (1998). Sveta loza Stefana Nemanje. Tabernakl. ISBN 9788685269066.
- Kovijanić, Risto (1963). Pomeni Crnogorski u kotorskim spomenicima (XIV–XVI vijek) [Montenegrin tribes in Bay of Kotor records (XIV–XVI century)] (PDF). Titograd: Istorijski institut SR Crne Gore.
- Veselinović, Andrija; Ljušić, Radoš (2008). Srpske dinastije (in Serbian). Službeni glasnik. ISBN 978-86-7549-921-3.
- Jovović, Vasilj (2013). "Porodične veze crnojevića sa okolnim feudalnim gospodarima" (PDF). maticacrnogorska.me. Matica crnogorska.
- Djukanović, Bojka (2023). Historical Dictionary of Montenegro. Rowman & Littlefield. ISBN 9781538139158.
