= Skender Bey Crnojević =

Serbian noble (died 1528/30)

Skender-bey Crnojević
- Sanjakbey of Montenegro

Sanjakbey of Montenegro
- Reign: 1514–1528
- Born: Staniša Crnojević
- Died: 1528/1530
- House: Crnojević
- Father: Ivan I Crnojević
- Mother: Voisava Arianiti

Staniša "Stanko" Crnojević (Serbian Cyrillic: Станиша “Станко“ Црнојевић; 1457–1528) was a member of the Crnojević noble family that held the Lordship of Zeta; Stanko was the heir to Ivan I Crnojević, who ruled from 1465 to 1490. In 1482 his father Ivan sent him and several of his close friends to the court of the Ottoman sultan Bayezid in order to guarantee his loyalty. Stanko converted to Islam and received the name Skender (Turkish for 'Alexander'), hence he is also known as Skender-bey Crnojević (Serbian Cyrillic: Скендербег Црнојевић), and became the Ottoman sanjakbey of the Sanjak of Montenegro in 1514–1528. He is enumerated in Serbian epic poetry, in which he is sometimes known as Maksim (Serbian Cyrillic: Максим).

== Life ==
Staniša (nickname: Stanko) was born in Upper Zeta (corresponding roughly to the southern half of Cetinje municipality, Montenegro), which at the time was a nominal vassal of the Republic of Venice, under Great Voivode Stefan I Crnojević (r. 1451–1465), Stanko's grandfather.

His father Ivan I Crnojević succeeded as the Lord of Zeta from 1465 to 1490. His mother, Voisava Arianiti, was the second born daughter of the Albanian nobleman Gjergj Arianiti and his first wife Princess Maria Muzaka, who ruled in Southern Albania. Stanko was the youngest of three brothers, his elder brothers were Đurađ Crnojević (Đorđe) and Stefan II Crnojević. By 1474, the Ottomans, who had already conquered Serbia and much of Albania, took Upper Zeta. Ivan failed to obtain Venetian military supplies, and to sustain an alliance with Vlatko Vuković, which saw his domains in Herzegovina fell to the Turks with the siege of Herceg Novi. Vlatko then turned against Ivan, and overran much of Zeta, including Žabljak in 1478, and Scutari in 1479. Ivan fled to his coastline in 1479, and managed to return in 1481 following the death of Mehmed the Conqueror. The new Ottoman sultan Bayezid II faced revolts in Albania, and did not want to face the same in the recently conquered Zeta.

The disagreements between the three Crnojević brothers proved fatal for Zeta, as it was conquered by the Ottoman Empire. In 1485, Stanko, disillusioned by the impossibility to succeed his father, went to Bayezid II in Istanbul and converted into Islam, receiving the name Skender. According to Zlatar, Ivan offered vassalage to Bayezid II, who accepted, but also took Stanko as his hostage. Ivan Crnojević lost his independence in foreign affairs, but retained complete autonomy at home. Ivan relocated his capital from destroyed Žabljak to Cetinje, where the Serbian Orthodox Metropolitanate of Zeta was to be seated (Eparchy of Cetinje).

Ivan was succeeded by Đorđe in 1490, who only ruled for six years; he conspired with Western rulers against Bayezid II in 1496, and was forced to leave the country after the Sultan had learnt this. Stefan hoped to succeed, but Bayezid II incorporated Zeta into the Ottoman Empire (known in Turkish as karadag – 'Black Mountain', from Venetian Montenegro), and ended the history of medieval Zeta. The Ottomans administrated Montenegro as any other newly conquered territory, though they were careful not to antagonize the local nobility. That is why they appointed Stanko as pasha.

Skender, henceforth known as Skender-bey Crnojević, was appointed sanjakbey of Montenegro and the neighbouring Albanian tribes in 1513, under Selim I. The next year, 1514, Bayezid II designated Montenegro a separate region (sanjak). He nominally ruled the region until 1528, but failed to subject the Montenegrin tribes to his authority. The tribes of Old Montenegro were since 1519 under the rule of the Serbian Orthodox Metropolitans of Zeta.

In a defter from 1523, he is mentioned as having 2,100 akıncı in the Crmnica region.

Skender-bey Crnojević ruled from his court at Rijeka Crnojevića. During the reign of Selim I, he was known as one of the most prominent Muslim administrators of Slavic origins in the northern reaches of the Ottoman Empire. Staniša Crnojević is known to have commanded an army of approximately 3,000 Akıncı, and he maintained correspondence with neighboring contemporaries, such as Gazi Husrev-beg.

The last mention of Skender-bey Crnojević is the Vranjina edict (Vranjinska povelja) which he wrote in 1527, confirming the rights of the Vranjina Monastery.

== Aftermath and legacy ==
After his death in 1530, a Christian inquisition and conflict began against his followers. The uprising was eventually put down by Gazi Husrev-beg, who was killed in battle against Christian clans. His men, however, succeeded in maintaining order in the region.

Mahmud Pasha Bushatli of Shkodër, who launched offensives into Montenegro in the 18th century, claimed direct descent from Skender-bey Crnojević. He was beheaded during the Battle of Krusi against the forces of Petar I Petrović-Njegoš, the Exarch of the Serbian Orthodox Church in Cetinje.

Skenderbey Crnojević is a main character in King Nikola's play The Empress of the Balkans (Balkanska Carica), written in 1894.

Staniša is enumerated in Serbian epic poetry in songs such as Sons of Ivan-bey, Death of Maksim Crnojević and The Wedding of Maksim Crnojević which is by far the longest Serbian epic song recorded. The song was introduced to the western audiences by Polish poet Adam Mickiewicz during his lectures at Collège de France.

Inspired by the epic song Serbian playwright Laza Kostić wrote the drama Maksim Crnojević, which would later serve as a source material for opera The Prince of Zeta by Petar Konjović.

== Family tree ==
Ancestry of Skender-Bey Crnojević

8. Đurađ Đurašević Crnojević
4. Stefan Crnojević
9. Busha Zaharia
2. Ivan Crnojević
10. Gjon Kastrioti
5. Mara Kastrioti
11. Voisava Kastrioti
1. Skender-Bey Crnojević
12. Komnen Arianiti
6. Gjergj Arianiti
13. Daughter of Nicholas Zaharia
3. Voisava Arianiti
14. Andrea III Muzaka
7. Maria Muzaka
15. Chiranna Zenevisi

== Annotations ==
1. His name at birth was Staniša Crnojević. His nickname was Stanko. The most used variations is his Islamic name in Serbian spelling: Skenderbeg (Skanderbeg). The English variation is Skender-Bey Crnojević. Other names are Skenderbeg Stanko Bušatlija or Bušatlija Stanko ('Stanko of Bušati', a village in Montenegro). In Serbian epic poetry he is sometimes known as Maksim.

== Notes ==
=== Bibliography ===
- The Cambridge medieval history, Volume 4. Cambridge Univ Press. 1923.
- Šekularac, Božidar. CRNOGORSKO SREDNJOVJEKOVLJE U NJEGOŠEVOM DJELU (PDF) (in Serbian). pp. 98–101.
- Österreichische Akademie der Wissenschaften in Wien (1920). Denkschriften, Vol 64 (in German). In Kommission bei R. Roher.
- Dinko Franetović-Bûre (1960). Historija pomorstva i ribarstva Crne Gore do 1918 godine (in Serbo-Croatian). Istorijski institut Narodne Republike Crne Gore. Archived from the original on 2024-02-25.
- Yugoslav review, Issue 205, Jugoslovenska Revija, 1983
- Srdja Pavlovic (2008). Balkan Anschluss: the annexation of Montenegro and the creation of the common South Slavic state. Purdue University Press. ISBN 9781557534651.
- Thomas Fleming (2002). Montenegro: the divided land. Chronicles Press. ISBN 9780961936495.
- Zdenko Zlatar (2007). The poetics of Slavdom: the mythopoeic foundations of Yugoslavia, Volume 2. Peter Lang. ISBN 9780820481357. Archived from the original on 2023-03-13.
- Fine, John Van Antwerp (1994). The Late Medieval Balkans: A Critical Survey from the Late Twelfth Century to the Ottoman Conquest. University of Michigan Press. ISBN 978-0-472-08260-5. Archived from the original on 2023-01-15.

Skender Bey Crnojević Crnojević noble family Born: 1457 Died: 1528
Regnal titles
First	sanjakbey of Montenegro; 1514–1528	Unknown
Preceded by Ivan II as Lord of Zeta	sanjakbey of Montenegro; 1514–1528	Unknown
