= Đurađ Crnojević =

Lord of Zeta (died 1514)

Đurađ IV Crnojević
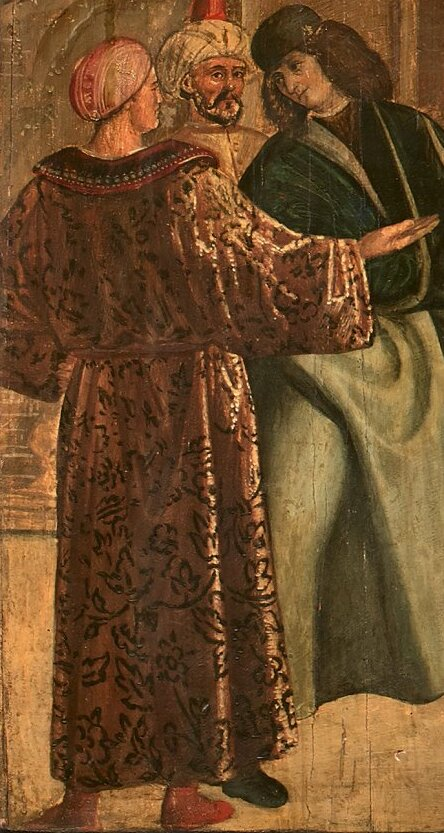
- Đurađ Crnojević, left, depicted on The Miracle of St. Tryphon by the workshop of Vittore Carpaccio, c. 1506

Lord of Zeta
- Reign: 1490–1496
- Predecessor: Ivan I Crnojević
- Successor: Stefan II Crnojević (nominal)
- Died: 1514
- Spouse: Yela Thopia; Elisabetta Erizzo
- Issue: Solomon Crnojević; Constantine Crnojević; Ivan Crnojević; Antonia Crnojević; Maria Crnojević; Unknown daughter
- House: Crnojević noble family
- Father: Ivan Crnojević
- Mother: Voisava Arianiti

Đurađ Crnojević (Serbian Cyrillic: Ђурађ Црноjeвић, Church Slavonic: Гюргь Цьрноевыкь; died 1514) was the last independent Serbian medieval Lord of Zeta of the Crnojević dynasty, who ruled from 1490 and 1496. He was succeeded by his brother, Stefan II, who ruled nominally as a vassal of the Ottoman Empire. The Crnojević family finally ceded power to the Metropolitans of Cetinje in 1516, thus transforming their remaining lands into a theocratic prince-bishopric.

== Early life and ancestry ==
Born into the Serbian nobility House of Crnojević, rulers of the Principality of Zeta, he was the eldest son of Ivan Crnojević and his wife, Voisava Arianiti, member of the Albanian nobility.

His grandmother from his father's side, Mara Kastrioti, was a sister of Skanderbeg. This made Đurađ Skanderbeg's grandnephew and through his mother he was the grandson of Gjergj Arianiti, member of the Arianiti family, and nephew of the Scanderbeg's wife, Andronika Kastrioti, herself a member of the Arianiti family.

== First Serbian printing house ==
He was the founder of the first Serbian printing house. Crnojević styled himself "Duke of Zeta". He was well known by his great education, knowledge of astronomy, geometry and other sciences.

== Life and reign ==
During his short-term reign he became famous for making efforts to spread the cultural heritage rather than for his political successes. The Ottomans made him leave Zeta in 1496. His brother Stefan inherited his position of the Lord of Zeta. In 1497 Venetians imprisoned Đurađ for some time, accusing him to be an Ottoman collaborator. He again spent some time in Venetian prison in period between 30 July and 25 October 1498. This time the Ottomans insisted that Venetians should put him into prison, which they eventually did. On 22 October 1499 he wrote his testament, which is considered as valuable literature work of its time.

In the spring of 1500 Đurađ Crnojević came to Scutari, based on the invitation of Feriz Beg who instructed Crnojević to travel to Istanbul. In Istanbul Crnojević officially ceded his possessions to the sultan who granted him an estate (timar) in Anatolia to govern it as its sipahi.

Although he was removed from the historical scene, his books remained as a great contribution to the Serbian culture. With the help of Hieromonk Makarije he printed five books of importance to the Serbian cultural heritage: Oktoih prvoglasnik (1493/94), Oktoih petoglasnik (1494), Psaltir s posljedovanjem (1495), Trebnik (prayer book; 1495/96), and Četvorojevanđelje (probably 1496).

== Marriages and children ==
Coat of Arms of Crnojević dynasty

Đurađ Crnojević was married twice. His first wife was Yela Thopia, daughter of Karl Muzaka Thopia and Zanfina Muzaka. They had one son:

- Solomon Crnojević (d. 1521); as the eldest son, he was sought by the Montenegrins from the Highlands to govern a part of Montenegro, but the Republic of Venice did not allow it so as not to offend the Ottoman authorities. He was married to Elisabetta and had no children. Solomon was killed in Hungary in 1521 during the Hungarian–Ottoman War.

His second marriage, in 1490, was to Isabetha (Elisabetta) Erizzo (d. 1522). She was the daughter of the noted Venetian nobleman and diplomat Antonio Erizzo, member of the San Moisè branch of the Erizzo family. Antonio held numerous high-ranking state offices and eventually attained the honor of Procurator, a position that often preceded election to the office of Doge. In 1478, he was one of five candidates for this highest honor in the Republic, although Giovanni Mocenigo was ultimately elected. At the time of his daughter’s marriage, Antonio served as Vicedomino of Ferrara. During their exile in Venice, Đurađ and Elisabetta lived in the Palazzo Zaguri. They had five children:

- Konstantin (Constantine) Crnojević (1491-1536); he was married to Maria Contarini, daughter of Giovanni Matteo Contarini. They lived in Venice and had a son Ivan (Giovanni), with written records of their descendants existing up until the second half of the 17th century, when the family line became extinct.
- Ivan (Giovanni) Crnojević (b. 1493); he never married and held the position of prison governor in Padua.
- Antonija (Antonia) Crnojević (b. 1495); she married Girolamo Zaguri, member of the Zaguri family.
- Unknown daughter; married into the Venetian nobility.
- Unknown daughter; married into the Hungarian nobility.

== The Testament of Đurađ Crnojević ==
A notarial facsimile of the official procedure for the proclamation of Đurađ Crnojević's last will is preserved (Appendix of the autograph). The document, copied in 103 densely written lines by the ducal notary, constitutes the full testament. It is composed of three distinct, yet legally closely related, parts that were created over a period of eighteen years.

On 22 October 1499, Đurađ Crnojević personally wrote his last will in the Serbian language using the Cyrillic script. As translations from all foreign languages were required in Venice, a statement was added by the late Stefano Pasquale, dated 20 April 1514 in the office of the Gastaldo, confirming that the text of the testament’s translation “from the Slavic language and script,” which was presented to him, was indeed authentic and personally written by Đurađ Crnojević “faithfully word for word… without altering or distorting the meaning of any matter.”

Pasquale’s Italian translation was later copied in 1517 by the ducal notary Jacopo Grasolari and incorporated into the full document, granting it official legal force and formally recognizing Đurađ Crnojević’s last will as a valid testament. This constitutes the second part of the document.

The third part consists of the procedural introduction and concluding text in Latin, which outlines the process by which the testament was officially proclaimed. On the official notarial document of the testament, the first witness was the Venetian Doge Leonardo Loredan himself, and the other two witnesses were the councilors Paolo Trevisan and Nicola Cornaro. The procedure was only completed at the beginning of January 1517, and the testament was declared valid and given full legal force.

== Family tree ==
Ancestry of Đurađ Crnojević

8. Đurađ Đurašević Crnojević
4. Stefan Crnojević
9. Busha Zaharia
2. Ivan Crnojević
10. Gjon Kastrioti
5. Mara Kastrioti
11. Voisava Kastrioti
1. Đurađ Crnojević
12. Komnen Arianiti
6. Gjergj Arianiti
13. Daughter of Nicholas Zaharia
3. Voisava Arianiti
14. Andrea III Muzaka
7. Maria Muzaka
15. Chiranna Zenevisi, Lady of Grabossa

== Sources ==
- Veselinović, Andrija; Ljušić, Radoš (2008). Srpske dinastije. Službene glasink. ISBN 978-86-7549-921-3.
- Plamenac, Rade Turov; Bojović, Jovan R. (1997). Memoari. CID. ISBN 9788649500471.
- Likovna (1990). Зборник Матице српске за ликовне уметности. Матица.
- Martinović, Dušan J. (1983). Portreti: bio-bibliografski pregled. Centralna narodna biblioteka SR Crne Gore "Đurđe Crnojević". ISBN 9788670790209.
- Plavšić, Lazar (1959). Srpske štamparije: od kraja XV do sredine XIX veka. Udruženje grafičkih preduzeća Jugoslavije.
- Emecen, Feridun M. (2021). The Teftiş Register (1497) of Đurađ Crnojević, Bey/Lord of Montenegro. THE JOURNAL OF OTTOMAN STUDIES.

Đurađ Crnojević Crnojević family Born: unknown Died: 1514
Preceded by Ivan	Lord of Zeta; 1489–1496	Succeeded by Stefan II
