= Sanjak of Scutari =

1479–1913 Ottoman administrative unit in north Albania

Sanjak of Shkodra İşkodra Sancağı (Turkish) Sanxhaku i Shkodrës (Albanian) Скадарски Санџак (Serbian)
- Sanjak of the Ottoman Empire
- 1479–1913
- Flag Coat of arms

- The sanjak highlighted within the Scutari vilayet (c. 1900)
- Capital: Scutari (present-day Shkodër)
- History
  - Ottoman Empire captured Shkodra from Republic of Venice: 1479
  - Disestablished: 30 May 1913
Preceded by
Venetian Albania
League of Lezhë
Principality of Dukagjini
Succeeded by
Independent Albania
- Today part of: Albania; Kosovo; Montenegro

The Sanjak of Scutari or Sanjak of Shkodra (Albanian: Sanxhaku i Shkodrës; Serbian: Скадарски санџак; Turkish: İskenderiye Sancağı or İşkodra Sancağı) was one of the sanjaks of the Ottoman Empire. It was established after the Ottoman Empire acquired Shkodra after the siege of Shkodra in 1478–9. It was part of the Eyalet of Rumelia until 1867, when it became a part, together with the Sanjak of Skopje, of the newly established Scutari Vilayet. In 1912 and the beginning of 1913 it was occupied by members of the Balkan League during the First Balkan War. In 1914 the territory of Sanjak of Scutari became a part of the Principality of Albania, established on the basis of the peace contract signed during the London Conference in 1913.

== History ==
=== Background and formation ===
With short interruptions, the territory of northern Albania, including what would become the Sanjak of Scutari, remained under the rule of the Serbian feudal lords of the states of Duklja and Raška for centuries.

After the fall of the Serbian Empire in 1371, local nobility came to prominence, such as the Balšić noble family. In 1396 the city came under the control of the Republic of Venice. When the Ottoman Empire acquired Shkodra from Venice after the siege of Shkodra in 1479, it became the centre of the Sanjak of Scutari.

=== Acquisition of Zeta ===
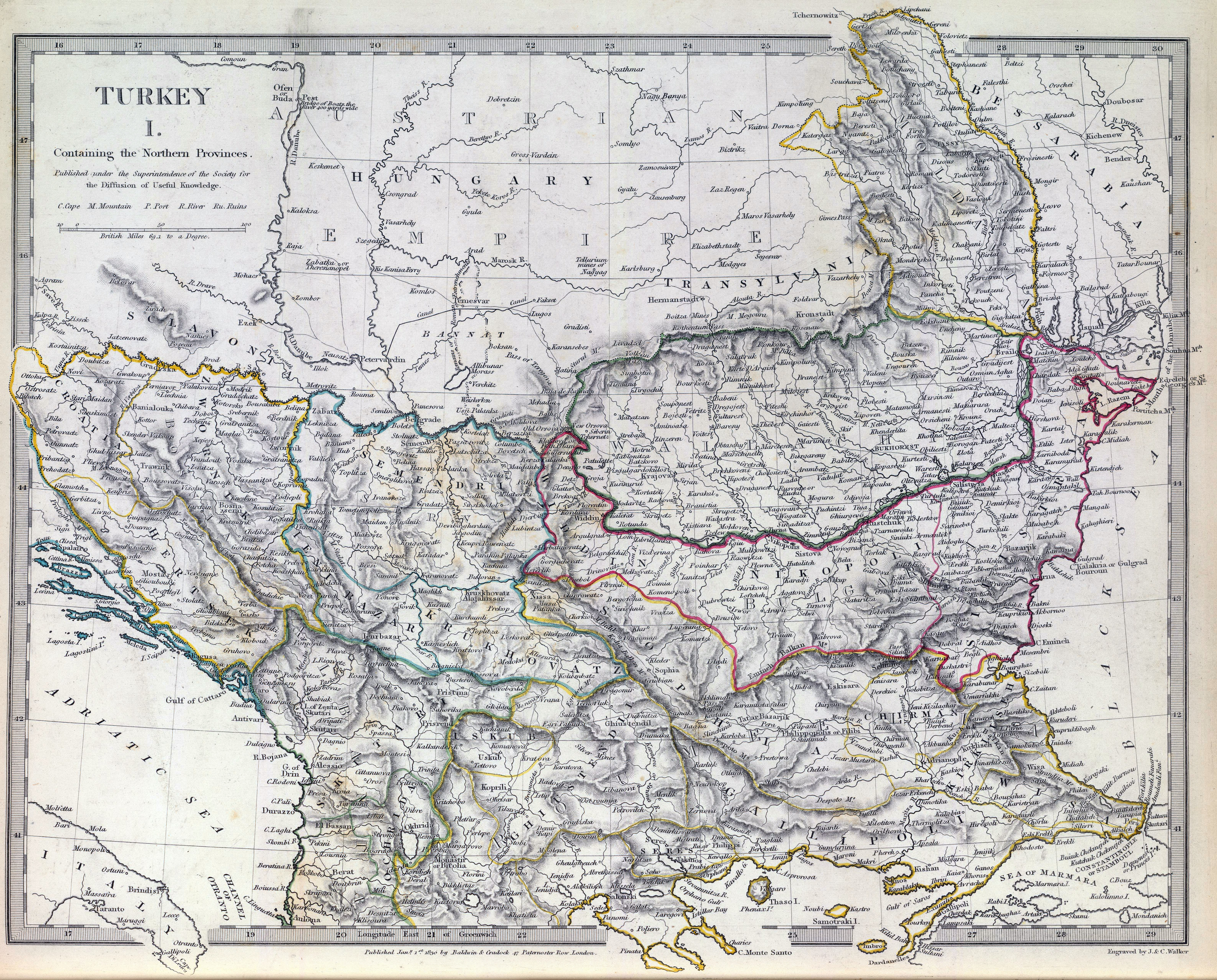
The Sanjak of Skutari in 1829, located in the lower-left corner.

Since he was appointed on the position of sanjakbey of Scutari in 1496, Firuz Bey had the intention to annex Zeta to the Ottoman Empire. Đurađ Crnojević who controlled the neighboring Principality of Zeta maintained frequent correspondence with other Christian feudal states with the intention to establish an anti-Ottoman coalition. When his brother, Stefan II, betrayed him to the Ottomans in 1496, Đurađ proposed to accept the suzerainty of the Ottoman Empire if Firuz Bey accepted to recognize him as governor in Zeta. Firuz Bey refused this proposal and invited Đurađ to either come to Scutari to clarify his anti-Ottoman activities or to flee Zeta. When Firuz Bey attacked Zeta with strong forces in 1496 Đurađ decided to flee to Venice. In 1497 Firuz Bey captured Grbalj and put Zeta under his effective military control, although it was still nominally part of the Zeta governed by Stefan II Crnojević. In 1499 Firuz Bey formally annexed Zeta to the territory of his Sanjak of Scutari, and Zeta lost its status as an independent state. In 1514, this territory was separated from the Sanjak of Scutari and established as a separate sanjak, under the rule of Skenderbeg Crnojević. When he died in 1528, the Sanjak of Montenegro was reincorporated into the Sanjak of Scutari as a unique administrative unit (vilayet) with a certain degree of autonomy.

=== Late 16th and early 17th century ===
The census of 1582—1583 registered the "vilayet of the Black Mountain" (vilayet-i Kara Dağ) as a separate administrative unit within the Sanjak of Scutari. The vilayet consisted of the following nahiyah and villages: Grbavci with 13 villages, Župa 11, Malonšići 7, Plješivci 14, Cetinje 16, Rijeka 31, Crmnica 11, Paštrovići 36 and Grbalj 9 villages; a total of 148 villages.

Marino Bizzi, the Archbishop of Bar (Antivari), in his 1610 report stated that the name of the sanjakbey of Scutari was Ali Pasha.

=== Pashalik of Scutari ===
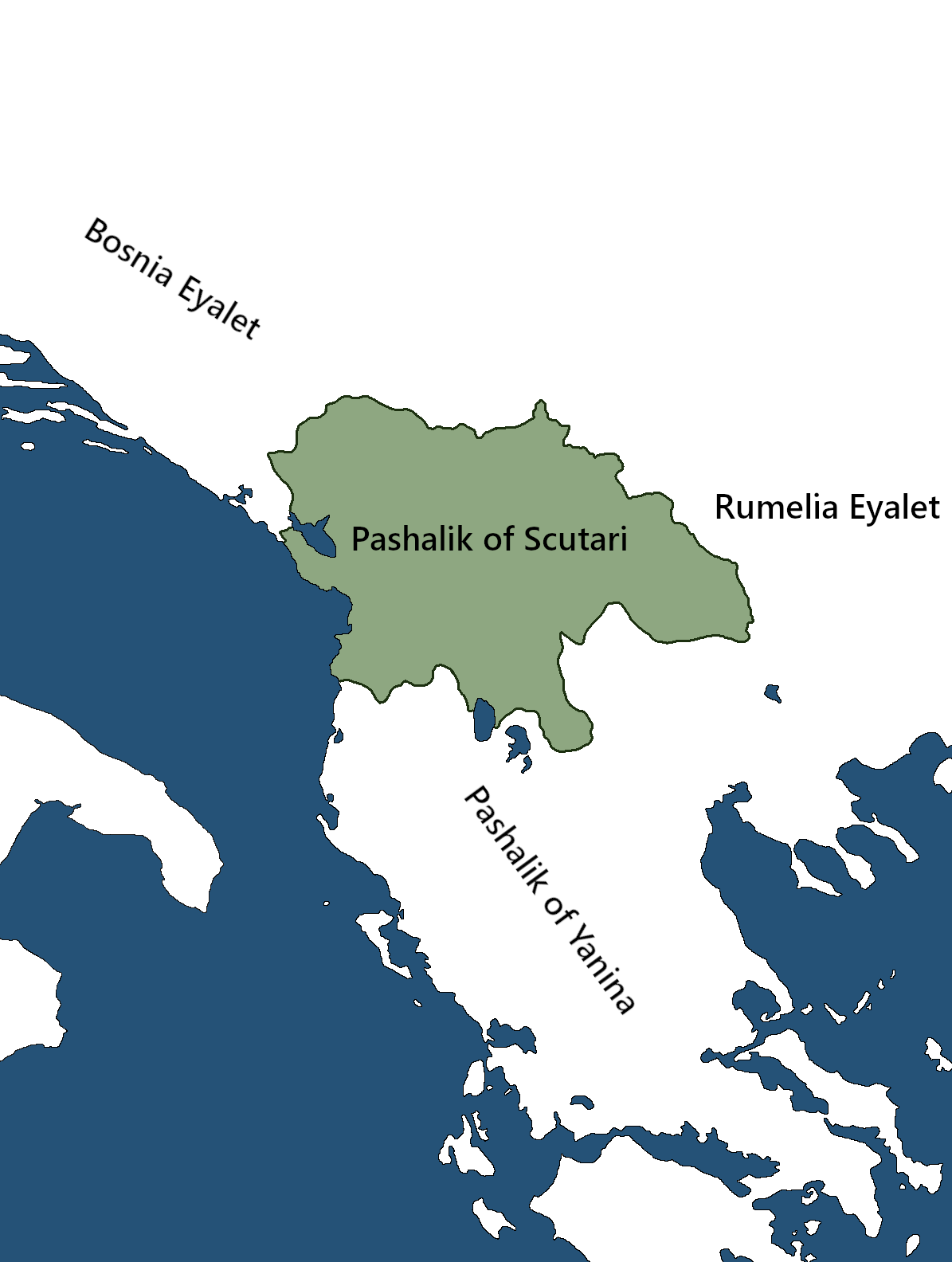
The Pashalik of Scutari under the Bushati family.

In the period between 1757 and 1831, the Sanjak of Scutari was elevated to the Pashalik of Scutari, a semi-autonomous pashalik under the Ottoman Empire created by the Albanian Bushati family. Its territory encompassed parts of modern-day northern Albania and Montenegro, with its center in the city of Shkodër. The weakening of Ottoman central authority and the timar system of land ownership brought anarchy to the West Balkans region of Ottoman Empire. In the late 18th century, two centers of power emerged in this region: Shkodër, under the Bushati family; and Janina, under Ali Pasha of Tepelenë. Both regions cooperated with and defied the Sublime Porte as their interests required.

=== Scutari Vilayet ===
Before 1867, Shkodër (İşkodra) was a sanjak within the Rumelia Eyalet. In 1867, the Sanjak of Scutari merged with the Sanjak of Üsküb (Skopje), forming the Scutari Vilayet. The vilayet was subsequently divided into three sanjaks: İșkodra (Scutari), Prizren and Dibra. In 1877, the Sanjak of Prizren was transferred to the Kosovo Vilayet, and the Sanjak of Dibra was transferred to the Monastir Vilayet. Following the territorial transfers, the Sanjak of Scutari was subsequently divided into two sanjaks: Sanjak of Scutari and Sanjak of Durrës. Following the invasion of Montenegrin forces during the Montenegrin-Ottoman War between 1876 and 1878, ownership of the cities of Bar, Podgorica, Spuž and Ulcinj was transferred from the Sanjak of Scutari to the Principality of Montenegro.

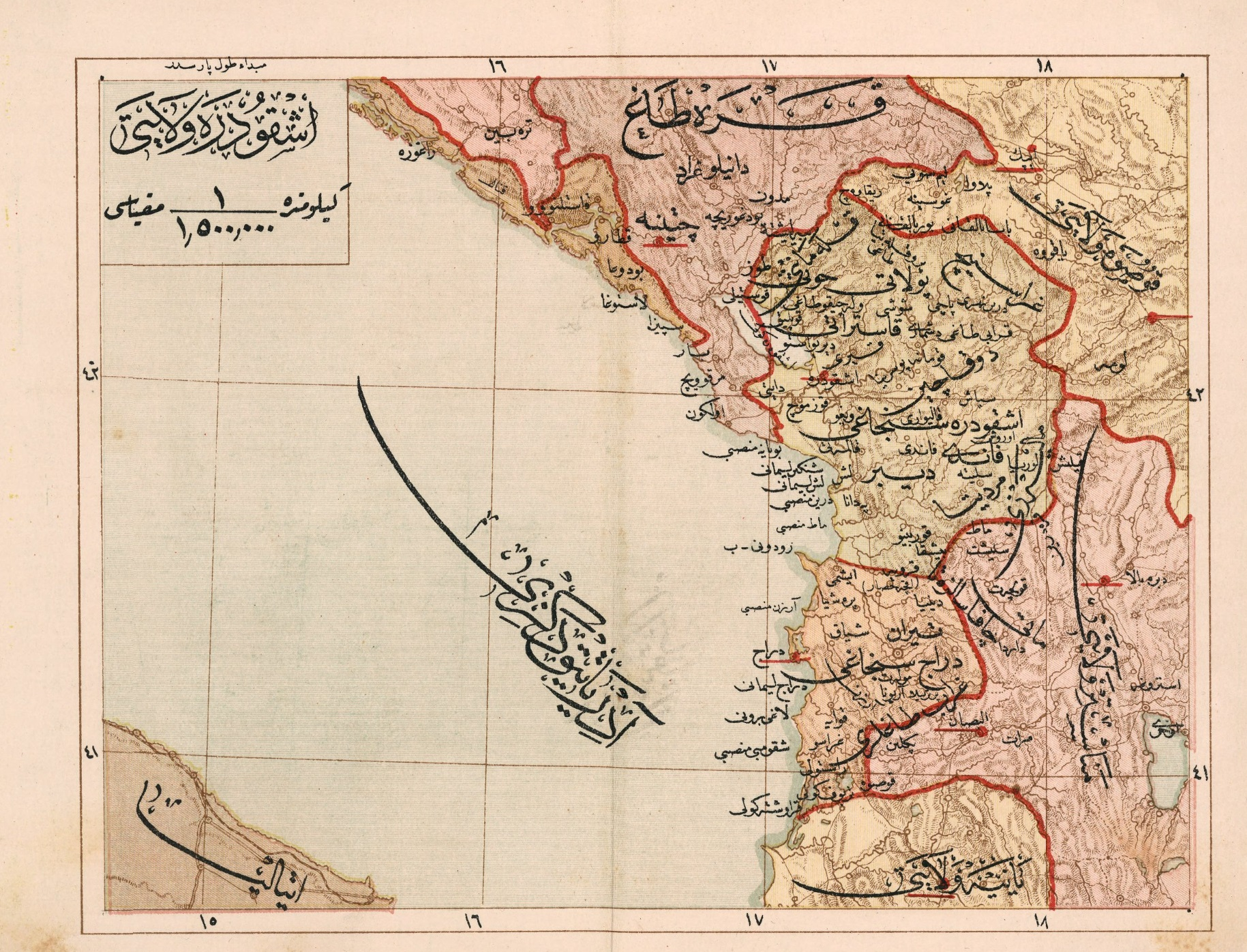
The Sanjak of Shkodra (1907)

In 1900, the Vilayet of Scutari was disestablished, demerging into two separate sanjaks: Sanjak of Scutari and Sanjak of Durrës.

=== Disestablishment ===
In 1912 and the beginning of 1913 it was occupied by members of the Balkan League during the First Balkan War. In 1914 the territory of the Sanjak of Scutari became a part of the Principality of Albania, established on the basis of the peace contract signed during the London Conference in 1913.

== Demographics and social organisation ==
The majority religious population in İşkodra sanjak were Catholics.

The Albanian Malisors (highlanders) lived in three geographical regions within İşkodra sanjak. Malesia e Madhe (great highlands) with its religiously mixed Catholic-Muslim five large tribes (Hoti, Kelmendi, Shkreli, Kastrati and Gruda) and seven small tribes; Malesia e Vogel (small highlands) with seven Catholic tribes such as the Shala, Shoshi, Toplana, Nikaj; and Mirdita, which was also a large powerful tribe that could mobilise 5,000 irregular troops. The government estimated the military strength of Malisors in İşkodra sanjak as numbering over 30,000 tribesmen and Ottoman officials were of the view that the highlanders could defeat Montenegro on their own with limited state assistance. Ottoman control over the highland areas of İşkodra sanjak was limited. In the 1880s, from an Albanian point of view the sanjak of İşkodra belonged to the region of Gegënia.

Based on the people names registered in the census, it may be concluded that population of Sanjak of Scutari was mainly composed of Albanians and Serbs (Orthodox, Catholic and Muslim). There was also certain number of Vlachs, Turks and other people present, mainly in towns.

=== 1485 census ===
The first Ottoman census of the Sanjak of Scutari was organized in 1485. It was the third Ottoman census which was organized on the territory within modern Republic of Albania. The first census was organized in 1431 on the territory of Sanjak of Albania. The 1485 census shows that Sanjak of Scutari consisted of four kazas: İşkodra (Shkodër), Depedöğen (Podgorica), İpek (Peć), and Bihor. The kazas were divided into smaller administrative units, nahiyah.

=== 1582—1583 census ===
The census organized in period 1582—1583 shows that there were many nahiyah within Sanjak of Scutari with following number of villages:

- Shkodër with 128 villages
- Dushmani with 24 villages; majority had Albanian personal names, minority Serbian.
  - Toponyms show some South Slavic influence
  - Islamisation was slowly occurring within the nahiyah, based on the presence of characteristically Muslim names within its population
- Zabojana with 48 villages; majority had Albanian personal names, minority Serbian.
- Mrkojevići with 9 villages; majority had Serbian personal names, minority Albanian.
- Krajina with 18 villages; majority had Albanian personal names.
  - Toponyms show an overwhelming South Slavic influence
- Gorje Šestan (Džebel-i Šestan) with 7 villages; majority had Serbian personal names, minority Albanian.
- Podgorica with 13 villages; majority had Serbian personal names, minority Albanian.
- Žabljak with 8 villages; majority had Serbian personal names, minority Albanian.
- Hoti with 8 villages; majority had Albanian personal names, while a minority had Serbian
- Bjelopavlići with 6 villages; overwhelming majority had Serbian personal names
- Vražegrmci with 16 villages; overwhelming majority had Serbian personal names
- Pobor with 11 villages; overwhelming majority had Serbian personal names
- Kelmendi with 2 villages; majority had Albanian personal names, minority Serbian.
- Kuči with 13 villages; majority had Serbian personal names, minority Albanian.
- Peja : 23 villages in the Nahiya of Peja were inhabited by an Albanian majority; 85 villages had mixed Albanian-Slavic anthroponomy, and the rest contained almost exclusively Slavic anthroponomy
  - By the 1582 Defter, the city of Peja itself had been significantly Islamised - several cases exist where Muslim inhabitants have a blend of Islamic and Albanian anthroponomy (such as the widespread Deda family - Rizvan Deda, Haxhi Deda, Ali Deda...). The Muslim neighbourhoods include Xhamia Sherif, Sinan Vojvoda, Piri bej, Ahmed Bej, Hysein, Hasan Çelebi, Mustafa bej, Mahmud Kadi, Orman, Kapishniça, Mesxhidi Haxhi Mahmud, Bali bej and Çeribash. The Christian neighbourhoods include Gjura Papuxhi, Nikolla (abandoned), Nikolla Vukman (abandoned), Andrija (abandoned) and Olivir. The inhabitants of the two Christian neighbourhoods - Olivir and Gjura Papuxhi - had a blend of characteristically Albanian and Slavic/Orthodox anthroponomy. The defter from 1582 indicates that the town of Peja had a Muslim majority with majority Muslim names. The town was 90% Islamised.
- Altin (Altun li) with 41 villages; Most of the villages in the Nahiya of Altun-ili were dominated by inhabitants with Albanian anthroponomy. In 1570, the majority of the inhabitants of Gjakova as a settlement itself were recorded with Albanian anthroponomy
- Petrišpan with 33 villages
- Budimlje with 31 villages; overwhelming majority had Serbian personal names
  - Presence of Muslim inhabitants shown in one village within the nahiyah
- Komoran with 20 villages; overwhelming majority had Serbian personal names
  - Presence of Muslim inhabitants shown in two villages within the nahiyah
- Plav with 18 villages; all inhabitants had Serbian personal names
  - No Muslim inhabitants within the nahiyah
- Zla Rijeka with 12 villages

There was a total of 709 villages in the Sanjak of Scutari.

Additionally, a smaller part of Ottoman census from 1582 to 1583 dealt with Montenegro (Vilâyet-i Karaca-dağ) as separate administrative unit within Sanjak of Scutari. This part consisted of following nahiyah and villages: Grbavci with 13 villages, Župa with 11 villages, Malonšići with 7 villages, Plješivci with 14 villages, Cetinje with 16 villages, Rijeka with 31 villages, Cernica (Crmnica) with 11 villages, Paštrovići with 36 villages, Grbalj with 9 villages. There was a total of 148 villages belonging to the Montenegrin subdivision.

The 1582—1583 census shows 857 villages and several towns including Shkodër (İşkodra), Peć (İpek), Podgorica (Depedöğen), Bar (Bar) and Ulcinj (Ülgün).

=== 1874 estimation ===
According to Russian consulate Ivan Yastrebov's estimations, there were 80.000 Catholic males, 20.000 Orthodox males, and 9.500 Muslim males. The majority of the population spoke the Albanian language. He asserted that the Orthodox, and a number of Catholics and Muslims spoke the Serbian language.

== Governors ==
- Feriz Beg (fl. 1495–1512), served 1496–1502
- Ali Pasha (fl. 1610)
- Süleyman (fl. 1685–1692)
- Mehmed Bushati (1757–1775)
- Kara Mahmud Pasha (1775–1796)
- Ibrahim Pasha (1796–1810)
- Mustafa Pasha Bushatli (1810–1831)
- Osman Pasha Skopljak (1843–1854)

== See also ==
- Sanjak of Montenegro

== Sources ==
- Goodwin, Godfrey (2013). The Janissaries. Saqi Essentials. ISBN 978-0-86356-781-0.
- Preto, Paolo (January 2010). I servizi segreti di Venezia. Spionaggio e controspionaggio ai tempi della Serenissima. Il Saggiatore. ISBN 978-88-565-0164-3.
- Ћоровић, Владимир; Петровић, Драгољуб С (2006). Историја Срба. Дом и школа. ISBN 9788683751303.
- Bojović, Boško I. (1998). Raguse (Dubrovnik) et l'Empire ottoman (1430-1520): les actes impériaux ottomans en vieux-serbe de Murad II à Sélim Ier. Eds. de l&Association "Pierre Belon". ISBN 978-2-910860-06-6.
- Rizaj, Skënder (1982). Kosova gjatë shekujve XV, XVI dhe XVII: administrimi, ekonomia, shoqëria dhe lëvizja popullore. Rilindja.
- Pavle S. Radusinović (1978). Stanovništvo Crne Gore do 1945. godine: opšta istorijsko-geografska i demografska razmatranja. Srpska akademija nauka i umetnosti.
- Марковић, Томаш (1969). Историја школства и просвјете у Црној Гори. Завод за издавање уџбеника Социјалистичке Републике Србије.
- Plavšić, Lazar (1959). Srpske štamparije: od kraja XV do sredine XIX veka. Udruženje grafičkih preduzeća Jugoslavije.
- Press, Illinois (1948). Illinois Studies in the Social Sciences. University of Illinois Press.
- Jovanović, Jagoš (1947). Stvaranje Crnogorske države i razvoj Crnogorske nacionalnosti: istorija Crne Gore od početka VIII vjeka do 1918 godine. Obod.
- društvo, Cetinjsko istorijsko (1935). Zapisi; Glasnik cetinjskog istorijskog društva.
- Jireček, Konstantin (1923). Istorija Srba. Izdavačka knjižarnica G. Kona.
