= Voisava Arianiti =

15th century Albanian Princess

Voisava Arianiti Vojsava Arianiti
- Princess Consort of Zeta
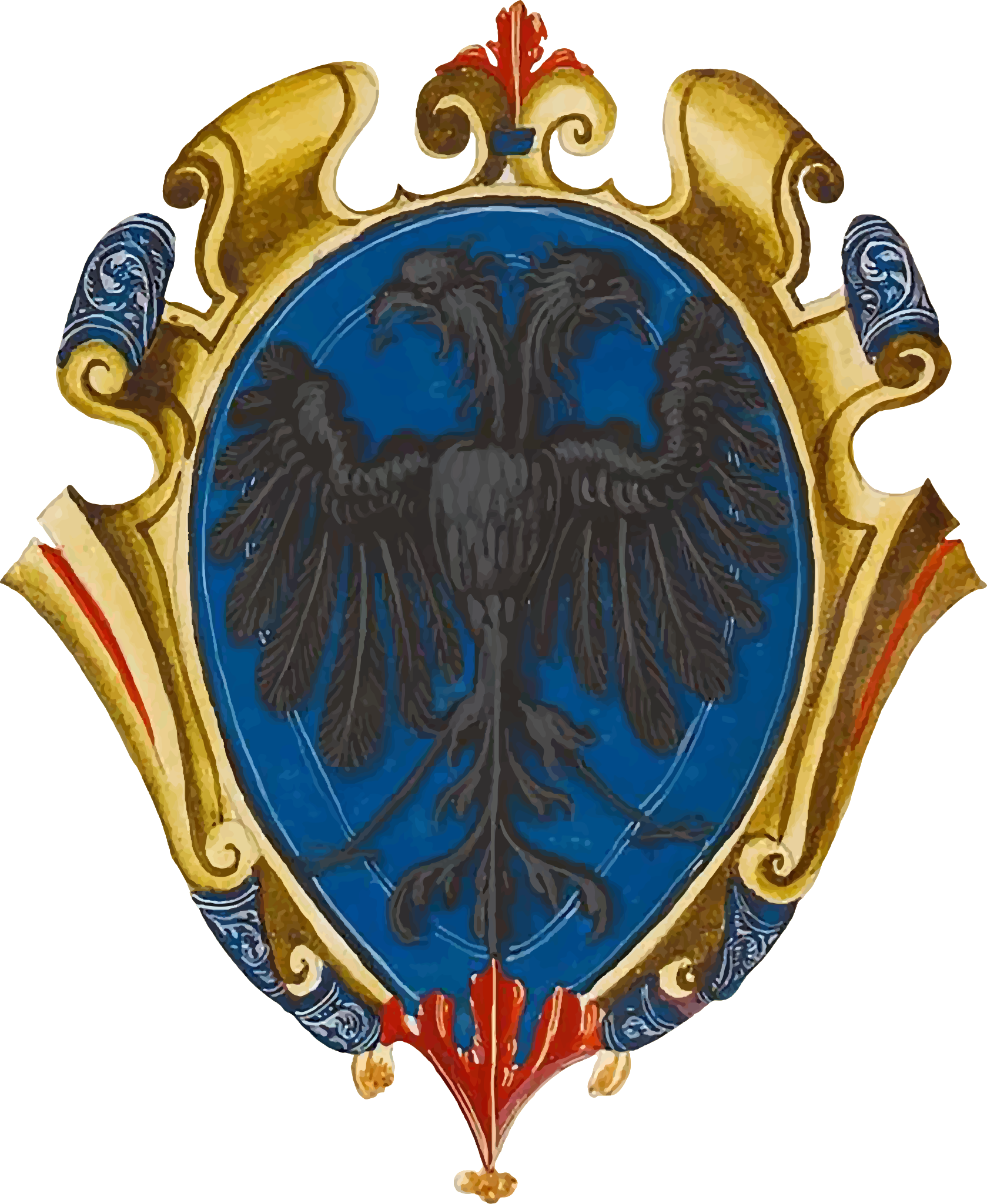
- Coat of arms of the Arianiti family

Princess Consort of Zeta
- Tenure: 1465 – 1469
- Predecessor: Mara Kastrioti
- Successor: Yela Thopia
- Born: c. 1429
- Died: before July 1469
- Spouse: Ivan Crnojević
- Issue: Đurađ Crnojević; Stefan II Crnojević; Skender Bey Crnojević
- Dynasty: Arianiti
- Father: Gjergj Arianiti
- Mother: Maria Muzaka
- Religion: Eastern Orthodoxy

Voisava Arianiti (Albanian: Vojsava Arianiti) also known as Voisava Arianiti Comneno, Donna Voisava, Lady Voisava, Goisava or Gojisava was a 15th century Albanian princess from the House of Arianiti. She became Princess Consort of Zeta after her marriage with Ivan Crnojević who was the Lord of Zeta from 1465 until 1490.

== Life and marriage ==
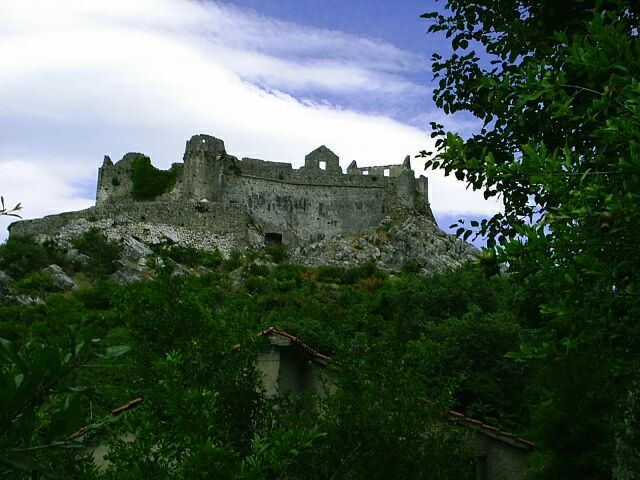
Žabljak Crnojevića was the main residence of Ivan Crnojević and his wife and cousin, Voisava Arianiti in Zeta Principality

Voisava Arianiti, born around 1429, was the second-born daughter Gjergj Arianiti, an Albanian prince and military leader, and his wife Maria Muzaka. She belonged to the noble House of Arianiti, a powerful family in 15th-century Albania. Not much is known about her early life. Voisava was the sister-in-law of Skanderbeg, the famed Albanian leader and military commander, through her elder sister Donika's marriage to him.

Voisava married Ivan Crnojević, son of Stefan Crnojević, who became Lord of Zeta in 1465 following his father’s death. During his rule, Ivan established his main residence in the fortress town of Žabljak, which served as the political and administrative center of Zeta. As his wife, Voisava would have lived there and likely taken part in the social and courtly life of the region. Early in his leadership, Ivan faced conflict with the city of Kotor, supported by the Republic of Venice. Despite this, he secured backing from local communities such as Grbalj and Paštrovići, and peace was reached after several skirmishes in 1466. At the same time, the expanding Ottoman Empire was weakening neighboring rulers, including the Kosača family. Following the death of Stefan Vukčić Kosača in 1466, Ivan forged peaceful ties with his successor, Vlatko Kosača, which brought relative stability to Zeta during Voisava’s lifetime.

== Death ==
Voisava Arianiti died sometime before July 1469. After her death, Ivan Crnojević married Mara Vukčić-Kosača, sister of Vlatko Hercegović, the second Duke of Saint Sava, strengthening political ties between the two families. In the early 1470s, facing increasing Ottoman pressure, both Ivan and Vlatko accepted Ottoman suzerainty.

== Family ==
Voisava Arianiti married Ivan Crnojević. The couple had three children:

- Đurađ Crnojević, Lord of Zeta from 1490 to 1496, married Yela Thopia then Isabetha (Elisabetta) Erizzo. He had 6 children: Lord Solomon Crnojević, Lord Constantine Crnojević, Ivan (Giovanni) Crnojević and three daughters
- Stefan II Crnojević, Lord of Zeta from 1496 to 1499
- Skender Bey Crnojević, became Sanjak-bey of the Sanjak of Montenegro from 1514 to 1528

== Family tree ==
Ancestors of Voisava Arianiti

8. Unknown
4. Komnen Arianiti
9. Unknown
2. Gjergj Arianiti
10. Nikollë Zaharia
5. Lady of Zaharia
11. Unknown
1. Voisava Arianiti
12. Gjin I Muzaka
6. Andrea III Muzaka
13. Zanfina Arianiti Comninata
3. Maria Muzaka
14. Gjon Zenebishi
7. Chiranna Zenevisi, Lady of Grabossa
15. Unknown

== See also ==
- Arianiti family

== Bibliography ==
- Elsie, Robert (2003). Early Albania: A Reader of Historical Texts, 11th-17th Centuries. Harrassowitz. ISBN 978-3-4470-4783-8.
- Fine, John V. A. (1994). The Late Medieval Balkans: A Critical Survey from the Late Twelfth Century to the Ottoman Conquest. University of Michigan Press. ISBN 978-0-4720-8260-5.
- Hopf, Karl (1873). Chroniques greco-romanes inedites ou peu connues [Unpublished or little-known Greco-Roman chronicles] (in French). Weidmann.
- Milošević, Dmitar I. (2006). Rodoslovi srpskih dinastija [Genealogies of Serbian dynasties] (in Serbian). Knjiga Komerc. ISBN 978-8-6771-2157-0.
- Sainty, Guy Stair (2018). The Constantinian Order of Saint George and the Angeli, Farnese and Bourbon families which governed it. Boletín Oficial del Estado. ISBN 978-8-4340-2506-6.
