= Ivan Crnojević =

- Crnjoević depicted in The Miracle of St. Tryphon by the workshop of Vittore Carpaccio, c. 1506

Lord of Zeta
- Reign: 1465–1490
- Predecessor: Stefan Crnojević
- Successor: Đurađ IV Crnojević
- Died: 1490; Cetinje, Lordship of Zeta (today Montenegro)
- Burial: originally Old Cetinje Monastery (today Court Church in Ćipur)
- Spouses: Voisava Arianiti; Mara Vukčić Kosača
- Issue: Đurađ; Stefan; Staniša; Ana
- House: Crnojević
- Father: Stefan Crnojević
- Mother: Mara Kastrioti
- Religion: Serbian Orthodox Christianity
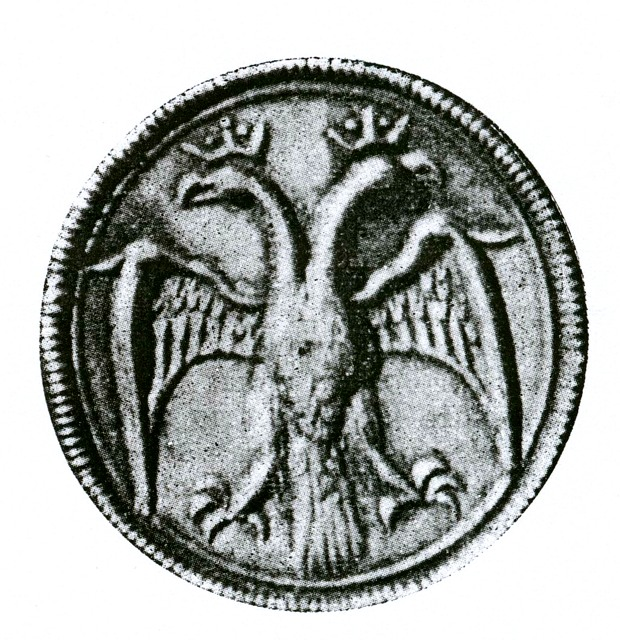
- Seal

Ivan Crnojević (Serbian Cyrillic: Иван Црнојевић, lit. 'Ivan the Black') was the Lord of Zeta from 1465 to 1490. Sources refer to him as a Montenegrin-Serbian leader. Having formed an alliance with the Republic of Venice, he led the resistance against the expanding Ottoman Empire He was successful at first but lost his realm in 1479. He resumed power in 1481 in Žabljak and soon founded Cetinje as the new capital of his state.

== Early life ==
Ivan Crnojević was a member of the Crnojević noble family whose ancestry dates back from Serbian nobleman Đuraš Ilijić. He was born to Stefan Crnojević and Mara Kastrioti, an Albanian noblewoman of the House of Kastrioti. Ivan had two brothers, Andrija and Božidar. Ivan first married Voisava Arianiti, the daughter of Albanian lord Gjergj Arianiti, and he also became related with titular Serbian Despot Stefan Branković through his wife Angelina, from the same family. Ivan's second wife was Mara, a daughter of Stefan Vukčić Kosača. Ivan had four children, three sons and one daughter. Two of his sons were notable: Đurađ Crnojević and Staniša "Stanko" (Skenderbeg). When Ivan died in 1490 his son Đurađ succeeded him as the lord of Zeta until the Ottomans forced him to leave Zeta in 1496. In his youth Ivan took part in the raids against the domains of Stefan Vukčić Kosača, the duke of Saint Sava in Hum, and on one occasion (between 1442 and 1444) he was captured. While he was Herzog's hostage (not imprisoned, but in Herzog's service, to guarantee his father's loyalty) his father was unable to be completely independent from Kosača or to fully ally with Venetian Republic. Venice saw Stefan Crnojević as an important potential ally in their war against Serbian Despotate, so they tried to bring him closer by accepting his request to maintain a pressure on Kosača to release Ivan. Stefan was ready to do anything to have Ivan released from Kosača's captivity, so he complied with Venetian condition to allow them to suppress the rebellion in Grbalj. After Venetians brutally suppressed the rebellion in Grbalj they forced Kosača to reluctantly release Ivan to them and spent 120 ducats to buy him new clothes before handling him to his father.

== Reign ==
=== Lord of Zeta ===
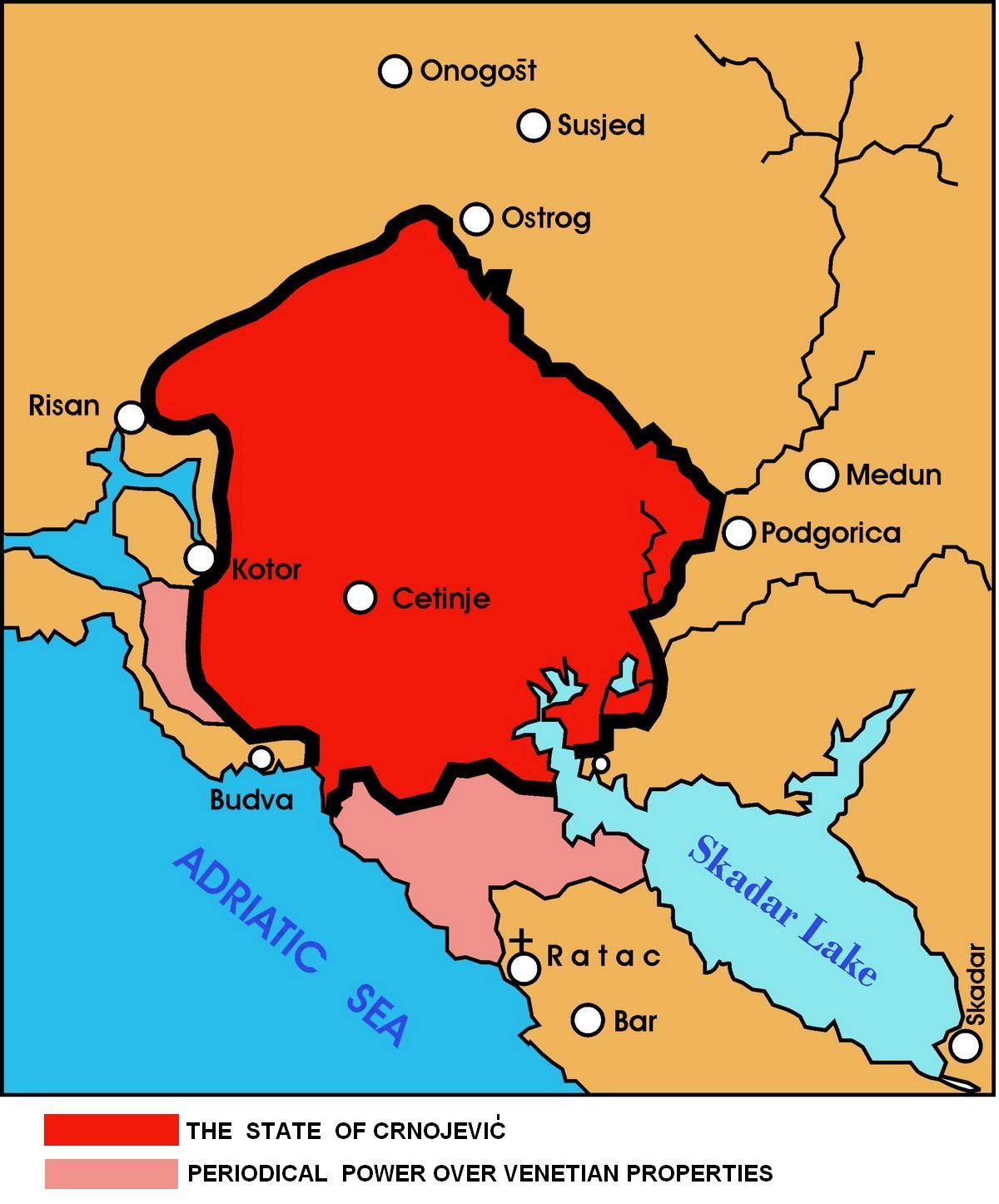
Map of the domain of Crnojević

At the beginning of his reign, Ivan had poor relations with the Republic of Venice, whom he saw as occupiers of his cities. In return, the Venetians put a price on his head in 1465. Due to the political maneuvering of Stefan Vukčić and Skanderbeg, in 1466, Ivan was made a duke with annual payment from the Venetian Republic, with his capital at Žabljak on Lake Skadar. His payment was quite fair, 1,200 ducats annually. In 1469 Ivan remarried, to Mara, the daughter of Stefan Vukčić.

Ivan Crnojević fought for the Venetians in their wars against the Ottoman Empire. The Venetian Captain of Upper Zeta and Duke was accepted thus in 1473 into the ranks of Venetian nobility. In 1474 he further honored his obligations and defended Skadar from an Ottoman attack. Ivan Crnojević had important role in the defense of the Skadar because he provided the connection with Kotor and supplied the city through Žabljak or Skadar Lake, fighting simultaneously against strong Ottoman forces. He transported men and woods from Kotor over the hills into Žabljak where he built fustas which surprised Ottomans at Skadar lake. During whole summer of 1474 Ivan Crnojević participated in military actions. He controlled the Skadar lake with three fustas and 15 smaller ships, which was very important because Venetian fleet (composed of 34 larger ships and about 100 smaller) was unable to sail further than St. Srđ. The Venetian Senate awarded Ivan with many presents and one war flag as sign of appreciation for his help during the siege.

After this success, Ivan planned to liberate Herzegovina from Ottoman occupation for his brother-in-law Duke Vladislav Hercegović. Conflicts came out over discussions regarding the future border between the realms of Zeta and Herzegovina, which allowed Sultan Mehmed II to take initiative and invade Zeta, and with Duke Stephen's help the Turks seized Ivan's throne of Žabljak in 1478. In 1477 Ottomans captured most of the territory of Zeta together with Žabljak and defeated main army of Ivan Crnojević late in 1477 or early 1478. Ivan moved to Obod (fortified by him in 1475) which was soon renamed to Rijeka Crnojevića and became a new capitol of his state.

Ottomans then concentrated their forces at Venetian held Skadar. They besieged it in May 1478. Ivan's forces, with Ragusan support, sailed over the lake and attacked Ottoman tents at night.

Venice ended sixteen-year war with Ottomans by signing the peace treaty with Ottomans. That way Venice sacrificed its ally Ivan Crnojević who was not included into the peace treaty and had to leave his Zeta and find a haven in Italy.

=== Return to Zeta ===
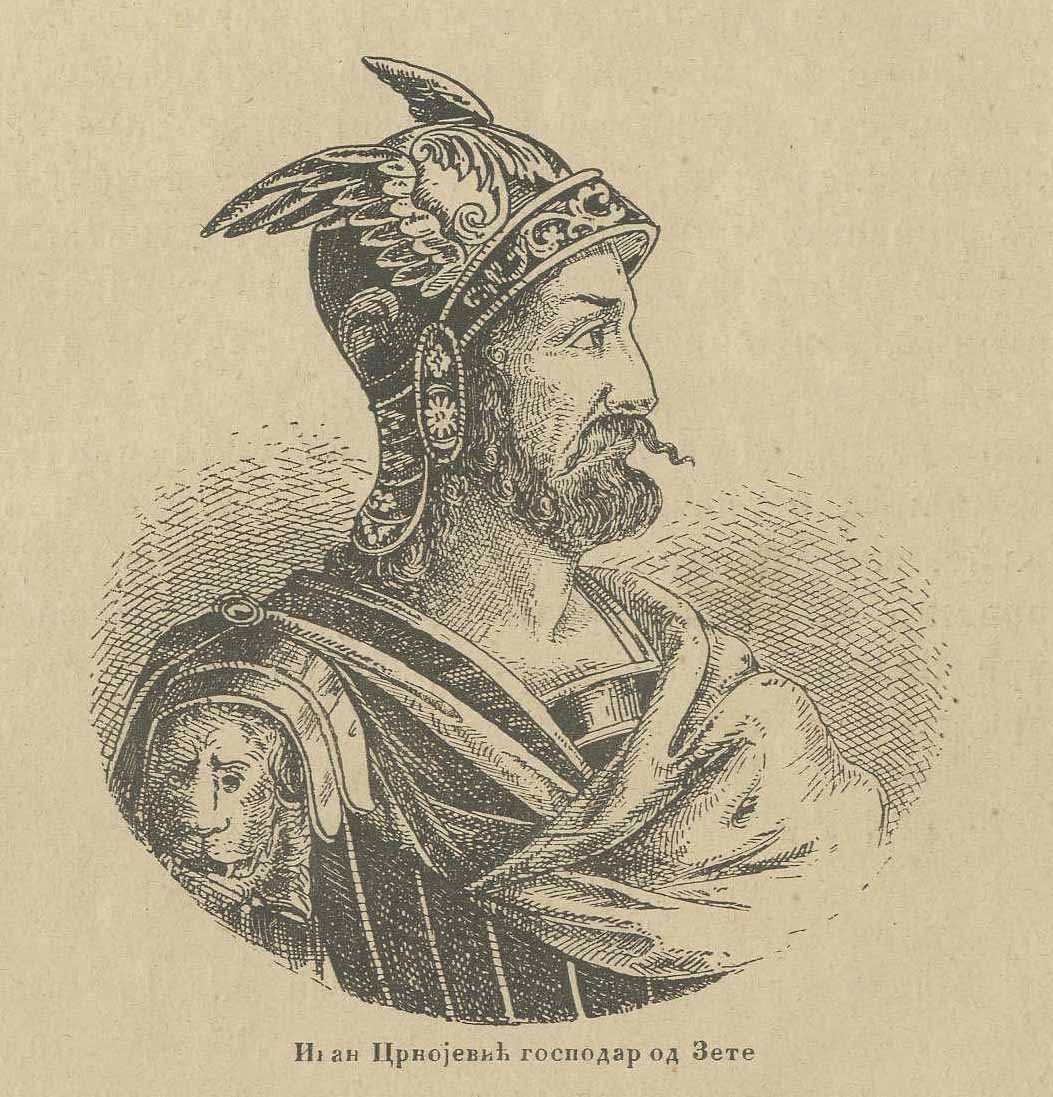
Ivan Crnojević, an 1885 illustration

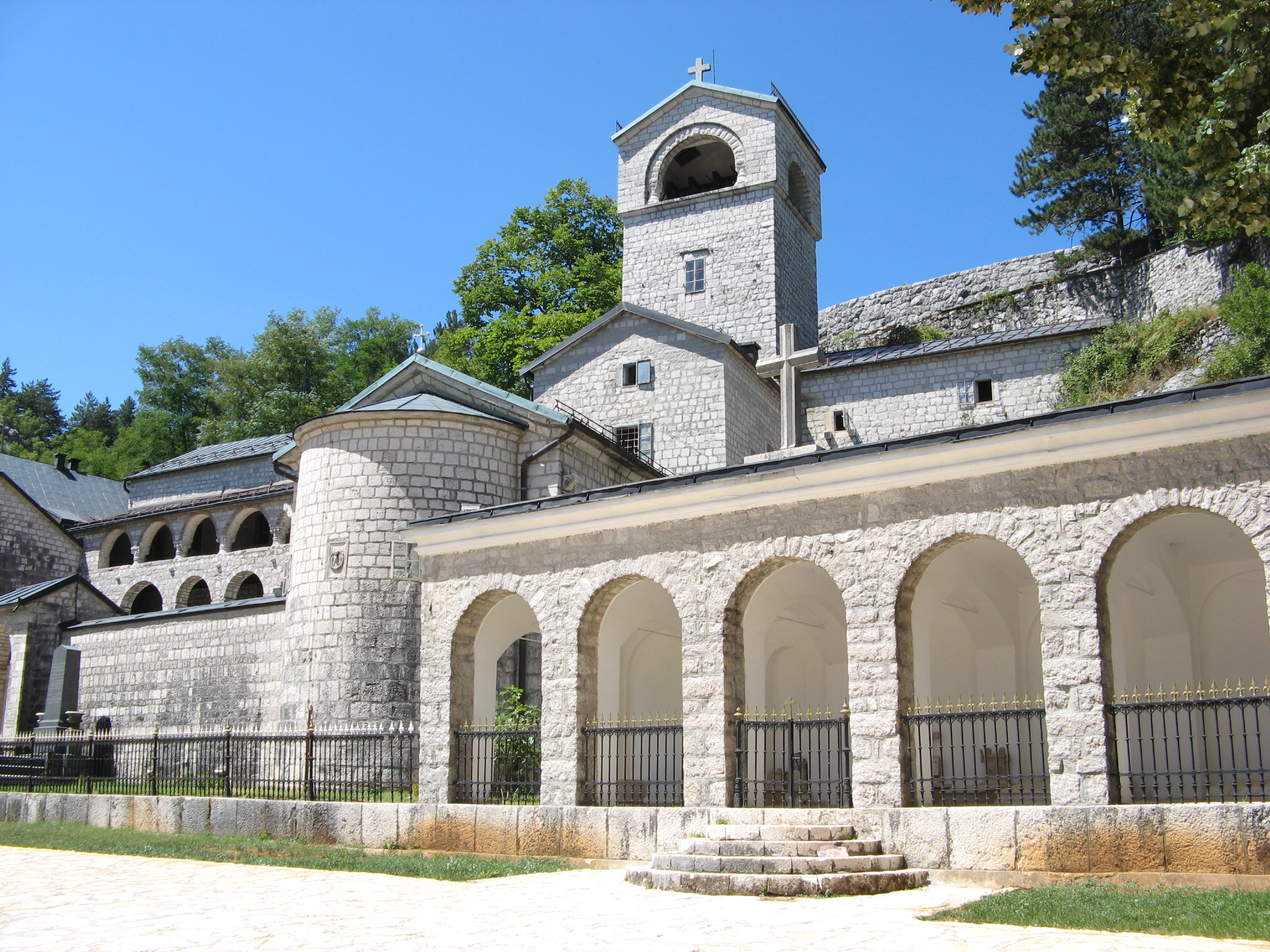
Old Cetinje Monastery; founded by Ivan

After Sultan Mehmed II's death in May 1481, Ivan Crnojević disembarked near Dubrovnik in June 1481. Using the civil war that erupted between Mehmed's sons, Bayezid II and Cem, he restored control over Zeta and Žabljak with the help of the people that welcomed him gladly as a liberator and supported by forces under Skanderbeg's son Gjon Kastrioti II.

The new Ottoman sultan Bayezid accepted Ivan as his vassal. In order to guarantee his loyalty to the Sultan, Ivan sent his youngest son Staniša and several of his friends to the sultan's court in 1482.

The center of his renewed realm was at Obod above the Crnojević River. Wishing to preserve the realm of Zeta and its independence from the Ottomans because he didn't feel safe at the edge and the border, Ivan moved its capital deeper into the hills to a more easily defended location in the field of Cetinje at the foot of Mount Lovćen. He had his court built in 1482 and the monastery of the Mother of Christ in Cetinje as a personal endowment to the Serbian Orthodox Church in 1484, thus founding Cetinje as a town. His court and the monastery are the first recorded renessaince buildings in Montenegro. He also moved the seat of the Metropolitanate of Zeta to the Old Cetinje Monastery, where he was buried upon his death in 1490.

== Legacy ==
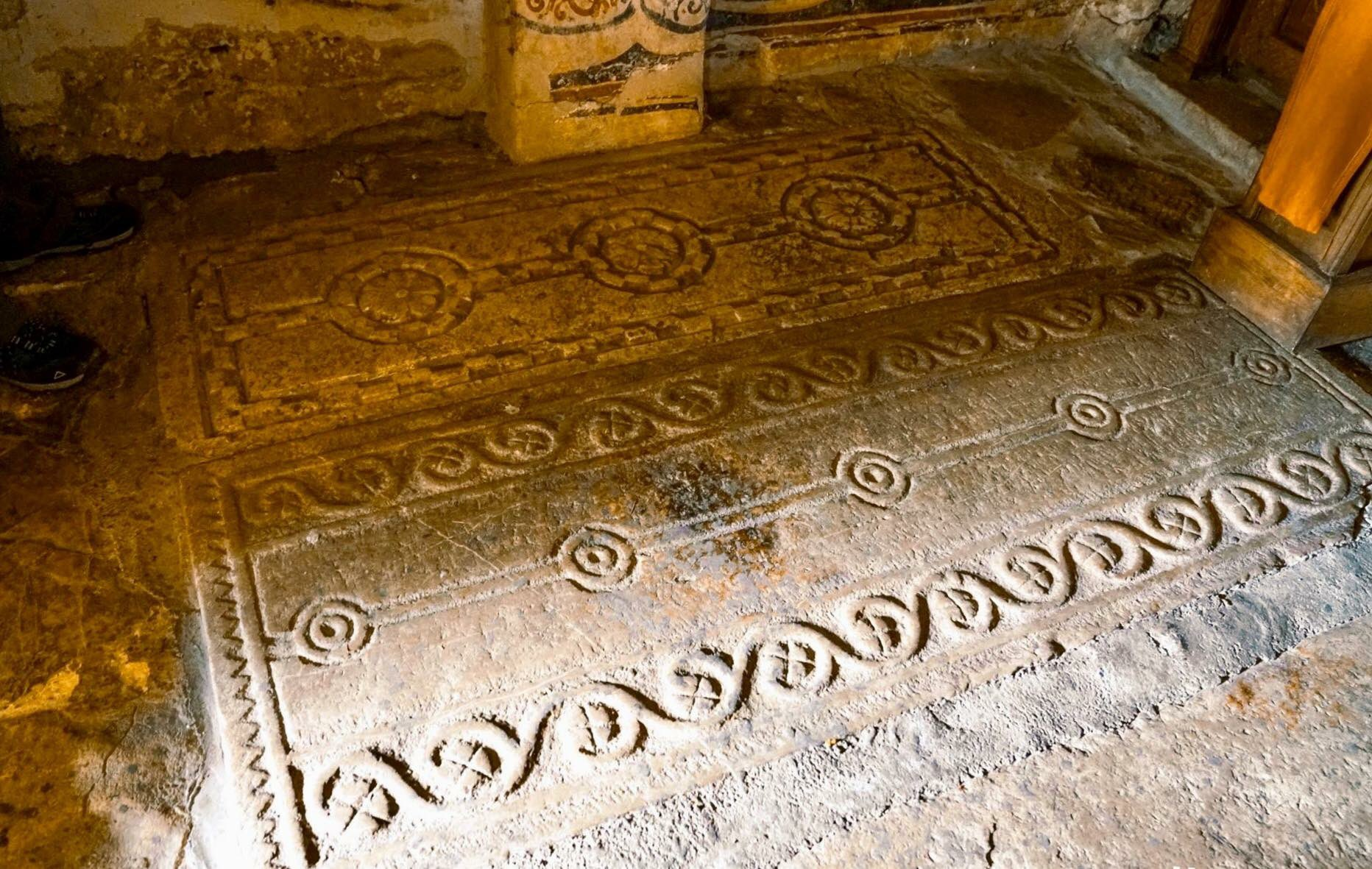
Ivan commissioned the carving of intricate Gothic headstones for his parents at Kom.

Ivan brought a range of legislative acts that were later of great importance for the legal and cultural history of a future Montenegro. He was succeeded by his son Đurađ Crnojević, who established one of the first Cyrillic printing houses in the Balkans.

His youngest son Stanko converted to Islam and received the name Skender, hence he is also known as Skenderbeg Crnojević, and became the Ottoman sanjakbey of the Sanjak of Montenegro when it was established in 1514.

Ivan's last capital Cetinje, a town founded by him, became the capital of Prince-Bishopric of Montenegro at the end of the 17th century. The modern-day Cetinje Monastery was built between 1701 and 1704 on the site of the former Ivan's court. On the site of the monastery of the Mother of Christ built by Ivan, prince Nicholas built a new church in the 19th century, so called Court Church.

In the 20th century the church went through several major reconstructions. During one of them Ivan's grave was found and his bones were moved to the bank safe. In 2010 Montenegrin government buried the bones of Ivan Crnojević in the Court Church, in a ceremony which was closed to the public.

== Family tree ==
Ancestry of Ivan Crnojević

8. Radič Crnojević
4. Đurađ Đurašević
9. Jelena
2. Stefan Crnojević
10. Koja Zaharia
5. Busha Zaharia
11. Bosa Dukagjini
1. Ivan Crnojević
12. Pal Kastrioti
6. Gjon Kastrioti
13. Unknown
3. Mara Kastrioti
14. Domenico Muzaka
7. Voisava Kastrioti
15. Unknown

== Notes ==
1. In Serbo-Croatian, his name is spelled Ivan Crnojević (Serbo-Croatian Cyrillic: Иван Црноjeвић), which is also the spelling mostly used in English sources. He is also known as Ivanbeg Crnojević (Иванбег Црнојевић) and Ivan the Black (Ivan Crni / Иван Црни). His given name may also be rendered Jovan (Јован). In Italian, his name is rendered Giovanni Cernovichio.

== Sources ==
- Srejović, Dragoslav (1981), Istorija srpskog naroda. Knj. 1, Od najstarijih vremena do maričke bitke (1371) [History of Serbs, Book 1, From earliest times to Battle of Marica (1371)] (in Serbian), Belgrade: Srpska književna zadruga, OCLC 456125379
- "Ivan Crnojević - najznačajnija ličnost crnogorske istorije" (text in Montenegrin language)
- Kovijanić, Risto (1963). Crnogorska plemena u kotorskim spomenicima (XIV–XVI vijek) [Montenegrin tribes in Bay of Kotor records (XIV–XVI century)]. Titograd: Istorijski institut SR Crne Gore.
- Veselinović, Andrija; Ljušić, Radoš (2008). Srpske dinastije (in Serbian). Službeni glasnik. ISBN 978-86-7549-921-3.
- Erdeljan, Jovana (2021). Eclecticism in Late Medieval Visual Culture at the Crossroads of the Latin, Greek, and Slavic Traditions. De Gryuter. p. 46. ISBN 978-3-11-069561-8.

== Regnal titles ==
Ivan Crnojević Crnojević family Born: unknown Died: 1490
Regnal titles
Preceded by Stefan	Lord of Zeta; 1465–1490	Succeeded by Đurađ
