= Zeta under the Crnojevići =

Serbian state, from 1451 to 1496

Zeta Зета (Serbian)
- 1451–1496
- Flag Coat of arms

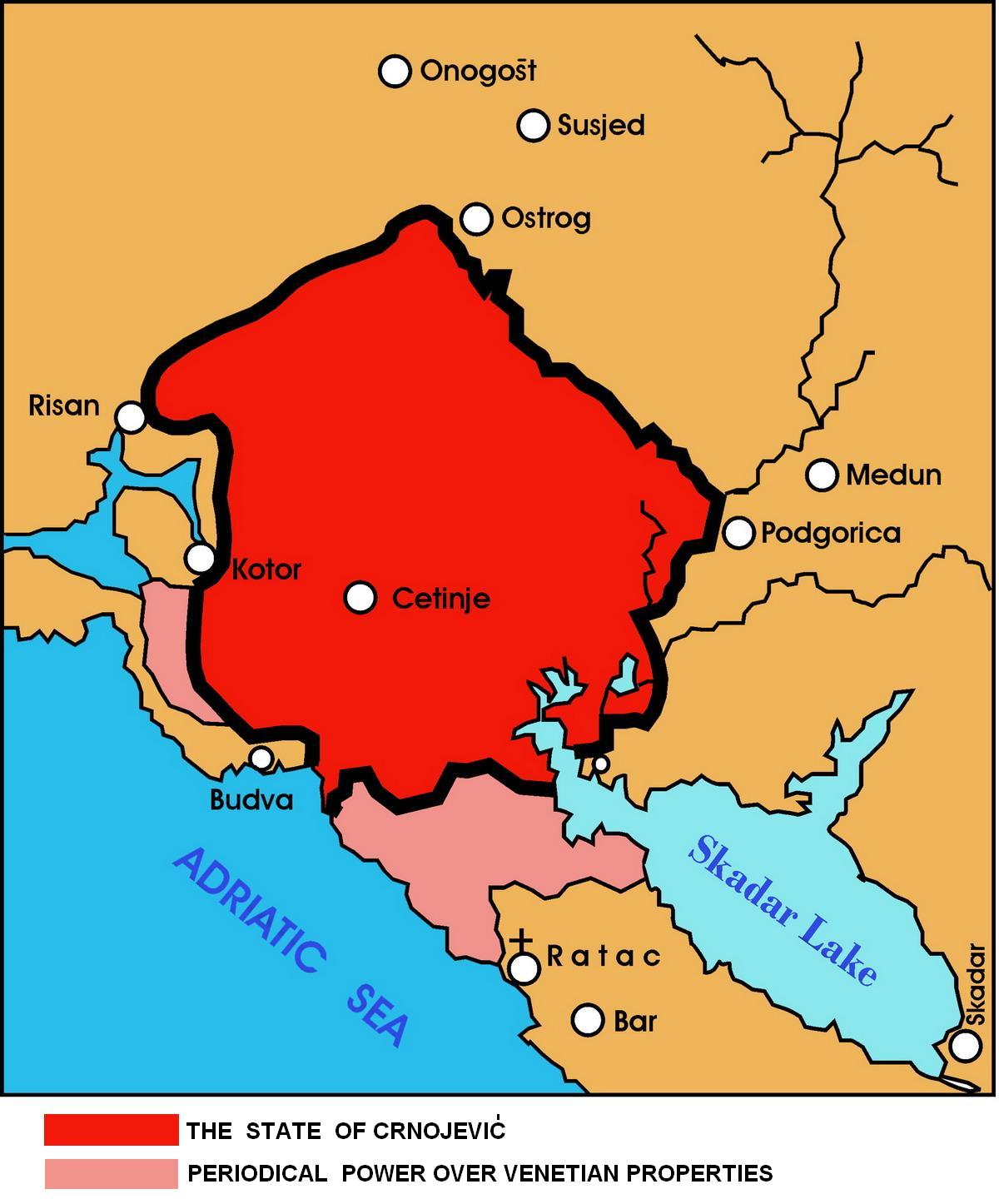
- Zeta after the war against the Ottomans
- Capital: Cetinje
- Common languages: Old Serbian (Old Slavic)
- Religion: Orthodox Christianity
- Government: Absolute monarchy
- Historical era: Medieval
  - Established: 1451
  - Disestablished: 1496
Preceded by	Succeeded by
Serbian Despotate; Zeta under the Balšići	Prince-Bishopric of Montenegro; Sanjak of Scutari
- Today part of: Montenegro; Albania

Zeta (Serbian Cyrillic: Зета) was one of the Serbian medieval polities that existed between 1371 and 1496, whose territory encompassed parts of present-day Montenegro and northern Albania. The Crnojević noble family ruled the Principality of Zeta from 1451 until 1496.

== Background ==
In 1421, before his death and under the influence of his mother Jelena, Balša III passed the rule of Zeta to Serbian Despot Stefan Lazarević. Despot Stefan fought the Republic of Venice and regained Bar in mid-1423, and in 1424 his nephew Đurađ Branković regained Drivast and Ulcinj. With the death of Despot Stefan in 1427, his nephew Đurađ inherited the rule of Serbia.

== History ==
=== Ascent to power ===
The most important roles in establishing this family's rule in Zeta were played by Stefan I Crnojević (1451–1465) and his son Ivan (1465–1490). Ivan's son Đurađ Crnojević (1490–1496) was the last ruler from this dynasty.

=== Stefan ===
Stefan I Crnojević consolidated his power in Zeta and ruled for 14 years, from 1451 until 1465. During his rule, he saw the Despotate completely subdued by the Ottomans soon after the death of Despot Đurađ Branković. Under Stefan Crnojević, Zeta comprised the Lovćen area around Cetinje, 51 municipalities which included the Crnojević River, the Zeta valley, and the tribes of Bjelopavlići, Pješivci, Malonšići, Piperi, Hoti, Kelmendi and others. The population of the territories controlled by Stefan was ca. 30,000, while the total population of the Zeta region (including territories under foreign rule) was ca. 80,000.

Capitalising on the weak position of Despot Đurađ, the Venetians and Herzog Stjepan Vukčić Kosača of St. Sava (the region of Herzegovina is named after him) conquered parts of his territory. Stefan I Crnojević, who had already established himself as the head of the Crnojević (around 1451) in Upper Zeta was forced to make territorial concessions. In addition, Kosača took Stefan's son Ivan as a political hostage, hoping it would force Stefan to side with him whenever needed.

Stefan married Mara, a daughter of a prominent Albanian Gjon Kastrioti, whose son was the Albanian national hero, Skanderbeg. In 1455, Stefan entered into an agreement with his ally Venice, stipulating that Zeta would recognize the nominal supremacy of Venice while maintaining its factual independence in virtually every respect. The agreement also stipulated that Zeta would assist Venice militarily on specific occasions in exchange for an annual provision. But in all other respects, Stefan's rule in Zeta was undisputed.

=== Ivan ===
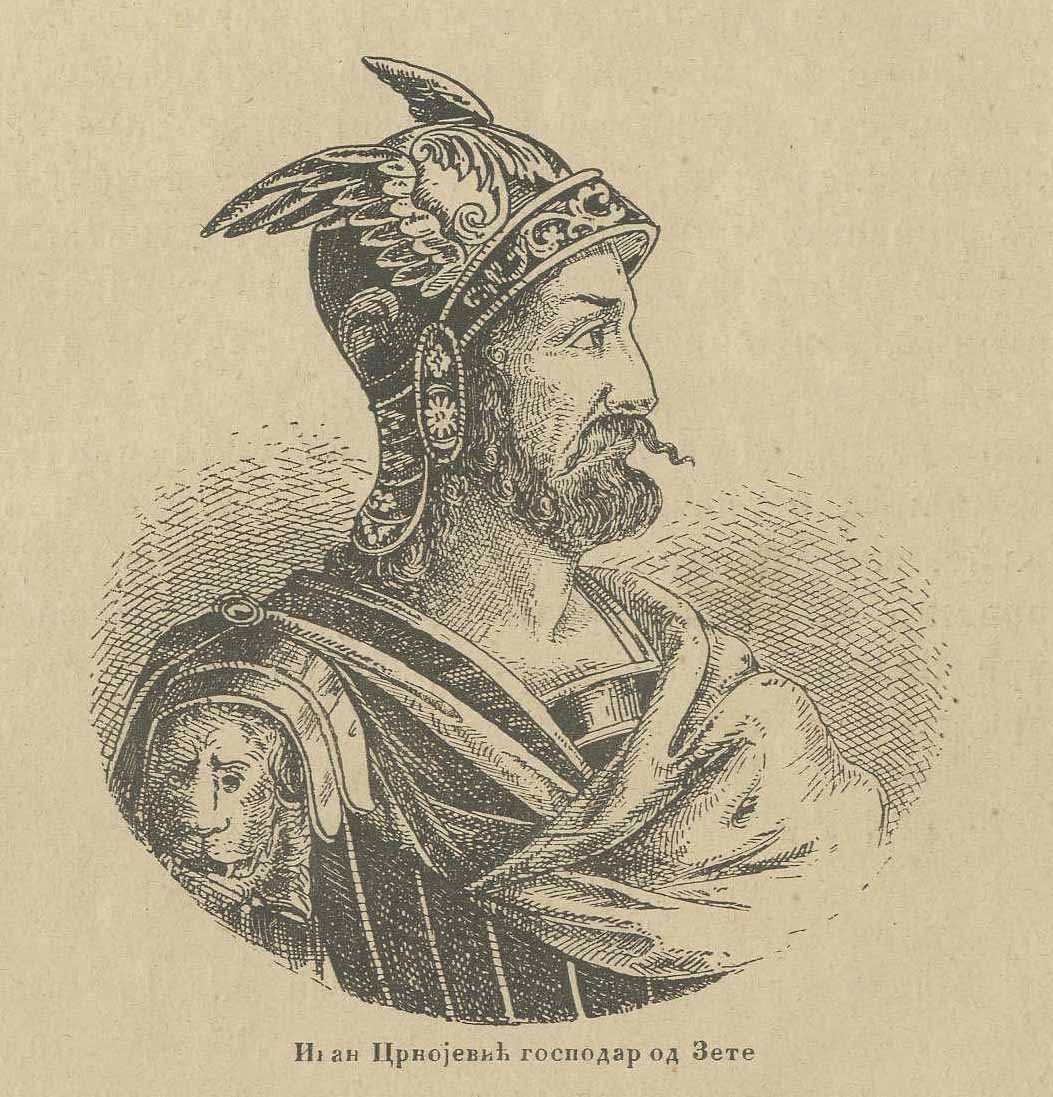
Ivan Crnojević, an 1885 illustration

Ivan Crnojević became ruler of Zeta in 1465. His rule lasted until 1490. Immediately after taking the throne, Ivan attacked Venice, breaking the alliance his father had forged. He fought Venice in an attempt to capture Kotor. He had some success, gaining increasing support from the coastal Slavic tribes of Grbalj and Paštrovići in his quest to assert control over the Bay of Kotor. But when the Ottoman campaign in northern Albania and Bosnia convinced him that the main source of danger to his country was to the East, he sought a compromise with Venice. Ivan fought numerous battles against the Turks.

Zeta and Venice fought against the Ottoman Empire. The war ended with the successful defense of Shkodra, where Venetian, Shkodran, and Zetan defenders fought off forces against Turkish Sultan Mehmed II and eventually won the war in 1474. However, the Ottomans besieged Shkodra again in 1478, with Mehmed II coming personally to lead that siege. After the Ottomans failed to take Shkodra by direct force, they assaulted Žabljak and took it without resistance. Venice ceded Shkodra to the sultan in 1479 in Treaty of Constantinople. Ivan had aspirations to organise an anti-Turkish alliance consisting of Neapolitan, Venetian, Hungarian, and Zetan forces. However, his dream could not be fulfilled since the Venetians did not dare to help Ivan after their peace treaty with the Ottoman Empire in 1479. Left on his own, Ivan managed to preserve Zeta from frequent Ottoman offensives.

Knowing that the Ottomans would try to punish him for fighting on the Venetian side, and to preserve his independence, in 1482 he moved his capital from Žabljak on Lake Skadar to the mountainous area of Dolac, under Mount Lovćen. There he built the Orthodox Cetinje Monastery, around which the capital, Cetinje, would emerge.

=== Đurađ IV ===
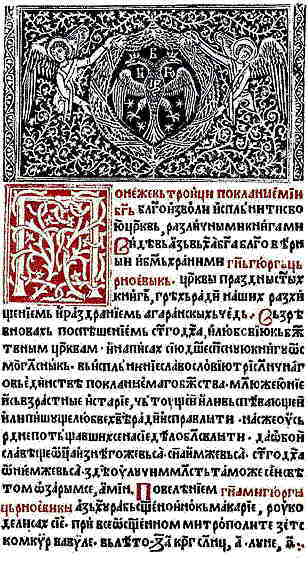
Oktoih from Cetinje

Đurađ IV Crnojević became ruler of Zeta in 1490. His rule lasted until 1496. Đurađ, Ivan's oldest son, was an educated ruler. He is most famous for one historical act: he used the printing press brought to Cetinje by his father to print the first books in southeastern Europe, in 1493. The Crnojević printing press marked the beginning of the printed word among South Slavs. The press operated from 1493 through 1496, turning out religious books, five of which have been preserved: Oktoih prvoglasnik, Oktoih petoglasnik, Psaltir, Molitvenik, and Četvorojevanđelje. Đurađ managed the printing of the books, wrote prefaces and afterwords, and developed sophisticated tables of Psalms with the lunar calendar. The books from the Crnojević press were printed in two colors, red and black, and were richly ornamented. They served as models for many books printed in Cyrillic.

After the rule of Zeta was handed to Đurađ, his youngest brother, Staniša, with no chance to succeed his father, Ivan, went to Constantinople and converted to Islam, receiving the name of Skender. As a loyal servant of the Sultan, Staniša became the Sanjak-bey of Shkodra. His brothers, Đurađ and Stefan II, continued the struggle against the Ottomans. The historical facts are unclear and disputed, but it seems that the Venetians, frustrated by their inability to subdue the House of Crnojević to their interests, managed to kill Stefan II and deceitfully sent Đurađ to Constantinople. Principally, Đurađ visited Venice to work on the wide anti-Ottoman campaign but was kept in captivity for some time while Stefan II was defending Zeta against the Ottomans. It is likely that upon his return to Zeta, Đurađ was kidnapped by the Venetian agents and sent to Constantinople under the accusation that he had been organizing a Holy War against Islam. There are some unreliable claims that Đurađ was given Anatolia to rule, but in any case, the reports about Đurađ's whereabouts ceased after 1503.

== Aftermath ==
After the death of Đurađ Crnojević, Zeta was ruled by his brother Stefan II, an Ottoman vassal. This marked the beginning of the end of the Crnojević family as rulers of Zeta. Zeta was administratively part of the Sanjak of Scutari from 1499 to 1514. During this period, while Brda and North-West of Montenegro were nominally independent, the part of Zeta under Mount Lovćen remained entirely independent. By the end of the 15th century, Upper Zeta comprised the nahije of Katun, Rijeka, Crmnica, and Lješ. In 1514, the Sanjak of Montenegro was established by order of Sultan Bayezid II; it was a separate sanjak with parts that were previously in the Sanjak of Scutari. Ivan Crnojević's son Staniša converted to Islam and became "Skenderbeg" and was chosen as the first sanjakbey and governed the sanjak until 1528. Despite Skenderbeg's emphasized cruelty, Ottomans did not have real power in Zeta. The real power was in the hands of tribal heads. From 1534 onwards, there is no more mention of the Crnojevićs in Zeta. They reappeared in history as Čarnojevićs; the most prominent member was Arsenije III Čarnojević (1633–1706).

Zeta was turned into a theocratic state by the Metropolitans of Zeta in 1516 when the last of the Crnojevićs ceded power to the bishop of Cetinje and retired to live in Venice. In Zeta, the position of the Metropolitan (vladika, or prince-bishop) substituted leadership of Zeta, and brought stability. The link between church and state elevated it in the eyes of the peasantry, gave it an institutionalized form of succession that prevented its becoming a matter of contest between minor chieftains, and excluded the possibility of compromising alliances with the Ottomans. Upper Zeta later became known as "Montenegro" (meaning black mountain) because the mountain realm, though isolated, was visible to Venetian-speaking merchants and seamen operating out of the ports of Cattaro and Ragusa on the Dalmatian coast. Indeed, access to the region was only possible by way of the perilous Steps of Cattaro that twist their way steeply into the dark, forbidding mountains above the town. The Ottomans had controlled a part of Zeta since 1498, that was known as the Sanjak of Montenegro, the Republic of Venice controlled the Bay of Cattaro and the Vladikas of Montenegro controlled the rest.
