= Palazzo Grandiben Negri, Venice =

Coordinates: 45°26′04″N 12°20′55″E

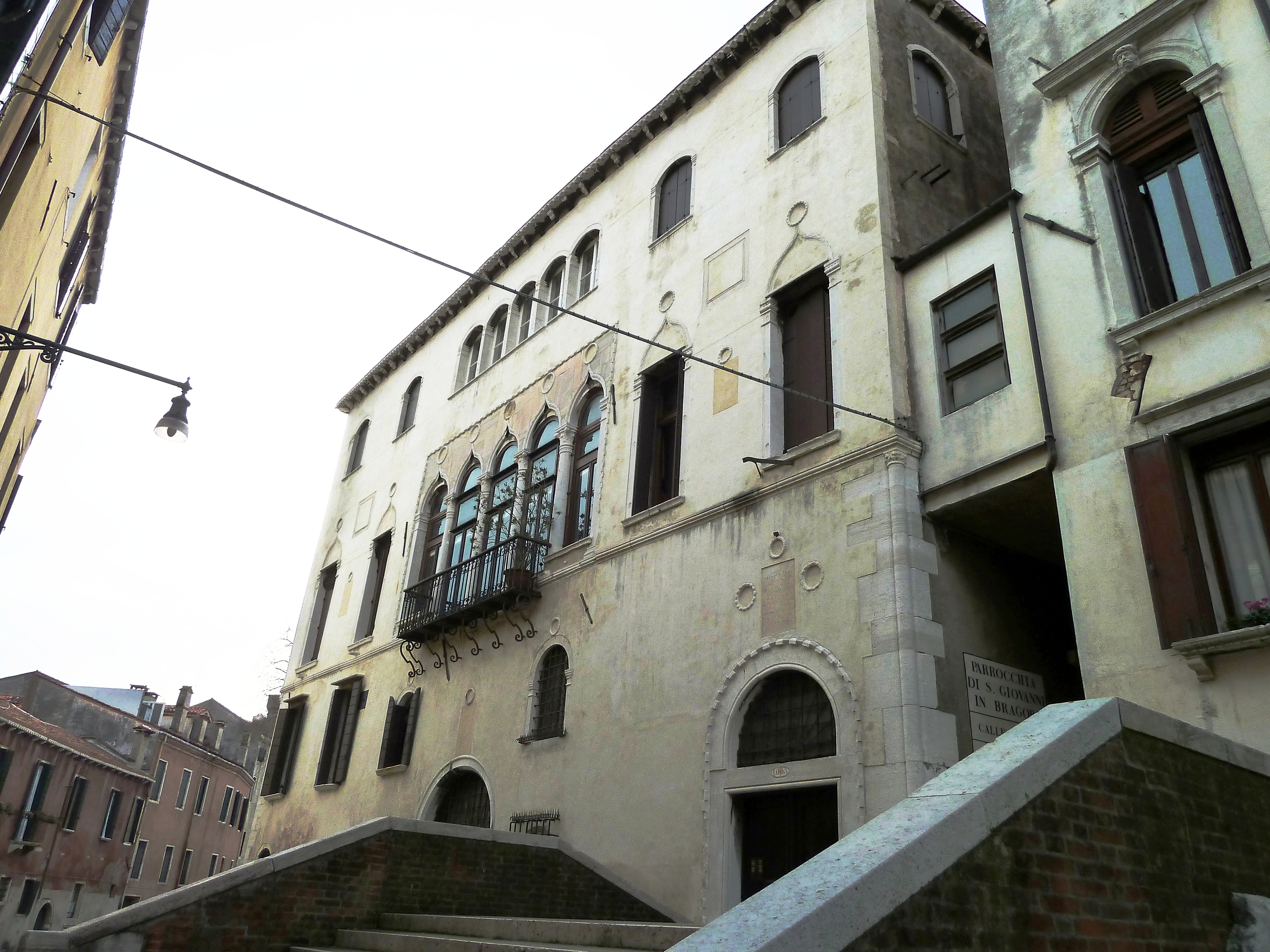
Palazzo Grandiben Negri

The Palazzo Grandiben Negri is a small brick palace located facing the Rio of Ca' di Dio, adjacent to the larger Palazzo Erizzo, and diagonally across the rear of the church of San Martino in the sestiere of Castello in Venice, Italy.

== History ==
The palace was commissioned by Nicolò Grandiben of citizen (it:Cittadini (Venezia) ) Grandiben family. A son of a 15th-century merchant, Melchiorre Grandiben, Nicolò, was ducal secretary. In 1478 he traveled to Brescia, to request that Lorenzo Zane, Patriarch of Antioch and Bishop of Brescia, who had revealed political secrets to the Pope, appear before the council and explain himself.

Nicolò Grandiben, in his will of August 8, 1490, left to his son Girolamo (also ducal secretary), the house and contents, except for part of the well with columns and marble table, were endowed for the church of San Martino for construction of a baptistery in memory of the family. This baptistery was once found in a chapel of the former church of San Daniele in Venice (destroyed 1839). In 1630, Diana Grandiben, daughter of Girolamo Gradinben, left the palace to her sister, Agnesina married to Marcantonio Negri. The Negri family owned the palace into at least the late 18th-century, since Francesco Negri, a prominent writer (1769-1827) was born here. It is now houses a rental property.
