= Firuz Bey =

16th-century Ottoman military officer

Feriz Beg
- Born: mid-15th century
- Died: after 1515
- Military career
- Allegiance: Ottoman Empire
- Commands: Sanjak-bey of the Sanjak of Bosnia (1495–96); Sanjak-bey of the Sanjak of Scutari (1496–1502); Sanjak-bey of the Sanjak of Bosnia (1504–12)
- Conflicts: 1496 — attack on Zeta; 1497 — Capture of Grbalj; Ottoman–Venetian War (1499–1503); 1499 — raids of Dalmatia; 1499 — raids of Durazzo region; 1501 — Capture of Durazzo

Feriz Beg (fl. 1495–1515) was a 15th and 16th-century Ottoman military officer, Sanjak-bey of the Sanjak of Scutari and Sanjak of Bosnia.

== Origin ==
Feriz Beg belonged to the Mihaloğlu family, a noted Byzantine family which converted to Islam and was important in the early Ottoman conquests of the Balkans.

== Career ==
=== Bosnia ===
From 1495 to 1496, Feriz was sanjak-beg of the Sanjak of Bosnia. His predecessor Jahja Pasha built a mosque in Sarajevo during his reign in Bosnia (1494–95) but did not provide a water supply to it. According to a legend, he asked his successor, Firuz Bey to do so from Sedrenik to the Jahja Pasha mosque. Firuz Bey did so and also built a public tap in honour of his predecessor.

=== Scutari ===
Feriz Beg held the position of Sanjak-bey of the Sanjak of Scutari from 1496 to 1502. Đurađ Crnojević who controlled the neighboring Principality of Zeta maintained frequent correspondence with other Christian feudal states with the intention of establishing an anti-Ottoman coalition. When his brother Stefan betrayed him to the Ottomans in 1496, Đurađ proposed to accept the suzerainty of the Ottoman Empire and Firuz Bey if they allowed him to remain as governor in Zeta. Firuz Bey refused this proposal and invited Đurađ to either come to Scutari to clarify his anti-Ottoman activities or to flee Zeta. When Firuz Bey attacked Zeta with strong forces in 1496 Đurađ was forced to flee to Venice. In 1497, Firuz Bey captured Grbalj and put Zeta under his effective military control, although it was still part of the Zeta governed by Stefan Crnojević. In 1499, Firuz Bey formally annexed Zeta to the territory of Sanjak of Scutari, after he became suspicious of Stefan because of his connections with Venice. Firuz Bey invited Stefan Crnojević to Skadar where he imprisoned him. It is thought that Stefan probably died in prison since he was never mentioned again in historical sources. In 1499, Firuz Bey organized raids of the territory around Durazzo. It was poorly defended and its population would have surrendered if Firuz Bey had brought more forces. During the same year Firuz Bey joined Isa Pasha and raided the inland of Dalmatia. In 1501, Firuz Bey captured Durazzo. After the Ottoman–Venetian War (1499–1503), Firuz Bey became the Ottoman representative for the region of Cattaro.

=== Bosnia ===
After the death of Skender Pasha in November 1504, Firuz Bey became Sanjak-bey of the Sanjak of Bosnia again. The first mention of the name of the city Sarajevo was in a 1507 letter written by Firuz Bey. In 1509, he built a hammam (Bosnian: Ćifte hamam) in Sarajevo and several shops around it as its vakif. He also built a mekteb (elementary school) and madrasa before 1515. This was the oldest madrasa in Sarajevo and one of the oldest in Bosnia. In 1528, the neighborhood of this madrasa developed into a mahala named Mahala of Firuz Beg's Madrasa (Bosnian: Mahala Firuz-begove medrese).

== Legacy ==
Until 1945, one street in Sarajevo was named after Feriz Beg. After Bosnia and Herzegovina seceded from Yugoslavia in 1992, one street is again named after Firuz Bey. His madrasa was destroyed at the end of the 17th century by the army of Eugene of Savoy. His hammam was operational until 1810 when it was closed down by Ottoman authorities because of the poor state of its roof. The building slowly deteriorated and was almost completely destroyed right before the First World War. The site and remains of this hammam are defined as a National Monument of Bosnia and Herzegovina since 2008.

== Annotations ==
He is known as "Firuz Bey" (Bosnian: Firuz-beg) and "Feriz Bey" (Bosnian: Feriz-beg). In Bosnian he is also called Firuz Mihajlović.

== Sources ==
- Goodwin, Godfrey (2 January 2013). The Janissaries. Saqi Essentials. ISBN 978-0-86356-781-0.
- Preto, Paolo (January 2010). I servizi segreti di Venezia. Spionaggio e controspionaggio ai tempi della Serenissima. Il Saggiatore. ISBN 978-88-565-0164-3.
- Sarajevu, Gazi Husrevbegova biblioteka u (2007). Anali Gazi Husrev-begove biblioteke. Gazi Husrev-begova biblioteka.
- Tanzer, Kim; Longoria, Rafael (11 April 2007). The Green Braid: Towards an Architecture of Ecology, Economy and Equity. Routledge. ISBN 978-1-134-12058-1.
- Ћоровић, Владимир; Петровић, Драгољуб С (2006). Историја Срба. Дом и школа. ISBN 9788683751303.
- Kasumović, Ismet (1999). Školstvo i obrazovanje u Bosanskom ejaletu za vrijeme osmanske uprave. Islamski kulturni centar. ISBN 9789958804069.
- Bojović, Boško I. (1998). Raguse (Dubrovnik) et l'Empire ottoman (1430–1520): les actes impériaux ottomans en vieux-serbe de Murad II à Sélim Ier. Eds. de l&Association "Pierre Belon". ISBN 978-2-910860-06-6.
- Alić, Džemaludin; Ćeman, Mustafa (1998). Devetnaest stoljeća Bosne: historija i kultura Bosne od 6. do 1900. godine. Dinex. ISBN 9789958972300.
- Rizaj, Skënder (1982). Kosova gjatë shekujve XV, XVI dhe XVII: administrimi, ekonomia, shoqëria dhe lëvizja popullore. Rilindja.
- Pavle S. Radusinović (1978). Stanovništvo Crne Gore do 1945. godine: opšta istorijsko-geografska i demografska razmatranja. Srpska akademija nauka i umetnosti.
- Bejtić, Alija (1973). Streets and squares of Sarajewo. Muzej grada Sarajeva.
- Марковић, Томаш (1969). Историја школства и просвјете у Црној Гори. Завод за издавање уџбеника Социјалистичке Републике Србије.
- umetnosti, Srpska akademija nauka i (1965). Posebna izdanja.
- Plavšić, Lazar (1959). Srpske štamparije: od kraja XV do sredine XIX veka. Udruženje grafičkih preduzeća Jugoslavije.
- Elezović (1953). Spomenik.
- Press, Illinois (1948). Illinois Studies in the Social Sciences. University of Illinois Press.
- Jovanović, Jagoš (1947). Stvaranje Crnogorske države i razvoj Crnogorske nacionalnosti: istorija Crne Gore od početka VIII vjeka do 1918 godine. Obod.
- društvo, Cetinjsko istorijsko (1935). Zapisi; Glasnik cetinjskog istorijskog društva.
- Jireček, Konstantin (1923). Istorija Srba. Izdavačka knjižarnica G. Kona.

Preceded by Yahja Pasha	Sanjak-bey of the Sanjak of Bosnia; 1495–1496	Succeeded by Skender Pasha
Preceded by unknown	Sanjak-bey of the Sanjak of Scutari; 1496—1502	Succeeded by unknown
Preceded by Skender Pasha	Sanjak-bey of the Sanjak of Bosnia; 1504–1512	Succeeded by Hadım Sinan Pasha
