= Stefan II Crnojević =

- Lord of Zeta
- Coat of arms
- Reign: 1496–1499
- Predecessor: Đurađ Crnojević
- Successor: post abolished
- Born: 1469
- Died: 1499; Scutari, Sanjak of Scutari, Ottoman Empire (modern day Albania)
- Noble family: Crnojević
- Spouse: unknown noblewoman
- Issue: Ivan (Giovanni) II Crnojević
- Father: Ivan Crnojević
- Mother: Voisava Arianiti

Stefan Crnojević (Serbian Cyrillic: Стефан Црнојевић, 1469–1499), or Stephen II was the titular ruler of the Principality of Zeta between 1496 and 1499.

== Conspiring with Ottomans against Đurađ ==
Until 1496, the ruler of Zeta had been Stefan's older brother Đurađ Crnojević, who maintained frequent correspondence with other Christian feudal states with intention to establish an anti-Ottoman coalition. When his brother Stefan betrayed him to the Ottomans in 1496, Đurađ proposed to accept Ottoman suzerainty under Feriz Beg, if they accepted to recognize him as governor in Zeta. Feriz Beg refused the proposal and invited Đurađ to either come to Scutari to clarify his anti-Ottoman activities, or to flee Zeta. When Feriz Beg attacked Zeta with strong forces in 1496, Đurađ decided to flee to the Republic of Venice.

== Lord of Zeta ==
Stefan remained in Zeta hoping that the Ottomans would accept his suzerainty, but they only used him in order to easier gain control over his domains. Stefan was lord of Zeta only nominally, while Ottomans collected taxes from its population. In 1497 Feriz Beg captured Grbalj and put it under his effective military control, although it was still part of Zeta governed by Stefan Crnojević. In 1499 Feriz Beg formally annexed Zeta to the territory of his Sanjak of Scutari, after he became suspicious toward Stefan because of his contacts with Venice. Feriz Beg then invited Stefan Crnojević to Scutari, where he had him imprisoned. Stefan probably died in prison since he was never mentioned again in historical sources. According to some authors, after his brother had fled Zeta, Stefan was only an Ottoman spahi, who in 1499 went to Hilandar and became a monk, taking the monastic name Marko.

== Private life ==
Nothing is known of Stefan's marriage; he presumably led a quiet life. Some sources indicate that he remained unmarried, while others suggest that he had a son, Ivan (Giovanni) II, who succeeded him after his death in 1499 and held a position of vassal, largely nominal authority until 1515. Based on these sources, his son was married to the Venetian noblewoman Caterina Orio and had a son, Đurađ V (Giorgio V), who succeeded him and continued this nominal rule from 1515 to 1516. Becoming a noble of Venice, he moved to Venice in 1516 at the urging of his wife, Catarina Doria, who wished to enjoy the luxurious pleasures of Venice and made her husband dislike the harsh life in Montenegro.

== Family tree ==
Ancestry of Stefan II Crnojević

8. Đurađ Đurašević Crnojević
4. Stefan Crnojević
9. Busha Zaharia
2. Ivan Crnojević
10. Gjon Kastrioti
5. Mara Kastrioti
11. Voisava Kastrioti
1. Stefan II Crnojević
12. Komnen Arianiti
6. Gjergj Arianiti
13. Daughter of Nicholas Zaharia
3. Goisava Arianiti
14. Andrea III Muzaka
7. Maria Muzaka
15. Chiranna Zenevisi

== Sources ==
- društvo, Cetinjsko istorijsko (1935). Zapisi; Glasnik cetinjskog istorijskog društva.
- Jovanović, Jagoš (1947). Stvaranje Crnogorske države i razvoj Crnogorske nacionalnosti: istorija Crne Gore od početka VIII vjeka do 1918 godine. Obod.
- Марковић, Томаш (1969). Историја школства и просвјете у Црној Гори. Завод за издавање уџбеника Социјалистичке Републике Србије.
- Glasnik (1969). Istorijski Glasnik.
- Pavle S. Radusinović (1978). Stanovništvo Crne Gore do 1945. godine: opšta istorijsko-geografska i demografska razmatranja. Srpska akademija nauka i umetnosti.
- Gavrilović, Slavko (1981). Istorija srpskog naroda. Srpska književna zadruga.
- Kalezić, Dimitrije M. (2002). P - Š. Savremena administracija. ISBN 9788638706792.
- Lovrenović, Dubravko (2005). Fojnički grbovnik. Rabic. ISBN 9789958703584.

Stefan II Crnojević Crnojević family Born: unknown Died: 1499
Preceded by Đurađ	Lord of Zeta; 1496–1499	Succeeded by post abolished
