= Rade Turov Plamenac =

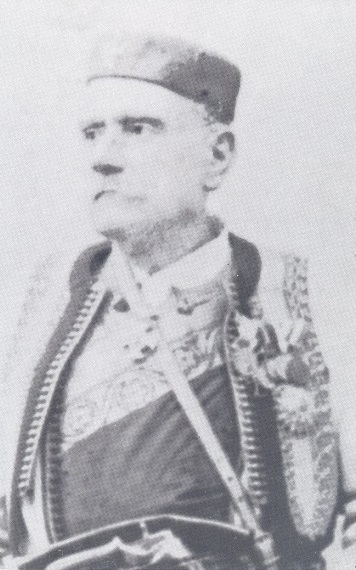
- Born: 1842; Boljevići, Prince-Bishopric of Montenegro
- Died: 1919 (aged 76–77); Boljevići, Kingdom of Serbs, Croats and Slovenes
- Occupation: Judge

Rade Turov Plamenac (Cyrillic: Раде Туров Пламенац; 1842–1919) was a Montenegrin serdar and judge. He served as judge of the Supreme Court of the Principality of Montenegro and President of the Main State Control, the court of auditors.

== Biography ==
Rade Turov Plamenac was born in the Crmnica village of Boljevići in 1842. He graduated from elementary school in Paštrovići and took up a job at the royal court in 1858.

Rade became a serdar in 1862. He fought in the Montenegrin–Ottoman War of 1876–1878.

He served as judge of the Supreme Court and President of the Main State Control, the court of auditors.

Plamenac published his memoirs Moje uspomene in 1907, as well as the brochure Crna Gora i Skenderija in 1911.

He died in Boljevići in 1919.
