= Palazzo Trevisan Cappello =

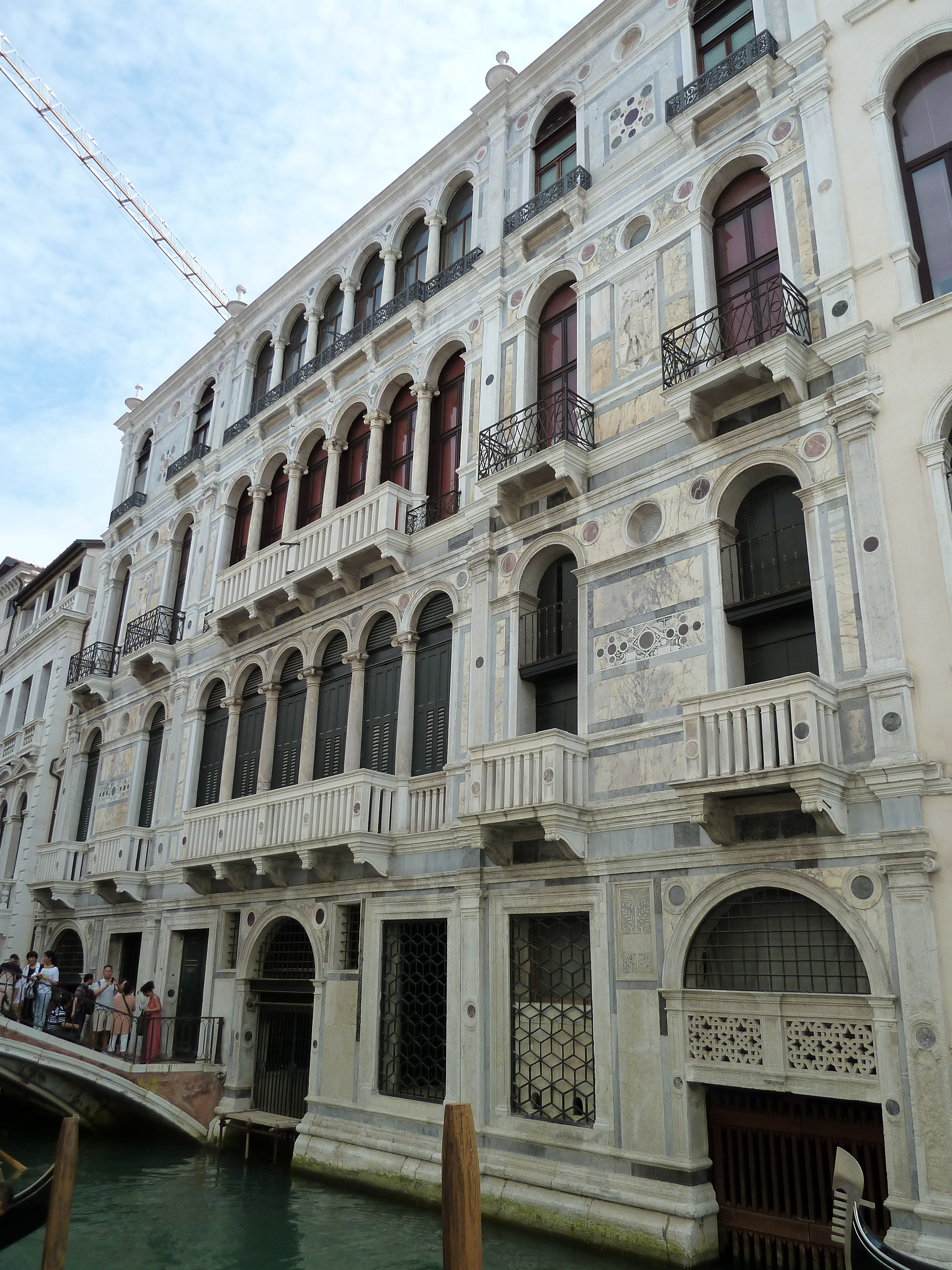
Palazzo Trevisan Cappello - Face on Rio di Palazzo

Palazzo Trevisan Cappello is a palace situated in Venice, Italy (in the sestiere of Castello) in front of Palazzo Patriarcale.

== History ==
Built in the first half of the 16th century by the Trevisan family, the palace soon became the residence of Francesco I de' Medici.

== Description ==
The façade of Trevisan Cappello is an example of Venetian Rinascimento: it has 37 windows, including three six-light windows. The ground floor has three pointed on to the canal. There are a lot of elegant marble decorations.
