= Mara Kastrioti =

15th century Albanian Princess

- Princess of Mat; Princess Consort of Zeta
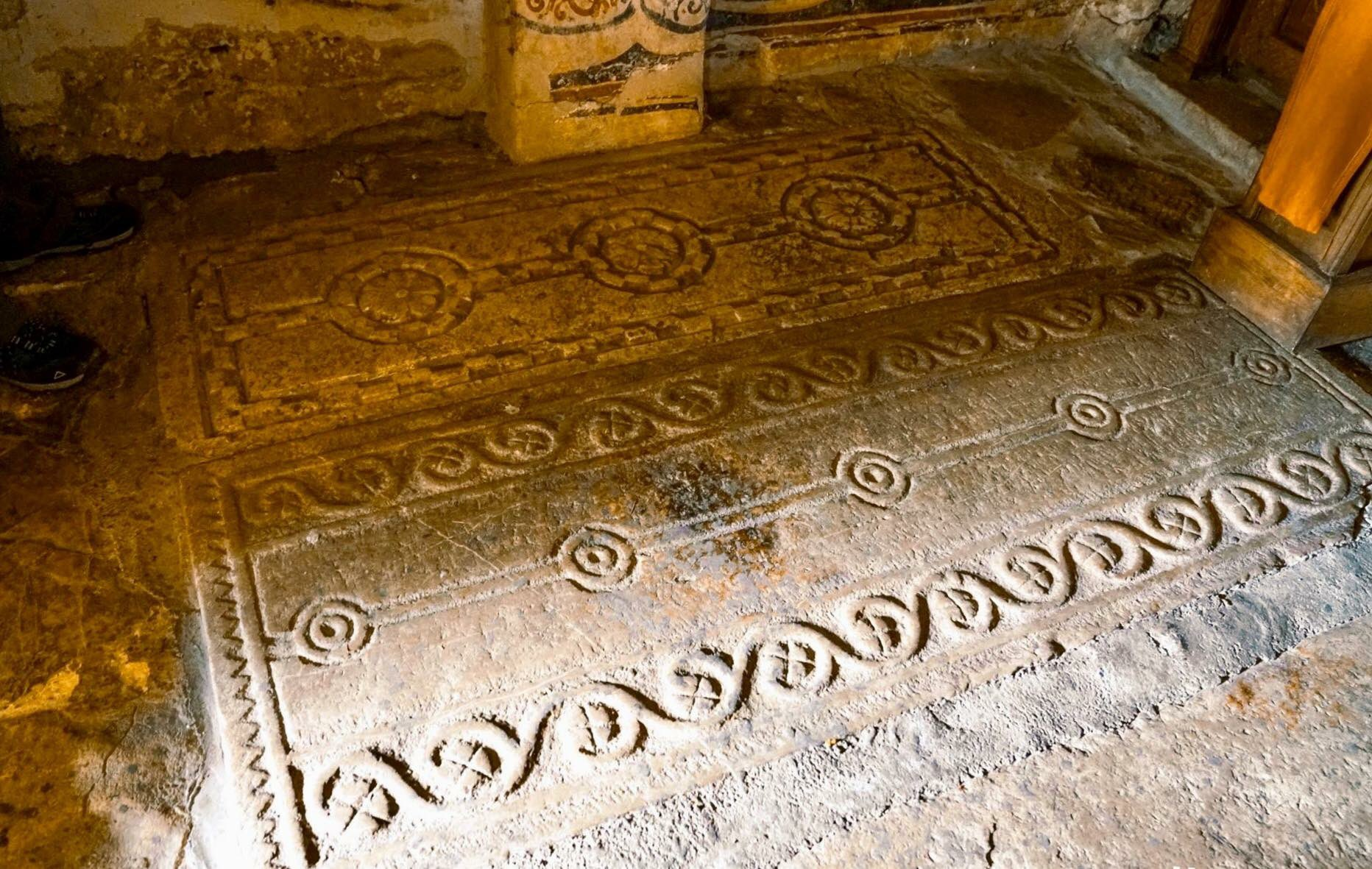
- Tombstone of Mara Kastrioti (top) and her husband Stefan Crnojević (bottom) in the Church of the Assumption of the Holy Mother of God at Kom Monastery. Mara's slab features Gothic ornamentation with three rosette-shaped flowers and a carved side border.

Princess Consort of Zeta
- Tenure: 1451–1465
- Successor: Voisava Arianiti
- Born: 15th Century; Principality of Kastrioti
- Burial: Church of the Assumption of the Holy Mother of God, Kom Monastery
- Spouse: Stefan Crnojević
- Issue: Ivan; Andrija; Božidar
- Dynasty: Kastrioti
- Father: Gjon Kastrioti
- Mother: Voisava Kastrioti

Mara Kastrioti, also known as Marija Kastrioti Crnojević, was a 15th century Albanian princess from the House of Kastrioti. She is known as the older sister of the Albanian hero Skanderbeg, and also as the wife of one ruler and the mother of another. She was married to Stefan Crnojević, who was the Lord of Zeta from 1451 until 1465. Stefan was succeeded by his son Ivan. Mara is buried in the Church of the Assumption of the Holy Mother of God at Kom Monastery.

== Life ==
Kastrioti was the daughter of the Albanian Feudal Lord Gjon Kastrioti and his wife Voisava Kastrioti, and their eldest child. Not much is known about her early life. In some documents she is referred to as Marija.

Kastrioti, whose exact year of marriage remains unknown, became the wife of Stefan Crnojević, who was the Lord of Zeta. Kastrioti and Stefan had two or three sons, Ivan, Andrija, nicknamed as the brave Albanian and Božidar. The title 'Arvanit the Brave' may have been applied to Božidar rather than Andrija, according to some sources. Božidar and Stefan may also have had a daughter, who married into the Bizanti family in the city of Kotor. Stefan ruled until 1465, when he was succeeded by their eldest son, Ivan. Kastrioti and her husband’s graves are located at the Kom Monastery, Montenegro, in the Church of the Assumption of the Holy Mother of God. This church was endowed by Đurđe and Aleksa (Lješa) Crnojević and was built between 1415 and 1427. Carved headstones for Kastrioti and Stefan were erected by Ivan, who brought coastal artisans to craft them with intricate Gothic designs but the inscriptions are worn. Kastrioti's tombstone is believed to read "This was the tombstone of Lady Mara, the Princess of the Montenegrin and sister of Đurđe Skenderbeg".

== Issue ==
Mara married Stefan Crnojević. The pair had three sons:

- Ivan
- Andrija, who is nicknamed as the brave Albanian
- Božidar

== See also ==
- House of Kastrioti
- Principality of Kastrioti
