= Palazzo Erizzo a San Martino =

Building in Venice, Italy

Coordinates: 45°26′04″N 12°20′55″E

Coat of arms of Erizzo family

The Palazzo Erizzo, also known as the Palazzo Erizzo a San Martino, is a palace located in the sestiere of Castello, adjacent to the south with the Palazzo Grandiben Negri, and across a Rio from the church of San Martino in Venice, Italy. A second Palazzo Erizzo alla Maddalena is located on the Grand Canal of Venice.

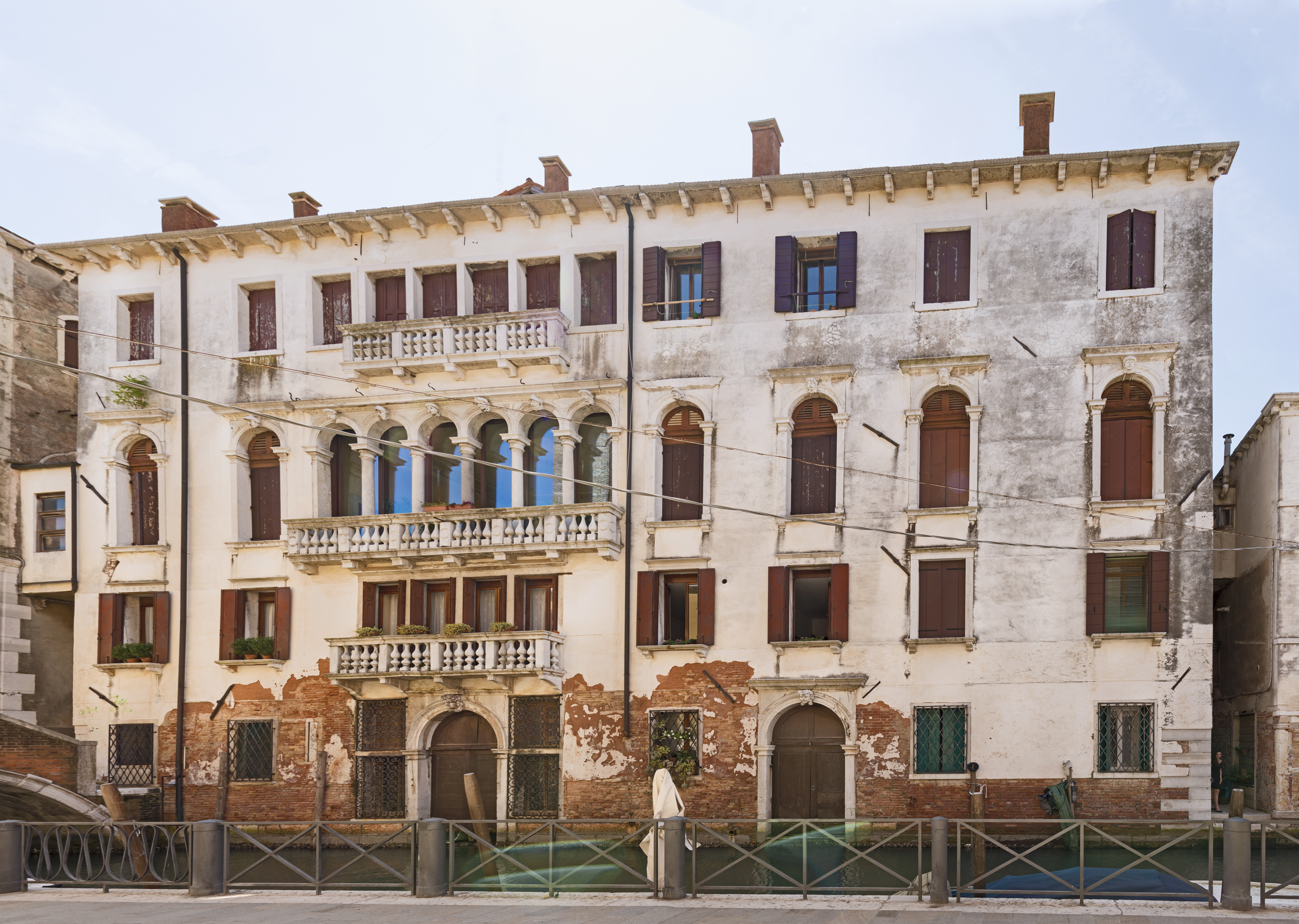
Palazzo Erizzo near Campo San Martino

== History ==
The palace originally erected by the aristorctaic Erizzo family, and was the birthplace of Francesco Erizzo, who became the Doge of Venice in 1631 till his death in 1646. An elaborate tomb for this Doge was built in the church of San Martino, whose apse stands across the Rio della Ca' en Duo. During this Doge's rule, the palace underwent some reconstruction by Baroque architect, Mattia Carneri, of the School of Longhena, but retains its more ancient, asymmetric Gothic-Byzantine decoration in the balconies and windows.

The palace remained in the Erizzo family for centuries. The brothers, Adrea and Vido Erizzo, for example, after 1780 hosted the Accademia dei Granelleschi, instituted by Daniele Farsetti in 1747, and for the first decades housed in the Palazzo Dandolo-Farsetti a San Luca.

The academy was complex, contentious, often satirical literary salon, that argued topics such as freeing Italian literature and drama from foreign, including Austrian and French influences; battles that echoed some of the conflicts between Carlo Goldoni and Carlo Gozzi. However, the meetings were not devoid of political controversies, pitting reactionary versus Enlightenment ideas. This academy, like many Venetian institutions, was extinguished with the Fall of the Republic of Venice in 1797. The palace is now privately owned and is said to retain frescoes by the 19th-century painter Jacopo Guarana.

== See also ==
- Palazzo Bollani Erizzo
