= List of princes of Zeta =

This is a list of princes of Zeta.

== Background ==
After Constantin Bodin's death, fighting among his potential successors weakened the state of Duklja and the region succumbed to Rascia's reign between 1183 and 1186.

In 1190, Grand Župan of Rascia Stefan Nemanja's son, Vukan II, asserted his right to the Dukljan crown. In 1219, the regent of Zeta and King Vukan's oldest son, Đorđe Nemanjić, became king of Duklja/Zeta, while Vukan's second son Stefan Vukanović built the Assumption of the Virgin Monastery in Morača.

Between 1276 and 1309, Zeta was ruled by Queen Jelena, widow of Serbia's King Uroš I. She restored around 50 monasteries in the region—most notably Saint Srđ and Vakh on the Bojana River. The name Crna Gora (Montenegro) was formally mentioned for the first time in 1296, in the charter of St. Nicholas' monastery in Vranjina, issued by the Serbian King Stefan Milutin Nemanjić. Crna Gora (Montenegro) was to be understood as the highland region under Mount Lovćen, within the confines of Zeta. By the beginning of the 14th century, during King Milutin's reign, the Archdiocese in Bar was the strongest feudal lord in Zeta.

From 1309 to 1321, Zeta was co-ruled by the oldest son of King Milutin, Young King Stefan Uroš III Dečanski who was appointed governor. Similarly, from 1321 to 1331, Stefan's young son Stefan Dušan Uroš IV Nemanjić, the future Serbian King and Tsar, co-ruled Zeta with his father.

After Tsar Dušan's death in 1355, the Serbian state Kingdom started to crumble and its holdings were divided among Prince (Knjaz) Lazar Hrebeljanović, the short-lived (1353–1391) Bosnian state of Tvrtko I Kotromanić, and a semi-independent chiefdom of Zeta under the House of Balšić, whose founder Balša I came to power in 1356.

== Zeta ==
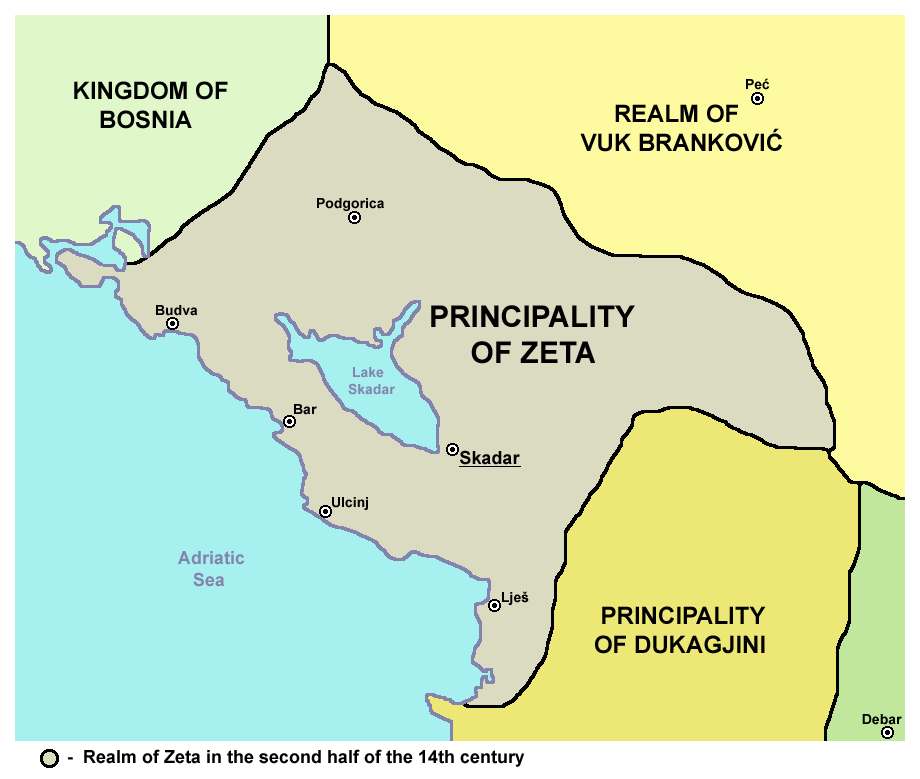
Principality of Zeta at the end of the 14th century

The Principality of Zeta (Serbian: Кнежевина Зета / Kneževina Zeta) is a historiographical name for a late medieval principality located in the southern parts of modern Montenegro and northern parts of modern Albania, around the Lake of Skadar. It was ruled by the families of Balšić, Lazarević, Branković and Crnojević in succession from the second half of the 14th century until Ottoman conquest at the very end of the 15th century. Previously, the same region of Zeta was a Serbian crown land that had become independent after the fall of the Serbian Empire, when the Balšić family created a regional principality, sometime after 1360.

The region of Zeta was part of the Serbian Empire ruled by the House of Nemanjić. In the mid-14th century in the Lower Zeta region, a minor noble family known as the House of Balšić came to prominence and in 1360 they were enthroned as rulers of the state under Tsar Uroš. The Serbian Empire became increasingly fragmented as local lords started acting increasingly independently, including the Balšić family. After the Battle of Marica in 1371, Emperor Uroš died in 1371 and no one succeeded him to the throne.

In 1421, the Balšić family was succeeded by the House of Lazarević.

=== House of Balšić ===
The Balšić family members all had their own lands which they held collectively, but at various times they were presided over by a head of the family:

- Balša I (1356–1362)
- Đurađ I (1362–1378)
- Balša II (1378–1385)
- Đurađ II (1385–1403)
- Balša III (1403–1421)

=== House of Lazarević ===
- Despot Stefan Lazarević (1421–1427)

=== House of Branković ===
In 1427 the Serbian despot died and the throne through adoptive lineage passes on to the House of Branković, according to the treaty; they inherit the Zetan territories. The Lazarevic and Brankovic houses use the legitimate right they had succeeded from the Balsics in order to claim supremacy over the Crnojevic house as well, in the Upper Zeta region (Montenegro proper).

- Despot Đurađ Branković (1427–1456)

In 1453, the Serbian Despotate launched a final, unsuccessful campaign agaist the Crnojević house. After defeating the Branković forces, Stefan Crnojević launched a counteroffensive along the Morača and Zeta rivers, successfully capturing Upper Zeta. Only the fortress of Medun successfully resisted his advance. The Serbian Despotate was unable to organize a counteroffensive due to its military obligations to the Ottoman Empire, which required Serbian troops to assist Sultan Mehmed II during the siege of Constantinople in 1453. Following the fall of the Byzantine capital, Ottoman forces advanced into Serbia and Zeta. Between late 1455 and early 1456, Ottoman forces also captured the fortress of Medun.

=== House of Crnojević ===
The House of Crnojević was a dynasty ruling in the Medieval state of Zeta, first struggling with House of Balšić for control over Zeta, and then succeeding them as Zeta's supreme overlords throughout the 14th and 15th century. Since the second half of the 15th century, they would play a crucial role in the survival of late Medieval Zeta. All members of the House of Crnojević considered themselves Lords Zetan.

Name	Reign	Territory	Notes
Radič	end of the 14th century–1396	Zeta	
Đurađ Đurašević and Aleksa Đurašević	1403–1435	Zeta	Ruled as vassals of the Venetians
Gojčin (Gojčin, Goycinus)	1435–1451	Zeta	Ruled under Đurađ Branković (Serbian Despotate)
Stefan I	1451–1465	Zeta	Ruled under the Despotate 1451–1452, then under Venetian rule
Ivan I	1465–1490	Zeta	
Đurađ IV	1490–1496	Zeta	
Stefan II	1496–1499	Zeta	Nominal ruler under Ottoman suzerainty

== See also ==
- List of monarchs of Duklja
- List of rulers of Montenegro
- Zeta (crown land)
- First Scutari War
- Second Scutari War
- History of Montenegro
- Venetian Albania
