= Sanjak of Montenegro =

Administrative province of Ottoman empire

- Sanjak of the Ottoman Empire
- 1514–1528
- Flag
- Capital: Cetinje
- Demonym: Montenegrin
- History
  - Zeta: 1514
  - Disestablished: 1528
Preceded by	Succeeded by
Zeta under the Crnojevići; Sanjak of Scutari	Montenegro Vilayet; Sanjak of Scutari
- Today part of: Montenegro

The Sanjak of Montenegro (Montenegrin and Serbian Cyrillic: Санџак Црне Горе, romanized: Sandžak Crne Gore; Turkish: Karadağ Sancağı, literally Sanjak of the Black Mountain) was a province (sanjak) of the Ottoman Empire in the Balkan Peninsula roughly corresponding to modern Montenegro. It was created in 1514 from the borders of the former Zeta, ruled by the Crnojevići, which had earlier been organized into the Sanjak of Scutari in 1499.

== History ==
The greater part of the Zetan principality lost its status as an independent state, becoming a vassal state of the Ottoman Empire, until it was added to the Ottoman administrative unit of Sanjak of Scutari in 1499. In 1514 this territory was separated from the Sanjak of Scutari and established as a separate Sanjak of Montenegro, under the rule of Skenderbeg Crnojević.

In 1523, the resm-i filori of Montenegro (Karadağ), which had the status of hass, was made up of 33 akçe in poll-tax, a 20 akçe İspençe and 2 akçe for the collector. When Skenderbeg Crnojević died in 1528, the Sanjak of Montenegro was joined to the Sanjak of Scutari, as a unique administrative unit with certain degree of autonomy.

== Aftermath ==
The Sanjak was reorganized into a vilayet of the Sanjak of Scutari, the Montenegro Vilayet (vilayet-i Kara Dag).

== Governors ==
- Skenderbeg Crnojević (1514–1528)
