= Ramuald Ziamkievič =

Polish-Belarusian bibliographer, publicist and collector (1881–1943/44)

Romuald Ziemkiewicz
- Рамуальд Зямкевіч
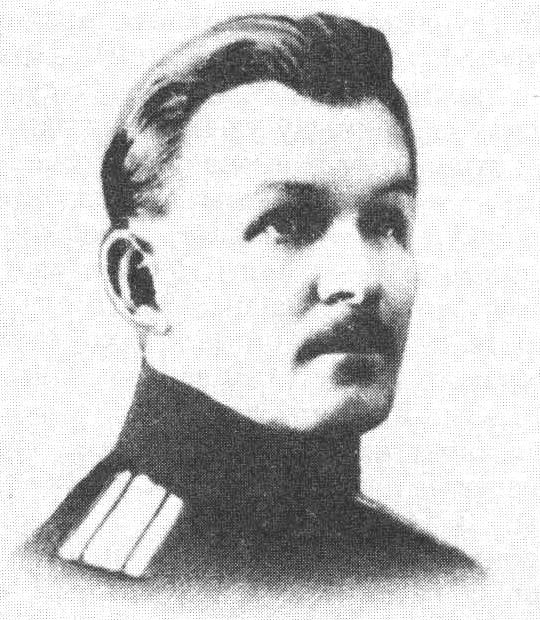
- Ziemkiewicz in uniform (c. 1915–1917)
- Born: February 7, 1881; Warsaw, Congress Poland, Russian Empire
- Died: 1943 or 1944; Likely Auschwitz concentration camp, Nazi Germany
- Occupations: Bibliographer, publicist, literary historian, collector
- Political party: Belarusian People's Party of Socialists
- Spouse: Leonia (née Dunin-Borkowska)

Ramuald Ziamkievič (Рамуальд Зямкевіч), Romuald Ziemkiewicz (Romuald Ziemkiewicz; 7 February 1881 – 1943 or 1944) was a Belarusian and Polish bibliographer, publicist, historian of Belarusian literature, collector of books and manuscripts, and politician. He was a participant in the First All-Belarusian Congress of 1917 and a member of the Rada of the Belarusian Democratic Republic. Ziamkievič is also known for falsifying his biography and stealing valuable archival materials.

== Biography ==
=== Early life ===
Ziamkievič was born in Warsaw. He is known for falsifying his own biography. He claimed his father's name was Aleksander (hence he is listed as Ramuald Aliaksandravič Ziamkievič in some Belarusian encyclopedias), but in reality, his father was Michał Ziemkiewicz (c. 1829–1888). In 1875, Michał Ziemkiewicz, together with Wiktoryn Noakowski, bought a printing house in Warsaw. After his death, the business was run by his wife, Maria, Romuald's mother. Ziamkievič later claimed his parents were from the Slutsk region, but there is no evidence for this.

He studied at a Warsaw gymnasium, where he became close to bibliophile Zygmunt Wolski. In 1906–1907, he worked at the antiquarian bookshop of Hieronim Wilder in Warsaw. He collaborated with scholars Yefim Karsky and Michał Federowski. According to bibliophile Jan Michalski, Ziemkiewicz was obsessed with collecting books and was once caught stealing from Wilder and Federowski, but was spared punishment in hopes of reform.

After this incident, Ziamkievič moved to Vilnius, where he became involved with the Belarusian national movement. In 1908, he collected folklore in the Braslaw and Barysaw regions. He worked as a tutor in private estates, including Kazimirau near Zembin. He wore the uniform of a student of the Kyiv Polytechnic Institute, although later investigations revealed he had forged his engineering diploma.

From 1909, he published articles in Nasha Niva. He established close contacts with Belarusian organizations and the Belarusian Scientific and Literary Circle of students in Saint Petersburg.

=== Minsk period ===
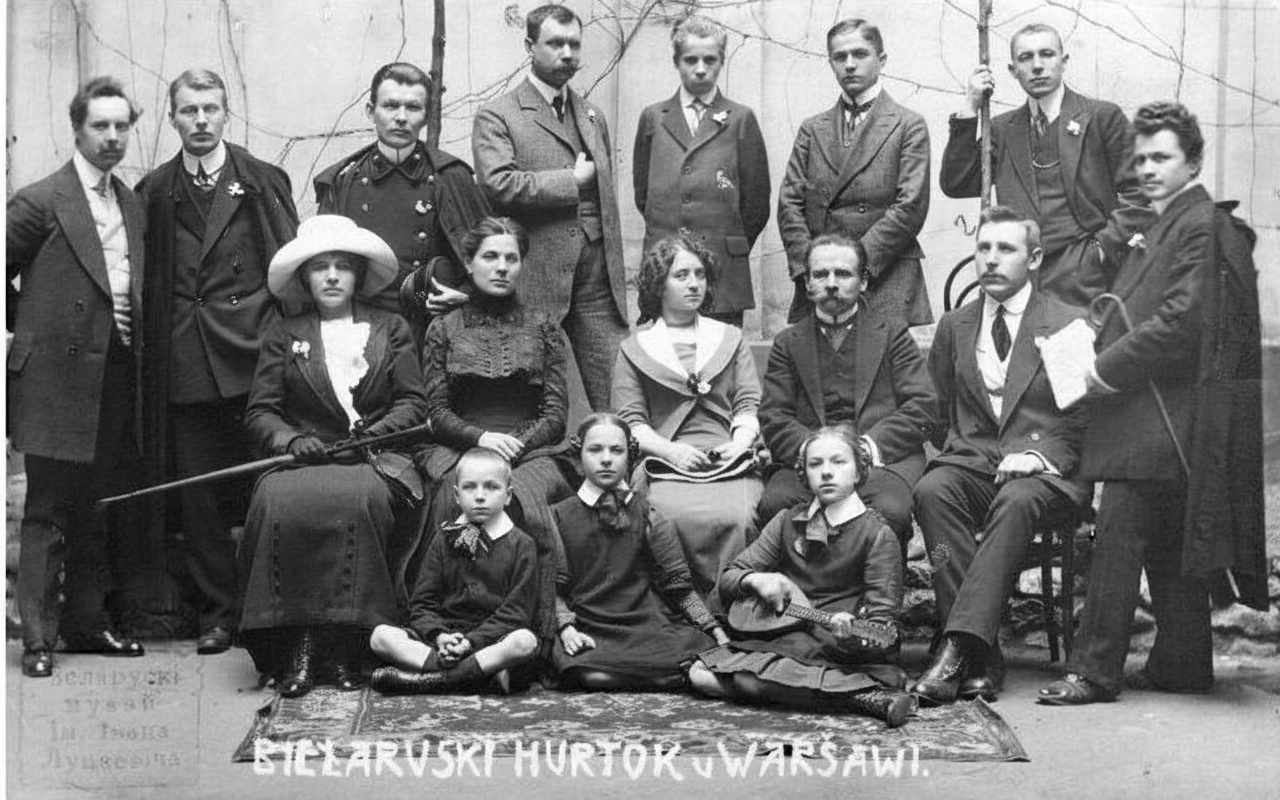
Belarusian circle in Warsaw, 1912. Ziemkiewicz stands third from left.

During World War I (1915–1917), he lived in Minsk, working as a military engineer. He wore a colonel's uniform, likely without authorization. He participated in the First All-Belarusian Congress in December 1917 and was a member of the Belarusian People's Party of Socialists.

In 1918, he became a member of the Rada of the Belarusian Democratic Republic. During the Soviet–Polish War, after the Bolsheviks took Minsk in December 1918, he remained in the city and was arrested. He described the Bolshevik occupation in the newspaper Baćkaŭščyna. After the Polish army took Minsk in August 1919, he joined the Provisional Belarusian National Committee.

=== In Poland ===
Ziamkievič likely left Minsk with the Polish troops in July 1920. He settled in Warsaw. In 1922, he participated in the parliamentary campaign in Poland as part of a Polonophile Belarusian group, supporting Józef Piłsudski's policies. From November 1922, he was an informant for the Second Department of Polish General Staff (intelligence), reporting on Belarusian activists. However, the intelligence service doubted the reliability of his reports.

He worked as an engineer in the Supreme Audit Office using a forged diploma but was dismissed in 1929 due to a lack of qualifications. In 1932, he was arrested for stealing autographs of Adam Mickiewicz and Cyprian Norwid from the Polish Library in Rapperswil and attempting to sell them to the National Library of Poland. A year later, he was accused of stealing pages from the album of Maryla Wereszczakówna. During the trial, his forged credentials and pension fraud were exposed, and he was sentenced to prison.

Anton Luckievich accused Ziamkievič of misappropriating the entire printed archive of the Belarusian Socialist Assembly, which had been entrusted to him in 1913.

After the German occupation of Poland, he was arrested in Warsaw. His collections were lost in the destroyed city. It is believed that he died in the Auschwitz concentration camp in 1943 or 1944, although he has not been identified in prisoner databases.

== Scholarly and research activity ==
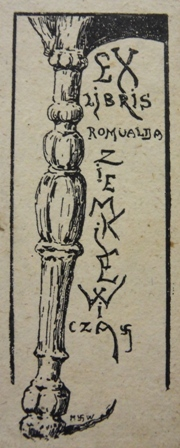
Ex libris of Romuald Ziemkiewicz by Marian Wawrzeniecki, 1920–1939

Cover of Ziamkievič's book Jan Barščeŭski — The First Belarusian Writer of the 19th Century (1911)

From 1909, Ziamkievič published articles in Nasha Niva and other Belarusian publications. He researched Belarusian bibliography, ancient Belarusian literature, Belarusian literature of the 19th century, ethnography, Belarusian folk aesthetics, folklore, and Belarusian art. He prepared and published the first specialized bibliographic guide in the Belarusian language — Belarusian Bibliography (1910). He wrote a number of works on the history of Belarusian literature, writing about Vincent Dunin-Marcinkievič, Jan Barszczewski, Adam Kirkor, Aliaksandr Jelski, Yanka Luchyna, Karuś Kahaniec, Maksim Bahdanovič, and others. He published previously unknown manuscripts of Maksim Bahdanovič (1919), Karuś Kahaniec (1920), Vincent Dunin-Marcinkievič (1923), and Yanka Luchyna (1932).

In 1919, in the magazine Bielaruskaje žyćcio (No. 5), he published for the first time an engraved portrait of Vasil Ciapinski (1576), which he claimed to have found in the library of K. Swiętopełk-Zawadzki in Kroshyn; researchers consider the portrait to be a forgery by Ziamkievič. He assisted Yefim Karsky with materials and information, exchanged scientific information with Aliaksandr Jelski and Aliaksandr Šliubski, and provided his archival findings, manuscripts, and memoirs to the Warsaw Slavist Józef Gołąbek when the latter was working on a monograph about Vincent Dunin-Marcinkievič.

Ziamkievič amassed a unique library on history, linguistics (including all works of Yefim Karsky), literature, and folklore of Belarus, Ukraine, Lithuania, Poland, and other Slavs, as well as a large collection of manuscripts by Belarusian writers. Among the rarities of his library were numerous early printed books, including the Bible of Francysk Skaryna, the Ostrog Bible (1581), the Lexicon of Pamvo Berynda, the Chronicle of Marcin Bielski, Kitabs of the 16th–17th centuries, autographs of Aliaksandr Rypinski, Arciom Viaryha-Dareŭski, Vincent Dunin-Marcinkievič, Yanka Luchyna, Francišak Bahuševič, Jadvihin Š. (the manuscript of his drama The Thief), Yanka Kupala, Yakub Kolas, Maksim Bahdanovič, authors of Nasha Dolya and Nasha Niva, and others. In his works, he cited new information and published unknown manuscripts of Belarusian writers of the 19th and early 20th centuries. Most of his rich collections, as well as part of his own manuscripts (in particular, the manuscript of the book A Short Outline of the History of Belarusian Music), were lost. Individual manuscripts and letters are preserved in archives and libraries in Minsk, Vilnius, Warsaw, and Saint Petersburg.

== Literary work ==
In 1942–1943, under the pseudonym Šeršań (Hornet), he published satirical poems in the Białystok newspaper Novaja daroha. He also wrote poems in Polish. He translated into Belarusian works by the Ukrainian writer Vasyl Stefanyk (published in Nasha Niva) and the Frenchman Alphonse Daudet. Pseudonyms and cryptonyms: Раман Суніца (Raman Sunica); Юры Алелькавіч (Jury Alieĺkavič); Саўка Барывой (Saŭka Baryvoj); Шэршань (Šeršań); Р. Зем. (R. Ziem.); Ром. Зем. (Rom. Ziem.); Р-н Сун. (R-n Sun.); Р. С-ца (R. S-ca).

== Bibliography ==
- "Беларуская бібліяграфія: Беларускія кнігі XVI—XVIII стст." (Belarusian Bibliography: Belarusian Books of the 16th–18th Centuries). In: Pieršy biełaruski kaliandar «Našaje nivy» na 1910 h. Vilnius, 1910.
- "Вінцук Дунін-Марцінкевіч, яго жыцьцё і літаратурнае значэньне" (Vincuk Dunin-Marcinkievič, His Life and Literary Significance). In: Naša niva, 25 November 1910.
- "Адам Ганоры Кіркор: Біяграфічна-бібліяграфічны нарыс у 25-летнюю гадаўшчыну сьмерці" (Adam Honory Kirkor: A Biographical-Bibliographical Sketch on the 25th Anniversary of His Death). Vilnius, 1911.
- "Ян Баршчэўскі — першы беларускі пісьменьнік ХІХ сталецьця: Успаміны ў 60-ю гадаўшчыну сьмерці" (Jan Barščeŭski — The First Belarusian Writer of the 19th Century: Memoirs on the 60th Anniversary of His Death). Vilnius, 1911.
- "Тарас Шаўчэнка і беларусы" (Taras Shevchenko and Belarusians). In: Naša niva, 24 February 1911.
- "Гульня «Курылка»" (The Game "Kurylka"). In: Naša niva, 1 March 1912.
- "М-ка Крошын" (Town Krošyn). In: Bielarus, 4 June 1915.
- "400-лецьце беларускага друку" (400th Anniversary of Belarusian Printing). In: Volnaja Bielaruś, 8 August 1917.
- "Значэньне Францішка Скарыны ў беларускай культуры" (The Significance of Francysk Skaryna in Belarusian Culture). In: Volnaja Bielaruś, 11 August 1917.
- "Друк Скарыны і друк сучасны" (Skaryna's Printing and Modern Printing). In: Volnaja Bielaruś, 23 August 1917.
- "Няміга і Менск. Старая беларуская пісьменнасьць" (Nyamiha and Minsk. Old Belarusian Literature). In: Varta, 1918, No. 1.
- "Цукраварні на Беларусі" (Sugar Refineries in Belarus). [Minsk], 1918.
- "Францыск Скарына" (Francysk Skaryna). In: Bielaruskaje žyćcio, 6 July 1919.
- "Васіль Цяпінскі" (Vasil Ciapinski). In: Bielaruskaje žyćcio, 14 July 1919.
- "Беларускія назовы вуліцаў у Менску" (Belarusian Names of Streets in Minsk). In: Bielaruś, 4 November 1919.
- "Стары замак у Менску" (The Old Castle in Minsk). In: Bielaruś, 14–15 November 1919.
- "Стары Менск у беларускіх успамінах" (Old Minsk in Belarusian Memoirs). In: Bielaruś, 26–27 November 1919; 3, 13 January 1920.
- "Варункі нацыянальнага адраджэньня" (Conditions of National Revival). In: Zvon, 3 October 1919.
- "Станіслаў Манюшка і беларусы" (Stanisław Moniuszko and Belarusians). In: Bielaruskaje žyćcio, 19 January 1920.
- "Гутаркі аб беларускай літаратуры" (Conversations about Belarusian Literature). In: Novaje žyćcio, 3 March 1923.
- "Нацыянальнасьць у Вінцука Дуніна-Марцінкевіча" (Nationality in Vincuk Dunin-Marcinkievič). In: Zachodniaja Bielaruś. Vilnius, 1924.
- "Аб беларускай народнай эстэтыцы" (On Belarusian Folk Aesthetics). In: Maładniak, 1927, No. 3.
- "Ян Неслухоўскі (Янка Лучына) і яго няведамыя вершы" (Jan Niesłuchoŭski (Yanka Luchyna) and His Unknown Poems). In: Nioman, 1932, No. 2.

== Sources ==
- Michaluk, Dorota (2006). "«Jestem przyjacielem Białorusinów...» — raporty wywiadowcze Romualda Ziemkiewicza do II Oddziału Sztabu Generalnego WP z lat 1922—1923" ["I am a friend of Belarusians..." — intelligence reports of Romuald Ziemkiewicz...] (PDF). Białoruskie Zeszyty Historyczne (in Polish). 25: 209–258.
