= Oktoikh =

Oktoikh or Oktoih (Russian and Serbian Cyrillic: Октоих) may refer to:

- The title of the Church Slavonic Octoechos, an Orthodox liturgical book
- Oktoikh, 1491, the first printing of Oktoikh
- Oktoih, a 1494 printing of Oktoikh
- Oktoikh ensemble
