= Bible of Francysk Skaryna =

First printed East Slavic Bible (1517–1519)

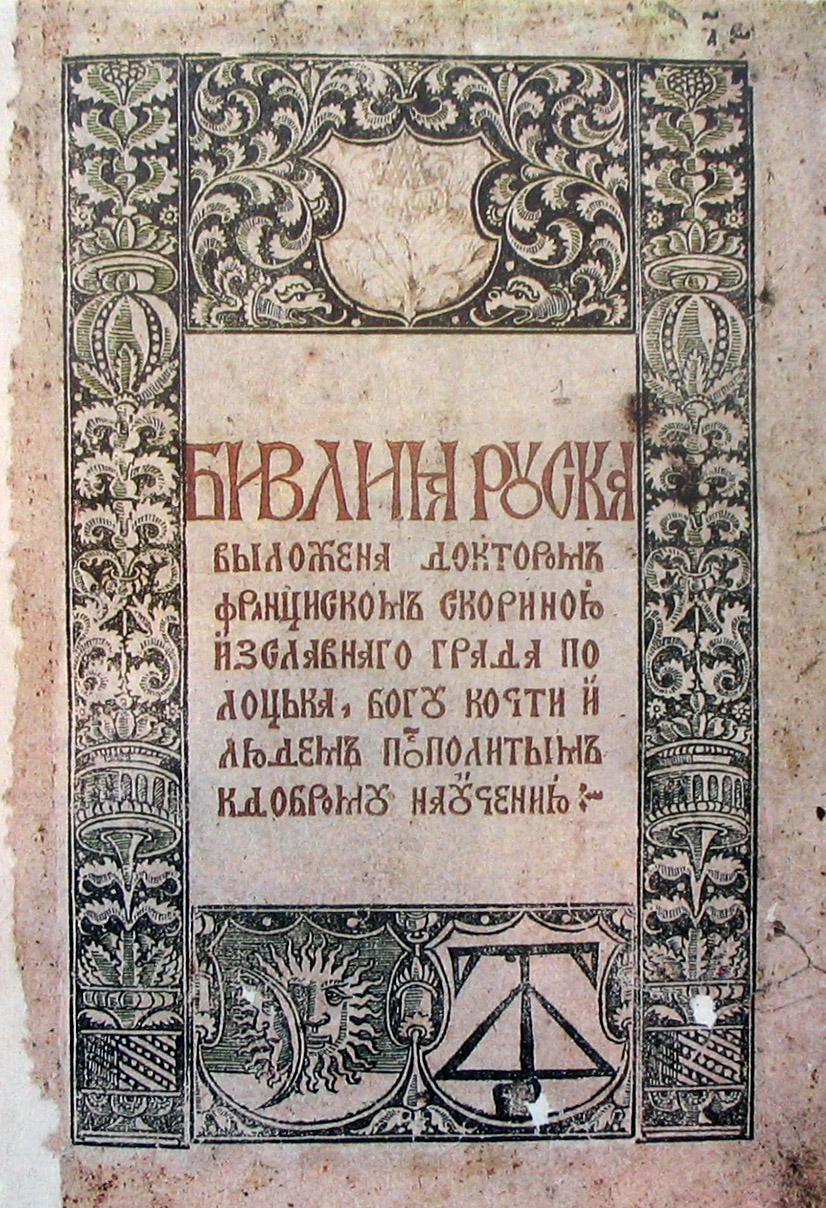
- Title page of the Bible of Francysk Skaryna
- Author: Francysk Skaryna
- Original title: Бивлия руска
- Language: Old Belarusian
- Genre: Bible translation
- Publisher: Francysk Skaryna
- Publication date: 1517–1519 (Prague); 1525 (Vilna)
- Publication place: Bohemia, Grand Duchy of Lithuania
- Pages: approx. 2400

The Bible of Francysk Skaryna (Бі́блія Францы́ска Скары́ны) is the first printed East Slavic book, published by Francysk Skaryna in 1517–1519 in Prague in the Belarusian redaction of the Church Slavonic language.

== Books ==
The Skaryna Bible consists of 20 books (or 23 books if each book of Kingdoms is counted separately) of the Old Testament, totaling 2,400 pages, under the general title "Бивлия руска, выложена докторомъ Францискомъ Скориною (й)из славнаго града Полоцька, Богу ко ч(ес)ти (й)и людем посполитым к доброму на(в)учени" ("Ruthenian Bible, translated by Doctor Francysk Skaryna from the glorious city of Polotsk, to the honor of God and for the good instruction of the common people").

The books were published in the following order:

1. Psalter ("Песни царя Давыда еже словуть Псалтыр") – 6 August 1517
2. Book of Job ("Книга светого Иова") – 10 September 1517
3. Proverbs ("Притчи Саломона царя Израилева, сына Давыдова") – 6 October 1517
4. Book of Jesus Sirach ("Книга Исуса Сирахова, рекомая Панаретос, Еклесиастыкус или Церъковник") – 5 December 1517
5. Ecclesiastes ("Еклесиастесъ, или Соборникъ премудрого царя Саломона") – 2 January 1518
6. Song of Songs ("Книга премудрого царя Соломона, рекомая Песнь Песням") – 9 January 1518
7. Book of Wisdom ("Премудрости Божией книга") – 19 January 1518
8. Books of Kings ("Книги царьствь") – 10 December 1518
9. Book of Joshua ("Книга Исуса Навина") – 20 December 1518
10. Book of Judith ("Книги Иудифъ вдовици") – 9 February 1519
11. Book of Judges ("Кніга Суддзяў")
12. Book of Genesis ("Кніга Быццё")
13. Deuteronomy ("Книги пятыи Моисеовы, зовемые от евреи Гельгадворим, по-гречески Девтерномос, по латине Секунда лекс, а по рускии Вторый закон") – 1519
14. Book of Daniel ("Книги светого пророка Даниила") – 1519
15. Book of Esther ("Эсъферъ")
16. Book of Ruth ("Книга о Руфееже")
17. Book of Lamentations ("Книжка, рекомая Плачъ Еремиін")
18. Book of Exodus ("Книги вторые Моисеовы, зовемые Исход") – 1519
19. Leviticus ("Лявіт")
20. Book of Numbers ("Лічбы")

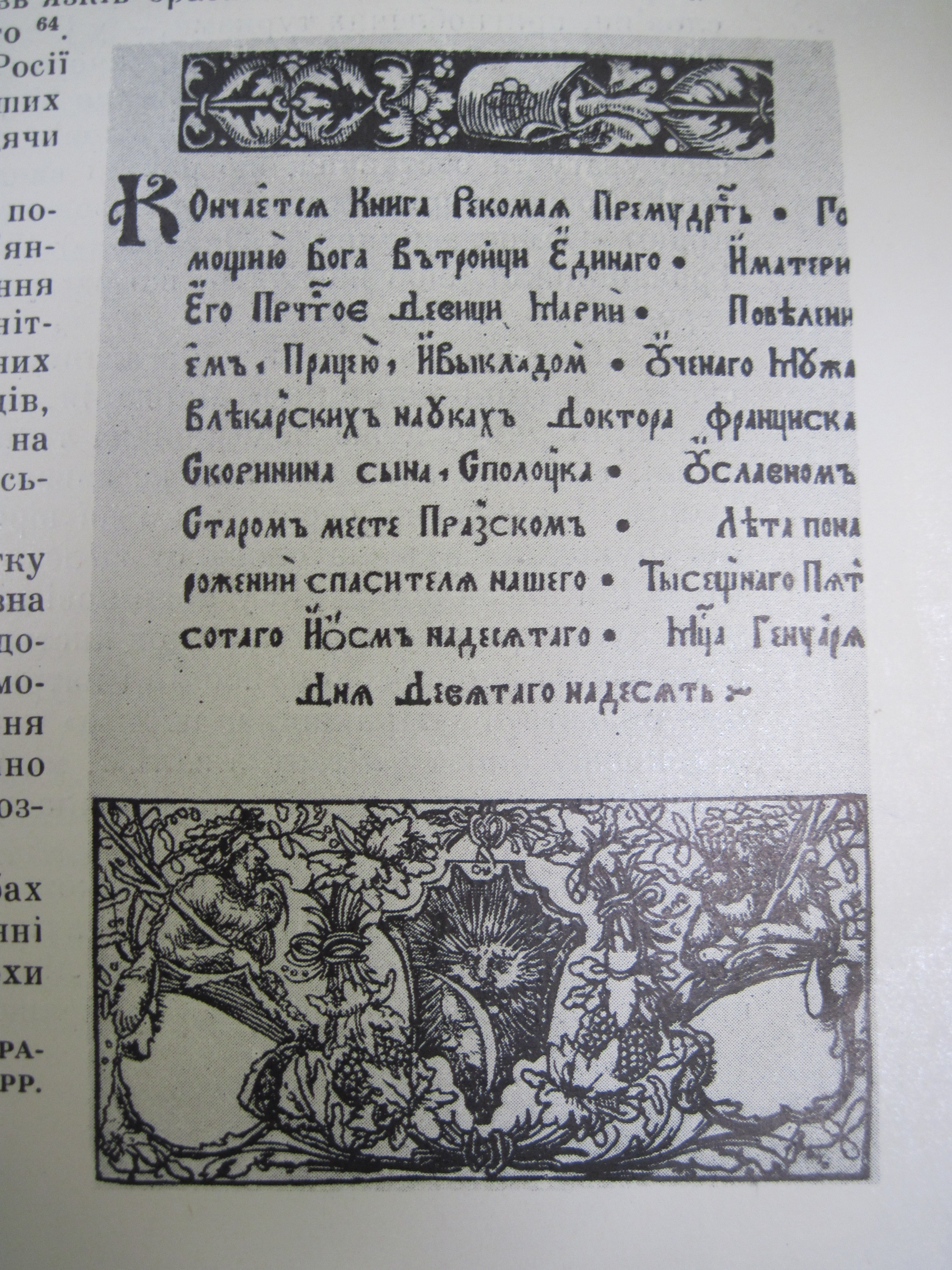
The Book of Proverbs

In 1525, the Acts and Epistles of the Apostles ("Деания и посълания Апостольская") were printed in Vilna, consisting of 4 parts:

1. Acts of the Apostles
2. 7 Catholic epistles (3 of Peter, 3 of John, 1 of Jude)
3. 14 Pauline epistles
4. "Sobornik" (General collection)

Skaryna's published books do not include the Prophets or Chronicles. The Russian historian Mikhail Pogodin possessed a manuscript list of books in Skaryna's redaction, which included the Prophets. In 1865, Yakov Golovatsky discovered the Book of Chronicles in a manuscript list of Skaryna's books in the library of the Onuphrius Monastery in Lviv. Thus, it is likely that Skaryna translated all the books of the Bible but was either unable to publish them or they were published but have not survived.

The order in which Skaryna published the books does not correspond to the canonical order in the Bible. It is believed that this order was determined by the sequence of studying the Seven liberal arts, for which Skaryna recommended specific books as educational aids.

== Translation ==
The linguistic tradition of Skaryna's editions is defined by Belarusian linguists as the Belarusian redaction of the Church Slavonic language. At the same time, the publications of the first East Slavic printer contain a significant amount of uniquely Belarusian vocabulary, which has Proto-Slavic or Old East Slavic origins and in most cases continues the tradition of the Old East Slavic language, which served as the medium of written communication for East Slavs until the 14th century.

Researchers identify the most ancient lexical units preserved in their Belarusian phonetic form: вежа (tower), волотъ (giant), гай (grove), детинство (childhood), жниво (harvest), згода (agreement), клопотъ (solicitude), криница (well), лосеня (elk calf), лытка (calf of the leg), медведеня (bear cub), помста (revenge), промень (ray), севба (sowing), смутокъ (sorrow), стежка (path), стрижень (core), початокъ (beginning), узгорокъ (hillock); adjectives горший (worse), даремный (futile), дробный (small/petty), житний (rye), лагодный (gentle), приветливый (welcoming), пригожий (beautiful), росный (dewy); verbs гучати (to sound), досягати (to reach), змовитися (to conspire), лаяти (to scold), робити (to do/make), ховати (to hide); adverbs вдолжъ (along), домовъ (homeward), досыть (enough), лепей (better), николи (never), and others.

Skaryna based his translations of biblical texts on two sources: the Vulgate of Jerome and the Czech Bible of 1506. Due to the peculiarities of the Czech translation, which were transferred into Skaryna's books, the latter were rejected by both the Orthodox and Catholic churches.

As follows from Skaryna's preface to the First Book of Kingdoms, he translated all the books of the Old and New Testaments "into the Ruthenian language". This is confirmed by manuscripts found in the 19th century by Yakov Golovatsky in the Lviv Onuphrius Monastery, which included an additional 30 books identified as Skaryna's based on their prefaces.

== Description ==
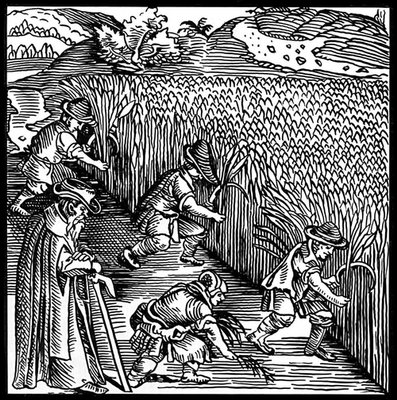
Title page of the Book of Ruth. Woodcut.

Before each book, Skaryna added his own prefaces with various information on history, geography, culture, and a brief summary of the content. In the margins, he provided explanations of difficult words and references to parallel passages.

For the first time in Cyrillic printing, Skaryna introduced a title page, pagination (foliation), spaces between words, and paragraph indentations, and also abandoned the use of abbreviations (titlo). The text itself is divided into chapters, with a short summary written by Skaryna added at the beginning of each chapter. At the same time, Skaryna preserved the traditions of manuscripts, such as headpieces with Byzantine ornamentation. To help the reader better understand the text, illustrations (engravings) were included in the books.

The dimensions of Skaryna's editions indicate that his Bible was intended for daily reading rather than for liturgical purposes. While altar Gospels at that time were made in folio size ("in sheet"), Skaryna's books were printed in quarto ("in four") or even octavo ("in eight"), making them more convenient to use.

The publisher included 51 illustrations, about 30 headpieces, and about 1000 initials in the first Belarusian Bible.

The extent of Francysk Skaryna's participation in the creation of the engravings remains undetermined. According to the prevailing opinion, Skaryna was most likely the draftsman of individual engravings and could have played the role of a consultant. He undoubtedly authored all the captions for the illustrations and designed the font of the Bible, which could not have been produced without Skaryna's preliminary sketches.

== Significance ==
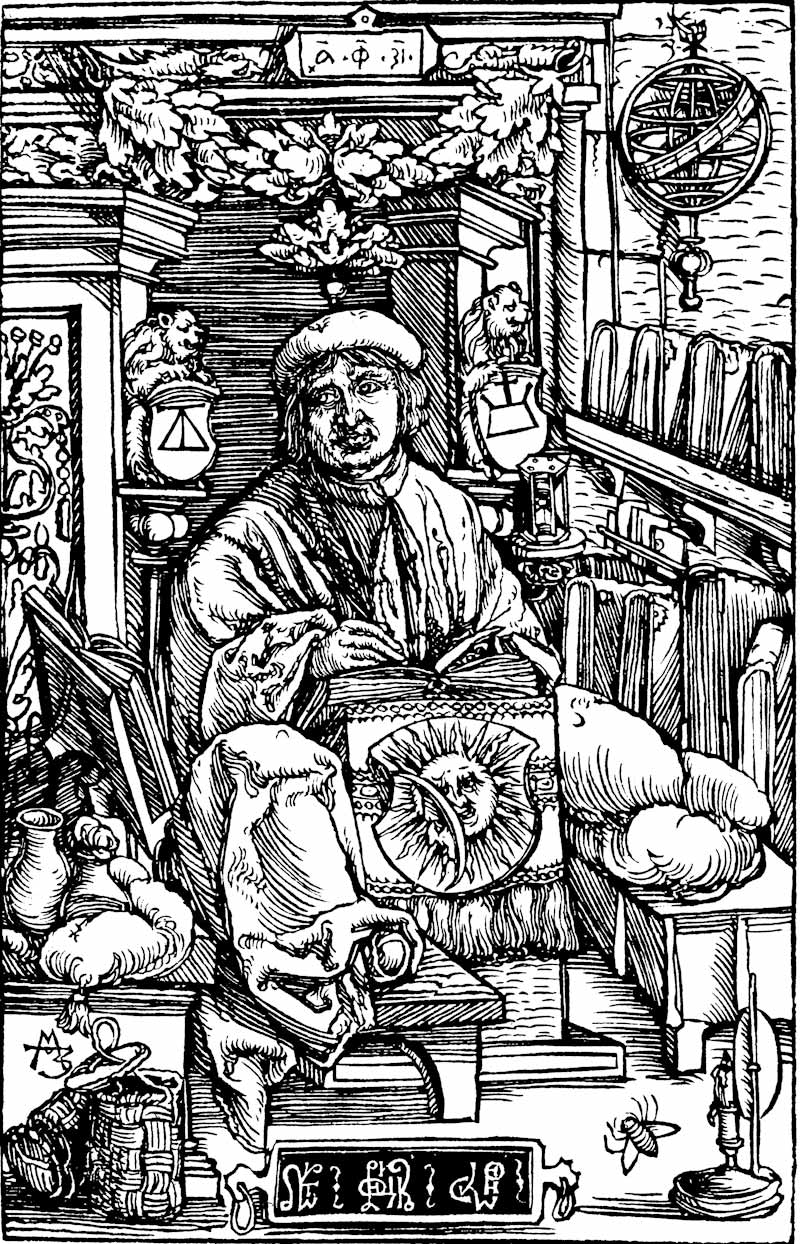
Engraved portrait of Francysk Skaryna from the Bible

Skaryna's books laid the foundation for the standardization of the Belarusian literary language and became the second translation of the Bible into a Slavic language (after Czech). According to politician Paval Sieviaryniec, it was the fourth translation in the world into "a living language of the people" (after German, Italian, and Czech). However, philologist Iryna Budzko notes that the sacred text could not be written "simply" (for Skaryna, "ruskiy" did not mean "simple" or "vernacular"), but had to correspond to a high bookish style. Theologian and Doctor of Philosophy Iryna Dubianieckaja also notes that Skaryna's Bible was translated "not into a living language," which was one of the reasons why the printer's edition did not play a major cultural role for Belarus at that time.

Despite the restrained or even hostile reaction of the Orthodox clergy, Skaryna's translations circulated widely throughout the Grand Duchy of Lithuania. A century later, the Uniate Archimandrite Anton Sielava, addressing the Orthodox, wrote:

Before the Union, there was Skaryna, a heretic Hussite, who printed books for you in Prague in Ruthenian.

An attempt to distribute the Prague edition in the Grand Duchy of Moscow in 1525 ended unsuccessfully. Orthodox hierarchs saw a Lutheran influence in Skaryna's Bible and ordered all imported copies to be burned. Throughout the 16th century, the name of the Belarusian first printer was banned there.

It is significant that Ivan Fyodorov and Pyotr Mstislavets, when publishing the Teaching Gospel ("Yevangeliye uchitelnoye") in Zabludiv (Zabludov printing house), initially prepared it in Belarusian, likely using Francysk Skaryna's translation, as implied in their preface. Symon Budny and Vasil Ciapinski referred to him in their works. The first Protestant pastor of Prussia, Paul Speratus, carefully preserved the Psalter from Skaryna's Little Travel Book.

Thus, Skaryna's publishing activity was of exceptional importance in the history of Belarusian culture. By translating biblical books into a language understandable to the people and publishing them in a significant circulation for that time, Skaryna contributed to the formation and consolidation of the Belarusian literary language and had a great influence on its further development. The typographical features of the editions (format, fonts, design, character, and content of prefaces and afterwords) had a significant impact on the further development of Belarusian, Russian, and Ukrainian book printing.

== Modernity ==
Worldwide, 40 convolutes (bound collections) of Skaryna's books are known, located in Great Britain, Denmark, Lithuania, Poland, Slovenia, Russia, and Ukraine. In Belarus, only one collection of 10 books is preserved, purchased in 1925 from a Leningrad collector named Komarnitsky. This is one of the most valuable collections in the funds of the National Library of Belarus.

In 1990–1991, the "Piatrus Brouka Belarusian Soviet Encyclopedia" publishing house released a three-volume facsimile reproduction of the Bible published by Francysk Skaryna in 1517–1519.

In 2003, during an exhibition of rare books at the Upper Lusatian Library of Sciences in Görlitz (Germany), eleven separate Prague editions of Skaryna, bound together in 1615, were accidentally discovered. According to the library card file, this Bible was donated in 1520 to Breslau to a certain Andreas Bank, who later gifted it to the famous religious figure Johann Hess. According to Professor Norbert Randow of Berlin University, Hess preached the Word of God to Upper Lusatian Sorbs using this Bible. Six books of the Görlitz convolute have no equivalents in the funds of the National Library of Belarus. In October 2012, the Görlitz convolute was brought to Belarus for the first time.

In 2014, a Bible of Francysk Skaryna created using ancient technologies was published. The edition was printed on handmade paper from Belarusian flax on a press reconstructed from 16th-century engravings. Special matrices and molds were cast for the production of the editions, just as Skaryna himself once did. Some copies were hand-painted, and the cover was illustrated by the famous artist Barys Citovič. The ornament motifs were taken from Skaryna's books.

In 2013–2017, "The Book Heritage of Francysk Skaryna" was published – a facsimile reproduction of Francysk Skaryna's Bible in 20 volumes (21 books, with the Apostol published in two books). The project was implemented jointly by the National Library of Belarus and Bank BelVEB. On 19 October 2017, a facsimile was donated to the UN Library.

On 23 April 2025, a presentation of the "Bible of Francysk Skaryna" was held in Minsk at the Theological Institute of Christians of Evangelical Faith. This unique tome, published at the expense of the Bible Society in the Republic of Belarus, includes all biblical books printed by Skaryna in Prague and Vilna in 1517–1525. The text is presented in Old Belarusian language in a modern graphic adaptation. The edition was prepared by Aleś Brazhunoŭ.

== See also ==
- Bible translations into Belarusian
