= Ruml =

Ruml (feminine: Rumlová) is a Czech surname. It was derived either from the German word Rummel ('bustle') or from the given name Romuald. Notable people with the surname include:

- Beardsley Ruml (1894–1960), American economist
- Dillon Ruml (born 1999), American speedway rider
- Jan Ruml (born 1953), Czech politician
- Matouš Ruml (born 1985), Czech actor
- Max Ruml (born 1997), American speedway rider
- Wentzle Ruml (born 1958), American skateboarder
