= Romuald (name) =

Romuald is a masculine given name. Notable people with this name include:

- Romuald I of Benevento (d. 687), Italian noble, duke of Benevento, son of Grimoald
- Romuald II of Benevento (d. 732), Italian noble, duke of Benevento, son of Gisulf I
- Romuald (d. 787), eldest son and heir of Arechis II of Benevento
- Romuald (c. 951–1027), Italian saint and the founder of the Camaldolese order
- Romuald (cardinal) (d. 1136), Italian bishop and cardinal
- Romuald Guarna (c. 1110–1182), Italian bishop and historian
- Romuald Boco (b. 1985), French and Beninese footballer
- Romuald Bourque (1889–1974), Canadian businessman and politician
- Romuald Bulfinsky (1878–1953), Romanian actor and theatrical manager
- Romuald Figuier (1938–2026), French singer
- Romuald Montézuma Gendron (1865–1946), Canadian politician
- Romuald Giedroyć (1750–1824), Polish-Lithuanian general
- Romuald Giegiel (b. 1957), Polish hurdler
- Romuald Gierasieński (1885–1956), Polish actor
- Romuald Grabczewski (1932–2005), Polish chess player
- Romuald Guarna (d. 1181/1182), Archbishop of Salerno
- Romuald Gutt (1888–1974), Polish architect
- Romuald Hazoumè (b. 1962), Beninese artist and sculptor
- Romuald Iodko (1894–1974), Soviet sculptor
- Romuald Jałbrzykowski (1876–1955), Polish Catholic priest
- Romuald Joubé (1876–1949), French stage and film actor
- Romuald Karmakar (born 1965), French film director, screenwriter and producer
- Romuald Muklevich (1890–1938), Soviet military figure
- Romuald Peiser (b. 1979), French football goalkeeper
- Romuald Rajs (1913–1949), Polish soldier
- Romuald Spasowski (1920–1995), Polish diplomat and defector to the United States
- Romuald Traugutt (1826–1864), Polish general
- Romuald Twardowski (1930–2024), Polish composer, pianist, organist and academic teacher
- Romuald Wadagni (born 1976), businessman and president of Benin
- Romuald Zabielski (born 1960), Polish veterinary scientist
- Romuald Ziemkiewicz (1881–1943/44), Polish-Belarusian bibliographer, publicist and collector

== See also ==
- Romualdo
