= Wasyl =

Wasyl is a given name. Notable people with the name include:

- Wasyl Ciapiński (1540–1604), Belarusian-Lithuanian noble, humanist, educator
- Bill Wasyl Diachuk (1929–2014), politician from Alberta, Canada
- Wasyl Eleniak (1859–1956), Ukrainian settler in Canada
- Wasyl Medwit, O.S.B.M. (1949–2024), Polish-born Ukrainian Greek Catholic hierarch
- Demitro (Dick) Wasyl Michayluk (1911–1990), educator and political figure in Saskatchewan
- Konstanty Wasyl Ostrogski (1526–1608), Ruthenian Orthodox magnate of the Polish–Lithuanian Commonwealth
