= Philibert de l'Orme =

French architect and writer

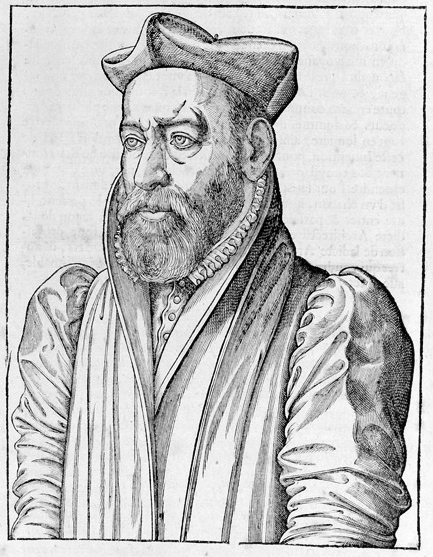
Portrait of Philibert de l'Orme, from a book of 1626

Philibert de l'Orme (pronounced [filibɛːʁ də lɔʁm]) (3-9 June 1514 – 8 January 1570) was a French architect and writer, and one of the great masters of French Renaissance architecture. His surname is also written De l'Orme, de L'Orme, or Delorme.

== Biography ==
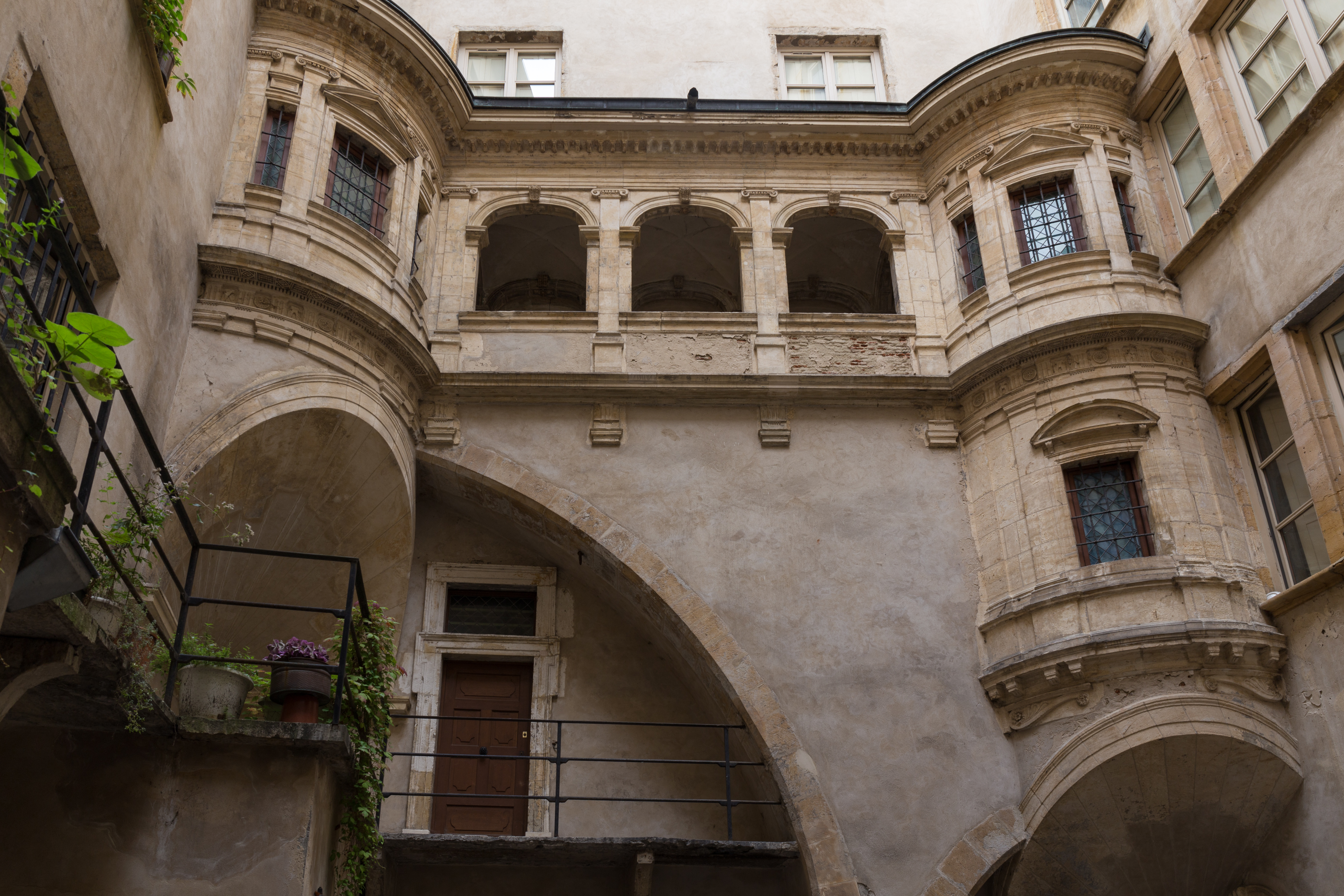
The Hôtel de Bullioud in Lyon

=== Early career ===
Philbert de l'Orme was born between 3 and 9 June 1514 in Lyon. His father was Jehan de L'Orme, a master mason and entrepreneur, who, in the 1530s, employed three hundred workers and built prestigious buildings for the elite of the city. When Philibert was nineteen he departed Lyon for Italy, where he remained for three years, working on building projects for Pope Paul III. In Rome he was introduced to Cardinal Jean du Bellay, the Ambassador of King François I to the Vatican, who became his protector and client. Du Bellay was also the patron of his friend Francois Rabelais. In about 1540 de l'Orme moved to Paris, and was soon occupied with royal projects.

=== Royal architect of Henry II (1548-1559) ===
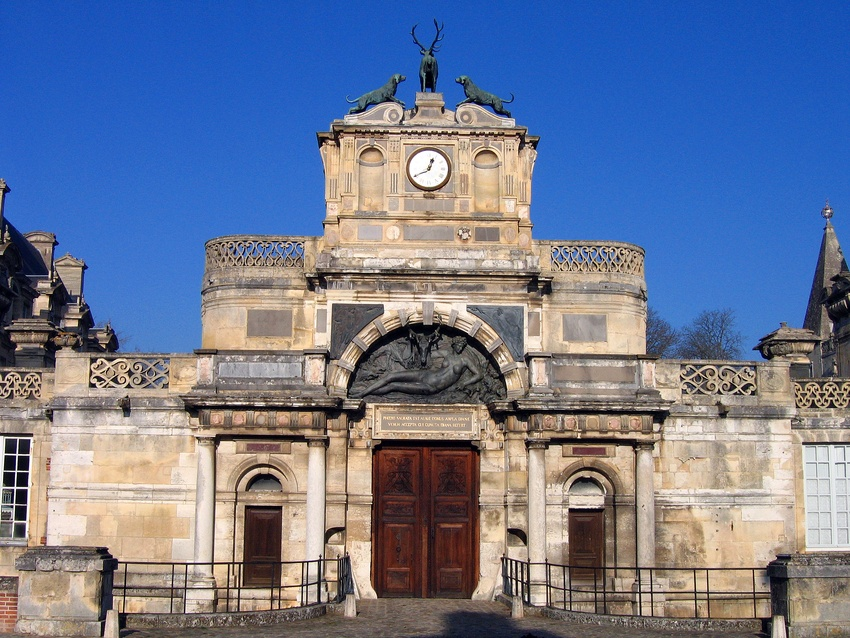
Portal to the Château d'Anet, built for Diane de Poitiers

On April 3, 1548 he was a named architect of the King by Henry II. For a period of eleven years, he supervised all of the King's architectural projects, with the exception of changes to the Louvre, which were planned by another royal architect, Pierre Lescot. His major projects included the Château de St Maur-des-Fossés, the Château d'Anet, the Château de Chenonceau in the Loire Valley; the royal Château de Madrid in the Bois de Boulogne; the Château de Vincennes, and major modifications to the Palace of Fontainebleau.

He also made a reputation as a writer and theorist, and as an innovator in building techniques. He invented a new system for making the essential wooden frameworks for constructing stone buildings, called charpente à petits bois, which was quicker and less expensive than previous methods and used much less wood. He demonstrated it before the King in 1555, and put it to work in construction at the new royal Château de Montceaux and at the royal hunting lodge La Muette in the Forest of Saint-Germain-en-Laye.

=== Out of favor - architectural theorist (1559-1563) ===
The death of Henry II of France on July 10, 1559 suddenly left him without a patron and at the mercy of rival architects who resented his success and his style. Two days later, on 10 July, he was dismissed from his official posts, and replaced by an Italian artist and architect, Francesco Primaticcio, whose work was much in fashion. He had joined a religious order, and decided to turn his attention to meditation, scholarship and writing. He made another trip to Rome to inspect the new works of Michelangelo. Beginning in 1565 wrote the first volume of a work on architectural theory, which was scientific and philosophical. It was published in 1567, and was followed by new editions after his death in 1576, 1626 and 1648.

=== Royal architect again (1563-1570) ===
Under Charles IX and Catherine de Medici, he returned to royal favor. He was employed on the enlargement of the Chateau of Saint Maur (1563) and, along with Jean Bullant, on additions to the Tuileries Palace (1564). He died in Paris in 1570, while this project was underway.

=== Reputation ===
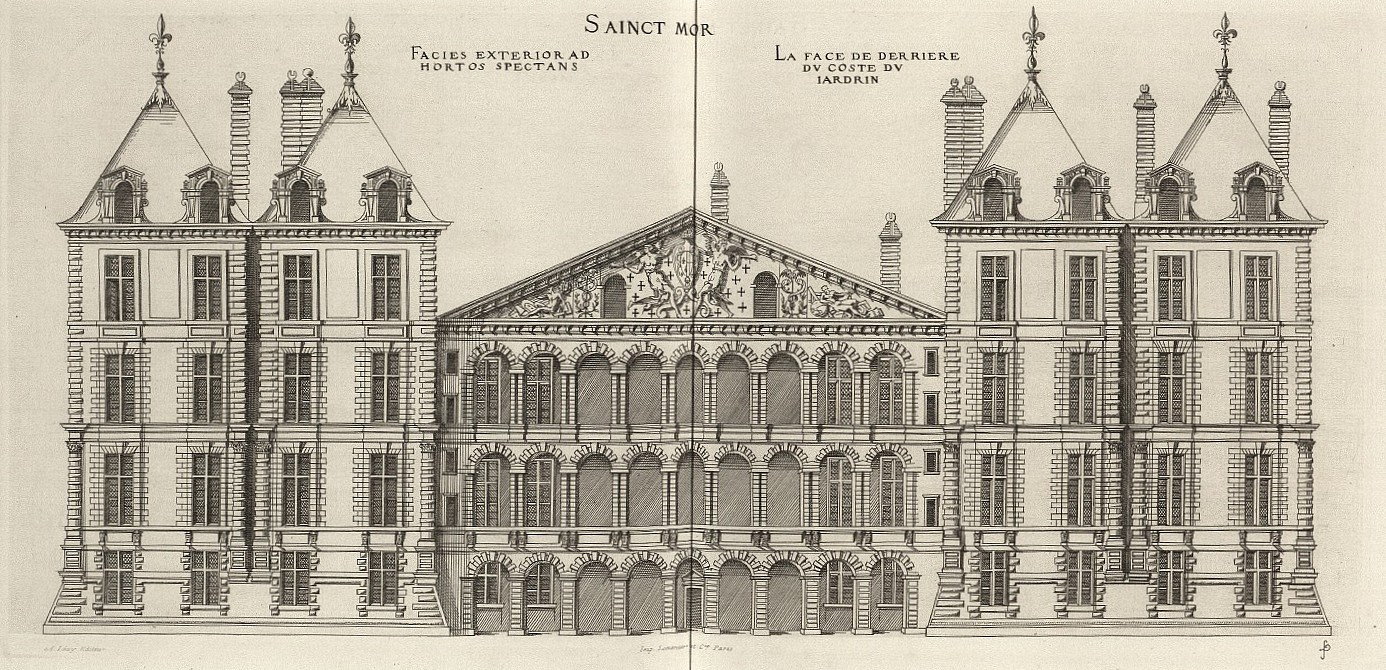
Garden facade of the Chateau de Saint-Maur (1541, demolished 1796)

In the 17th century, during the period of Louis XIV style that followed his death, his reputation suffered. The grand stairway that he built at the Tuileries Palace was demolished in 1664, as was his Château de Saint-Léger in 1668, to make way for classical structures. In 1683, he was denounced by François Blondel of the Royal Academy for his "villainous Gothic ornaments" and his "petty manner". Nonetheless, his two major theoretical works on construction and design continued to be important textbooks, and were regularly republished and read.

His reputation rose again in the 18th century, through the writings of Dezallier d'Argenville, who wrote in 1787 that he had "abandoned the Gothic covering in order to redress French architecture in the style Ancient Greece." D'Argenville wrote the first biography and catalog of works. Though few of his building survived to be studied carefully, later important academic works on de l'Orme were written in the 19th and 20th centuries by art historians including H. Clouzot and Anthony Blunt.

One of De l'Orme's primary accomplishments was to change the way architects trained and studied. He insisted that architects needed formal education in classical architecture, as well as in geometry and astronomy and the sciences, but also needed practical experience in construction. He himself was an accomplished scholar of ancient Greek and Roman architecture, as well as a humanist scholar. He argued that architects needed to be able to design and manage every aspect of the building, from the volumes to the lambris to adding up the cost, making detailed three-dimensional drawings of vaults, judging if wood was dry enough, and knowing to stop digging the foundation when the first sand was encountered. He had scorn for those architects who could design a facade but had no knowledge actual construction. His opponents scorned him for his background as the son of a masonry contractor. He was referred to by Bernard Palissy as "The god of the stone masons", which deeply offended him.

His other major accomplishment was to resist the tendency to simply copy Italian architectural styles; he traveled and studied in Italy, and borrowed much, but he always added a distinctly French look to each of his projects.

== Works attributed to de l'Orme ==
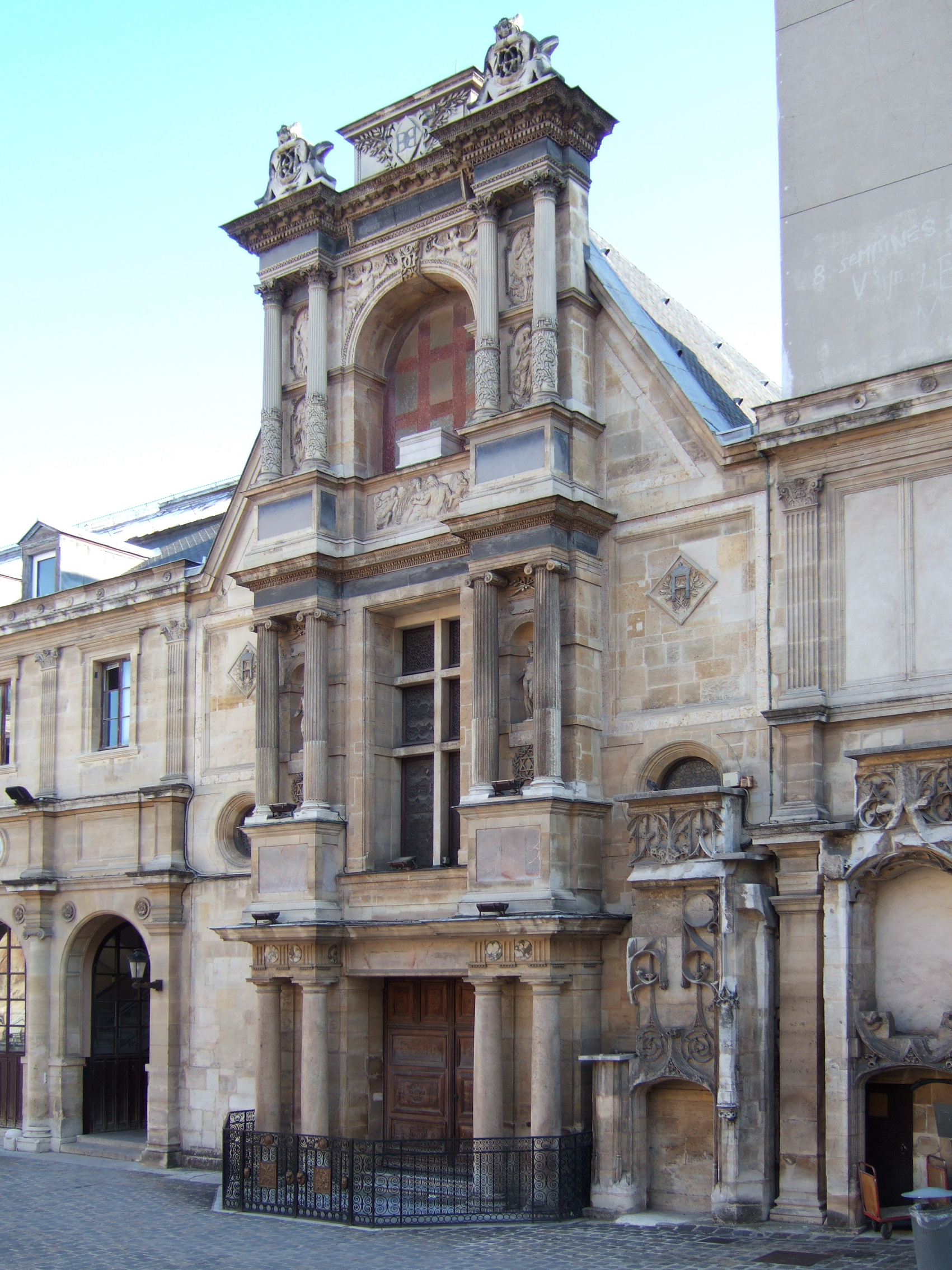
Court facade of the Château d'Anet, now serving as the facade of the chapel at the Ecole Nationale des Beaux-Arts in Paris

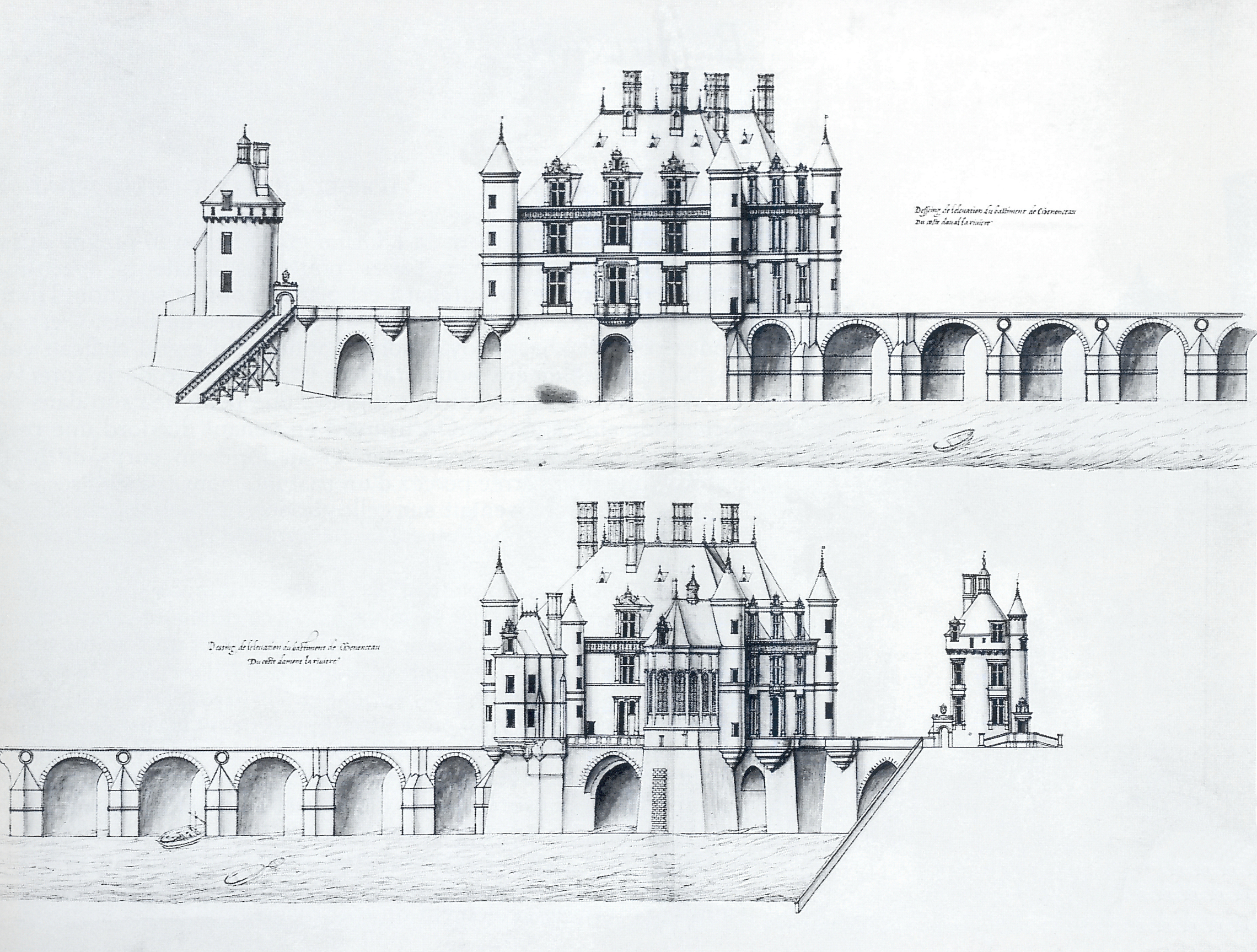
The bridge over the Loire of the Chateau de Chenonceau was designed and built by de l'Orme (drawing by Jacques Androuet du Cerceau)

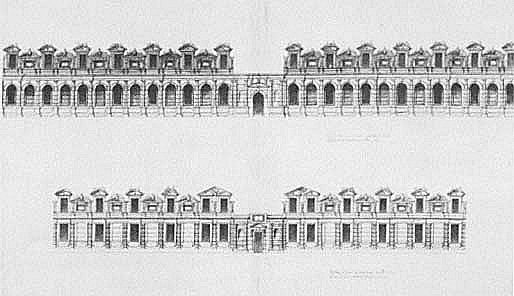
Elevations of the de l'Orme wing of the Tuileries Palace (drawing by Jacques Androuet du Cerceau)

The first major building of de l'Orme was the Château of Saint Maur (1541), built for the Cardinal Jean du Bellay, whom de l'Orme had met during his time in Rome. Its plan showed the influence of the Italian villas; and, like the Italian buildings, it was decorated with frescoes.

Much of his work has disappeared, but his fame remains. He was an ardent humanist and student of the antique, he yet vindicated resolutely the French tradition in opposition to Italian tendencies; he was a man of independent mind and a vigorous originality. His masterpiece was the Château d'Anet (1552–1559), built for Diane de Poitiers, the plans of which are preserved in Jacques Androuet du Cerceau's Plus excellens bastimens de France, though only part of the building remains. His designs for the Tuileries (also given by Androuet du Cerceau), begun by Catherine de' Medici in 1565, were magnificent. His work is also seen at Chenonceau and other famous châteaux; and his tomb of Francis I at Saint Denis Basilica remains a perfect specimen of his art.

The most easily viewed work of de l'Orme in Paris is the court facade of the Chateau d'Anet, which was moved to Paris after a major portion of the chateau was demolished, to illustrate for students the major works of the French Renaissance. It is attached to the front wall of the chapel of the Ecole des Beaux-Arts, and is visible from Rue Bonaparte.

== Partial list of works ==
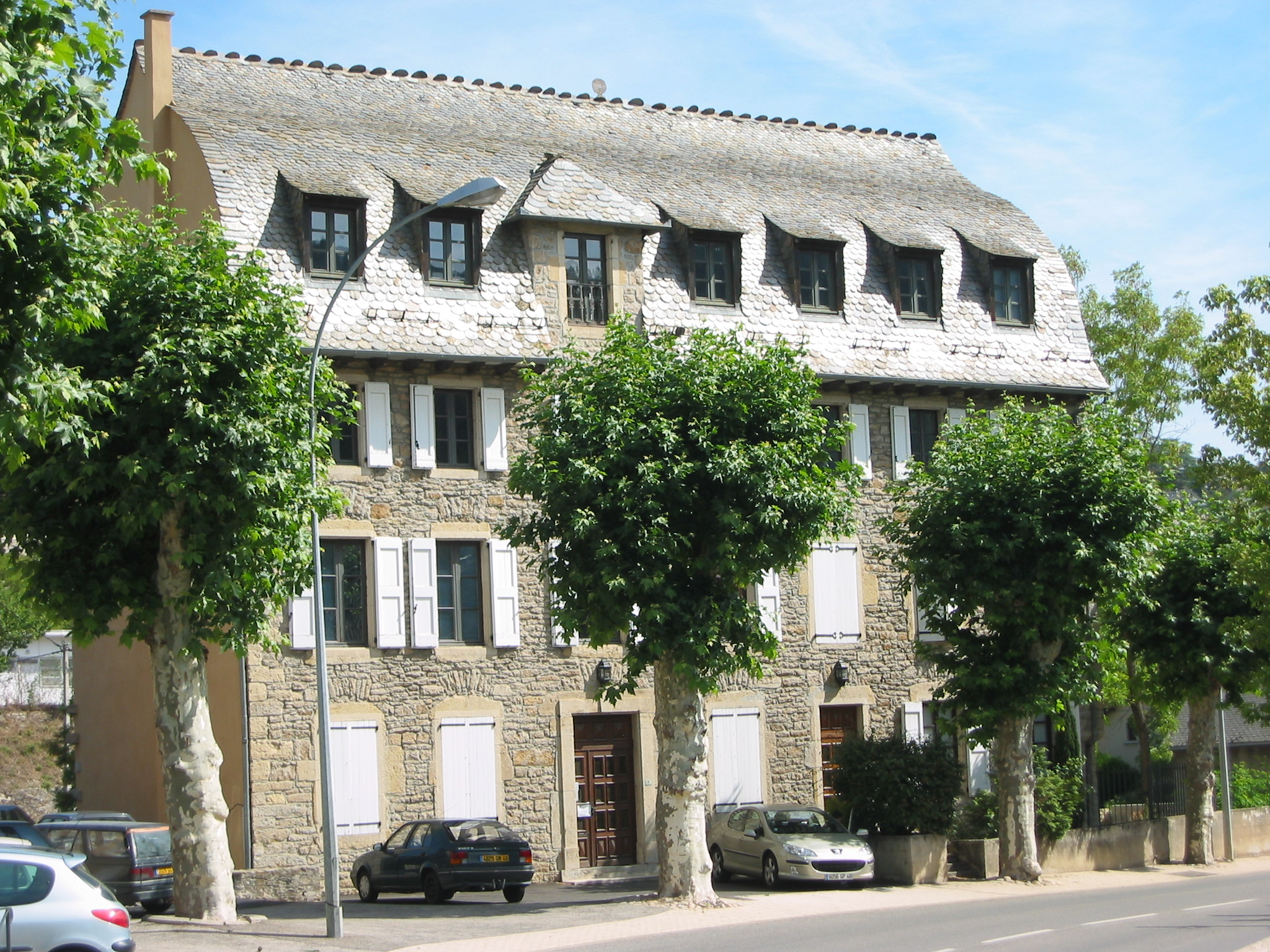
de l'Orme is credited with popularizing this roof form now sometimes called a de l'Orme roof

- Château de Saint-Maur (1541), demolished in 1796
- Tomb of François Ie in the Basilica of Saint-Denis, Paris (1547)
- Château d'Anet (1547-1555), built for Diane de Poitiers. Only one wing remains.
- Plans of the Chapel of Saint-Éloi, Paris (1550-1566), (Long attributed, but not documented. Only a portion of the facade remains)
- Attribution du château d'Acquigny
- Facade of the residence of the Vicomte of the Duchy of Uzès (attributed)
- Completion of Sainte-Chapelle at the Château de Vincennes (1552)
- Château de Villers-Cotterêts, southern portion( 1547-1559)
- Chapel of the Château of Villers-Cotterêts (1552-1553)
- Royal Château of Saint-Léger-en-Yvelines (demolished)
- Château de Meudon (attributed)
- Château de Montceaux
- Château de Thoiry (1560s)
- The bridge upon which the Château de Chenonceau is constructed
- Portions of the Louvre
- Portions of the new Chateau of Saint-Germain-en-Laye
- Portal of Château d'Écouen, now the National Museum of the French Renaissance (mid 16th century). The wing he designed was destroyed in 1787, but vestiges are displayed inside the Chateau.
- Roofs of the towers of the Château de Bonnemare.

== Cultural depictions ==
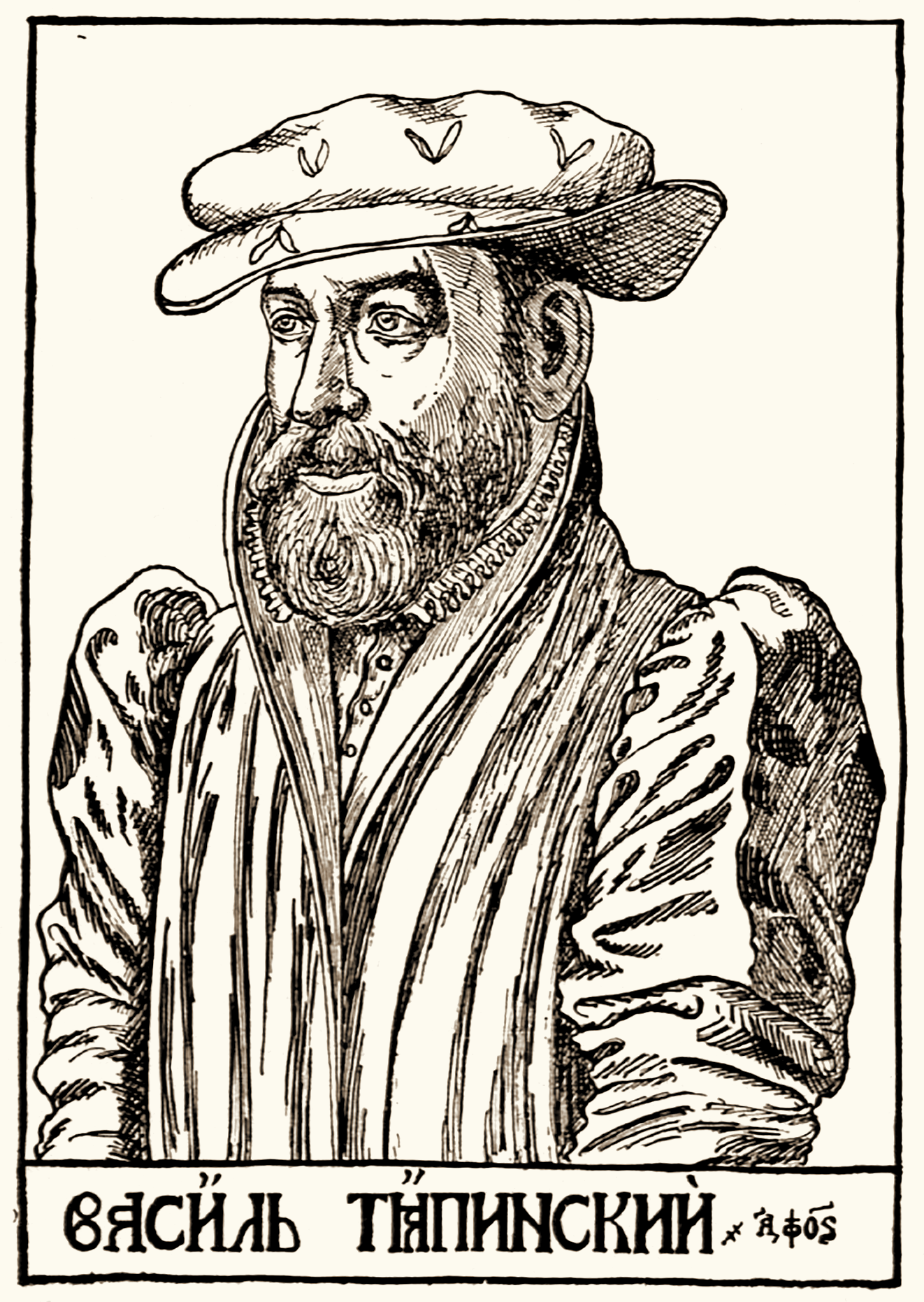
Portrait of Wasyl Ciapinski

A 1626 engraved portrait of Philibert de l'Orme was later reused in 1919 by Belarusian bibliophile Ramuald Ziamkievič as the basis for a purported 16th-century portrait of the Belarusian humanist Wasyl Ciapiński. This adapted image circulated widely in Belarusian publications throughout the 20th century, despite its origin in de l'Orme’s engraving.

== See also ==
- Catherine de' Medici's building projects
- Basilica of the National Shrine of the Assumption of the Blessed Virgin Mary, influenced by Philibert Delorme

== Bibliography ==
- Boudon, Françoise (1999). "De l'Orme" in Dictionnaire des Architectes. Paris: Encyclopaedia Universalis. ISBN 2-226-10952-8.
- Blunt, Anthony (1958). Philibert de l'Orme. London: A. Zwemmer. OCLC 554569. ISBN 9780302002629.
- Catholic Encyclopedia article
- (in French) Philibert de l'Orme
- Hanser, David A. (2006). Architecture of France. Westport, Connecticut: Greenwood Press. ISBN 9780313319020.
- Hoffmann, Volker (1996). "L'Orme [Delorme], Philibert de" in The Dictionary of Art, 34 volumes, edited by Jane Turner. New York: Grove. ISBN 9781884446009. Also at Oxford Art Online (article updated 26 November 2003).
- Lemerle, F. & Y. Pauwels (2016). Philibert De L'Orme (1514-1570). Un architecte dans l'histoire: Arts - Sciences - Techniques (= Études Renaissantes 17). Turnhout: Brepols. ISBN 978-2-503-56560-6.
- Pérouse de Montclos, Jean-Marie (2000). Philibert De l'Orme : Architecte du roi (1514–1570). Paris: Mengès. ISBN 9782856204085.
- Potié, Philippe (1996). Philibert de L'Orme : Figures de la pensées constructive. Marseille: Parenthèses. ISBN 9782863640708.
