= Bible translations into Belarusian =

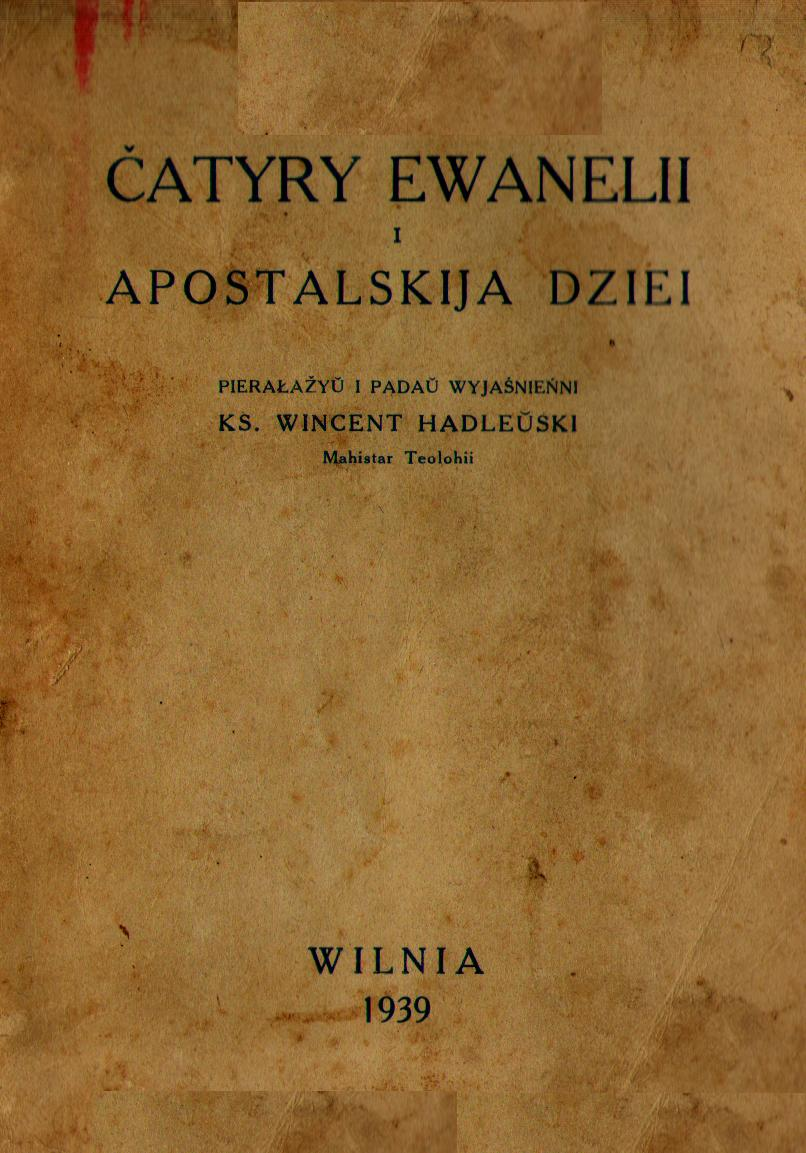
„Čatyry Ewanelii“ (Gospels and Acts translated by Vincent Hadleŭski), 1939

The first translation into Belarusian was by Francysk Skaryna. He printed his first book titled The Psalter, in the Old Belarusian recension of Church Slavonic on August 6, 1517, in Prague. He continued his printing work in Vilnius. The culmination of his life's work was a printing of the Bible in the Old Belarusian recension of Church Slavonic. From 1517 to 1519 he printed 23 books of the Bible. Belarusian bible was the first translation in an Eastern Slavic language and one of the first among European languages.

In 2000 a translation from an Old-Slavic Bible was executed by well known Belarusian slavist and translator Vasil Syargeevich Syomukha, with the help of Metropolitan of Belarusian Autocephalous Orthodox Church Nickolaj and missionary of Global Missionary Ministries George Rapetsky (Canada).

- Francysk Skaryna, 1517
- Luka Dzekuc-Malej, 1926, 1931
- Anton Luckievich, 1931
- Vasil Syargeevich Syomukha, 2003
- George Rapetsky, Canadian, 2003
