= Arciom Viaryha-Dareŭski =

Belarusian poet, playwright and folklorist (1816–1884)

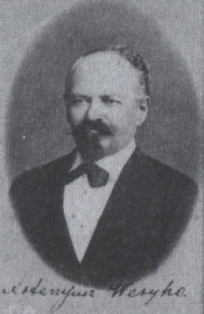
- Portrait of Arciom Viaryha-Dareŭski
- Born: 23 November 1816; Kubličy, Lepel Uyezd, Vitebsk Governorate, Russian Empire
- Died: 1884; Siberia, Russian Empire
- Occupation(s): Poet, playwright, publicist, folklorist
- Known for: One of the founders of modern Belarusian literature, the "Album of Viaryha-Dareŭski"

Arciom Viaryha-Dareŭski (Арцём Вяры́га-Дарэ́ўскі; Artemiusz Weryha-Darewski; 23 November 1816 – 1884) was a Belarusian poet, playwright, publicist, and folklorist. He is considered one of the founders of modern Belarusian literature.

He used the pseudonyms and cryptonyms Artemiusz, A.W., Białoruska Duda, D...a B., and D-da B..

== Biography ==
Viaryha-Dareŭski belonged to an ancient but impoverished noble family. He was baptized into the Catholic Church.

His father was an inspector of weights and measures in Kubličy. His mother died after childbirth. Arciom's childhood was spent in the Liudvinava estate near Dzisna. After graduating from the Zabel Gymnasium (in Valyncy, now Verkhnyadzvinsk District), he served in the Vitebsk Temporary Commission for the Revision of the Activities of the Vitebsk Governorate Noble Assembly (1836–1844). In the mid-1840s, he acquired the Stajki estate near Vitebsk and married. He served in various institutions in Vitebsk. In 1852, he received the rank of Collegiate Assessor.

In 1861–1862, he participated in patriotic demonstrations in Vitebsk, for which he became an object of close surveillance by the gendarmes. In 1863, he was one of the leaders of the armed uprising (January Uprising) in the Vitebsk region. He was arrested on 6 May 1863 and spent almost two years under investigation in the Vitebsk prison. Initially sentenced to life katorga (penal labor), his sentence was commuted to 8 years of penal labor. In 1865, he was exiled to Eastern Siberia (to a salt works in Usolye-Sibirskoye). From 1868, he lived in exile in Irkutsk. He died in Siberia; his burial place is unknown.

== Cultural activity ==
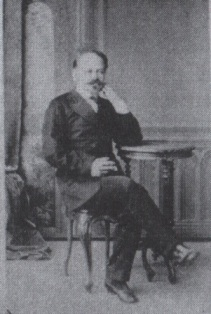
Arciom Viaryha-Dareŭski

Viaryha-Dareŭski devoted much effort and time to cultural and educational activities, striving to organize folk schools, a theater, libraries, and reading rooms in the Vitebsk region. In the 1850s, he organized a public library in Vitebsk. He collected Belarusian folklore and sent correspondence to the newspapers Kurier Wileński (Vilna), Słowo (Saint Petersburg), and the magazine Ruch muzyczny (Warsaw).

He became known as the author of poems, conversational poems, and dramatic works that circulated in manuscripts: the poem "Akhulgo" (thematically linked to the struggle of Chechen highlanders led by Shamil), the drama "Pride" (Гордасць), and the comedies "Greed" (Хцівасць) and "The 4th Sin — Anger" (Грэх 4-ы — гнеў). He was the first to translate Adam Mickiewicz's poem Konrad Wallenrod into Belarusian. His Belarusian works were not published due to censorship conditions, and the manuscripts have not been found. During his lifetime, only one book was published in Polish, Gawędka o Swojaku (1858), under the pseudonym Białoruska Duda (Belarusian Duda/Bagpipe). His trip to Vilna in 1858, where he met with prominent cultural figures, had significant public resonance.

At that time, the famous "Album of Viaryha-Dareŭski" (1858–1863) was started. It became a unique literary and public almanac, where entries were left by Władysław Syrokomla, Vinces Karatynski, Adam Kirkor, Vincent Dunin-Marcinkievič, Aliaksandr Rypinski, and Jalehi Pranciš Vul, among others. Viaryha-Dareŭski authored a rhymed improvisation "To the Lithuanians who signed my Album as a keepsake" (a copy has survived).

On 23 April 1859, Jalehi Pranciš Vul (Franciszek Karaffa-Korbut) wrote his Belarusian poem "To the Piper Arciom from a Peasant from the Dvina Banks" (К дудару Арцёму ад наддзвінскага мужыка) in Dareŭski's album, calling Arciom Viaryha-Dareŭski a "dudar" (piper/bagpiper) in the folk tradition.

The opinion expressed in scholarly literature that Arciom Viaryha-Dareŭski is the author of the poem Taras na Parnasie has not been confirmed by research.

== Bibliography ==
- Gawędka o Swojaku przez Białoruską Dudę. Mohylew; Wilno, 1858.
- Беларуская літаратура ХІХ ст.: Хрэстаматыя [Belarusian Literature of the 19th Century: Anthology]. Мн., 1988.
- Пачынальнікі: З гісторыка-літаратурных матэрыялаў XIX ст.' [Founders: From Historical and Literary Materials of the 19th Century]. / уклад. Г. В. Кіселёў. — 2-е выд. — Мн., 2003. — С. 214—293.
