= Alexander Rypinski =

Polish-Belarusian writer and translator (1811–1900)

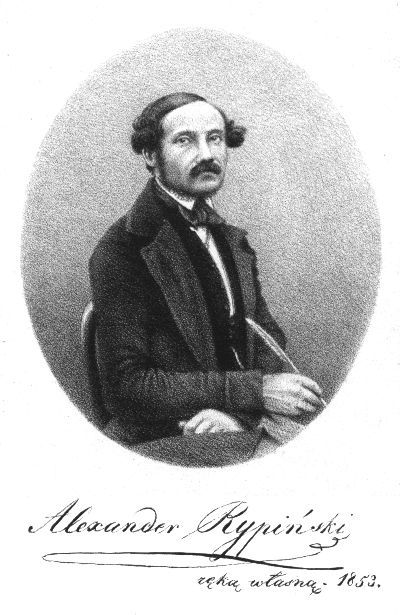
- Born: September 10, 1809; Kukaviačyna estate near Vitsebsk
- Died: November 8, 1886 (aged 77)
- Occupations: Belarusian and Polish poet, translator and folklorist, participant in the November Uprising
- Known for: the first author and publisher to use the “Short U” (Ŭ) letter in the Belarusian language (Latin alphabet)

Alexander Rypinski (Belarusian: Аляксандар Рыпінскі; 10 September 1809 - 8 November 1886) was a Polish poet, translator and folklorist, participant in the November Uprising.

Rypinski was born into a Polonised Ruthenian noble family on the Kukaviačyna estate near Viciebsk (nowadays the village of Kukaviačyna in Viciebsk district of Belarus). The family adhered to the Greek rite until the late 17th century.

== Early years ==
Rypinski grew up in Staiki near Viciebsk, on his grandfather's estate, where he learned Belarusian folk songs and fairy tales. He acquired interest in poetry and translation at school and wrote his first poem (in Polish) at the age of 16. Two years later he translated A. Pushkin's "Mermaid" into Polish.

After graduating from a Viciebsk gymnasium in 1829-30 he enrolled in a military school in Dinaburg (now Daugavpils, Latvia). In Dinaburg he became acquainted with W. Küchelbecker, a Russian-German Romantic poet and Decembrist.

== November Uprising and exile in Paris ==
Rypinski took part in the November Uprising of 1830–31. When the uprising was suppressed by the Russian troops, he fled to Prussia and then to Paris where he lived until 1846.

He was elected a member of the French Academy of Industry, Agriculture, Crafts and Trade and opened an art shop. On 21 November 1839, at a meeting of the Polish Literary Society in Paris, he read the first report on Belarusian ethnography and folklore, and in 1840, on the basis of his own lectures, published the book “Belarus”. The Parisian period includes a close acquaintance with Adam Mickiewicz, which was based on the unity of civic and aesthetic ideals.

He prepared for publication his memoirs from the time of the November Uprising (fragments of which were published in Paris in 1836 - "The Uprising of Vileіka, Zavilеіка and Dzisna districts").

== Life in London ==
In 1846 Rypinski moved to London, where he engaged in publishing and creative activities, teaching languages, mathematics and drawing - becoming “one of the most versatile Belarusian expatriates living in England during the 19th century”.

He established himself as an artist, designed his own books and became one of the pioneers of photography. In 1852 he founded a printing house in Tottenham, London where he published collections of his Polish poems "Poetic Works" (1853) and "Sergeant-Philosopher" (1854). Within the collections he included his Belarusian romantic ballad Niačyścik ("The Little Devil") which was also published in a separate edition in Poznań in 1853. The well-known poem "Play, play, little boy ..." by Belarusian poet Paŭliuk Bahrym was also published in Rypinski's printing house.

== Return home ==
In 1859, the Tsar granted amnesty to participants of the November Uprising. Rypinski abandoned his application for naturalisation as a British subject and returned to his family's Kukaviačyna estate where he lived under police surveillance. He worked on the history of Belarusian literature and wrote a number of biographies of Belarusian writers, including those of Jan Barščeŭski, Vincent Reut and Francišak Rysinski.

== Death ==
Rypinski died on 8 November 1886. He was buried in the family cemetery of the Zablocki family.

== Legacy ==
Because of his work Niačyścik ("The Little Devil") Rypinsky is considered “one of the creators of the genre of ballads in [Belarusian] literature.” The ballad “about a lax farmer carried off by the devil for making sausages in Lent” was written in 1853.

Rypinski is known for his efforts to streamline the norms of Belarusian orthoepy. He was also the first author and publisher to use the “short u” (Ŭ) letter in the Belarusian language (Latin alphabet) – until then there had been no single standard of how that sound should be conveyed in writing. This letter was later adopted in the Belarusian Cyrillic alphabet too.
