= Oktoikh ensemble =

Oktoikh is an ensemble of church and secular music in Chelyabinsk, Russia. It was created in 1988 from singers of Russian Orthodox Churches of the Chelyabinsk Diocese. Its director is Vyacheslav Usoltsev, a Meritorious Artist of the Russian Federation.

In addition to Russian Orthodox and secular music, the ensemble performs historical and modern sacred music of other religious confessions, including Catholic, Protestant, Jewish, and Muslim. They sing both regular sacred music and songs of their own composition.

Everyone in the ensemble is bearded, which has become a public image of the ensemble.

== Discography ==
- 1991-1992: Mother of the World (“Матерь Мира”), Melodiya, a chorus cycle dedicated to the paintings of Nicholas Roerich (together with composer Yuri Vazhenin)
- 1993: God with Us! (“С нами Бог!”), Melodiya, Russian church music
