= Romualdo =

Given name

Romualdo is a given name. Notable people with the name include:

- Agustín Romualdo Álvarez Rodríguez, OFMCap (1923–2011), Spanish Capuchin and bishop of the Roman Catholic Church
- Alejandro Romualdo (1926–2008), Peruvian poet of the 20th century
- Pedro Romualdo (born 1935), Filipino politician
- Peniche Everton Romualdo (born 1979), retired Brazilian professional footballer
- Xavier Jesus Romualdo, Filipino politician
- Romualdo Arppi Filho (born 1939), retired football referee from Brazil
- Romualdo Ghiglione (1891–1940), Italian gymnast who competed in the 1920 Summer Olympics
- Romualdo Marenco (1841–1907), Italian composer primarily noted for ballet music
- Romualdo Pacheco (1831–1899), American politician and diplomat
- Romualdo Palacio González, Spanish general and governor of Puerto Rico in 1887

== See also ==
- Estadio Romualdo Bueso, football stadium in La Esperanza, Honduras
- Rancho Huerta de Romualdo, 117-acre Mexican land grant in present-day San Luis Obispo County, California
- Romualdo Del Bianco Foundation, Italian non-profit organization established in Florence, Italy, in 1998 by Paolo Del Bianco
- Romuald
