= Francysk Skaryna =

Belarusian translator and printer (died 1551/1552)

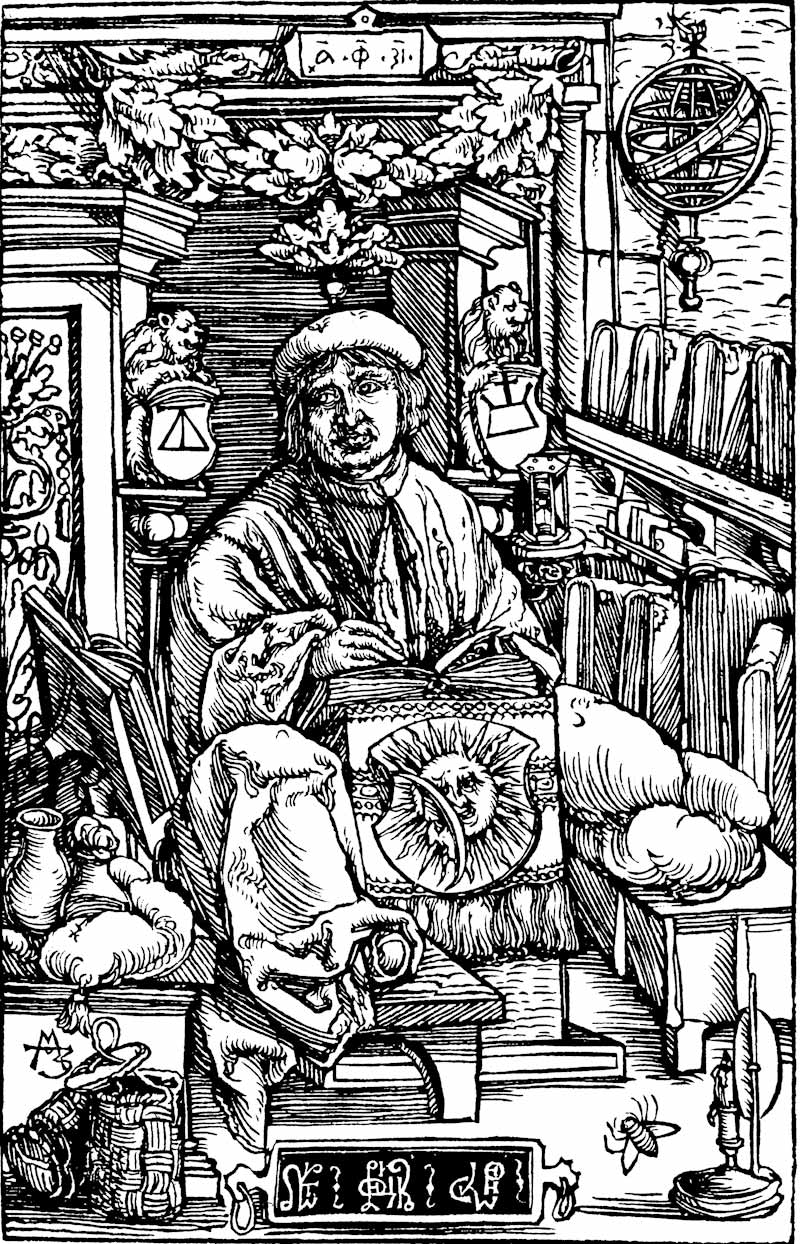
- Born: Francišak Skaryna c. 1470–1490; Polotsk, Grand Duchy of Lithuania
- Died: 1551/29 January 1552; Prague, Bohemia
- Occupations: Humanist, physician and translator
- Known for: One of the first book printers in the Grand Duchy of Lithuania and in all of Eastern Europe

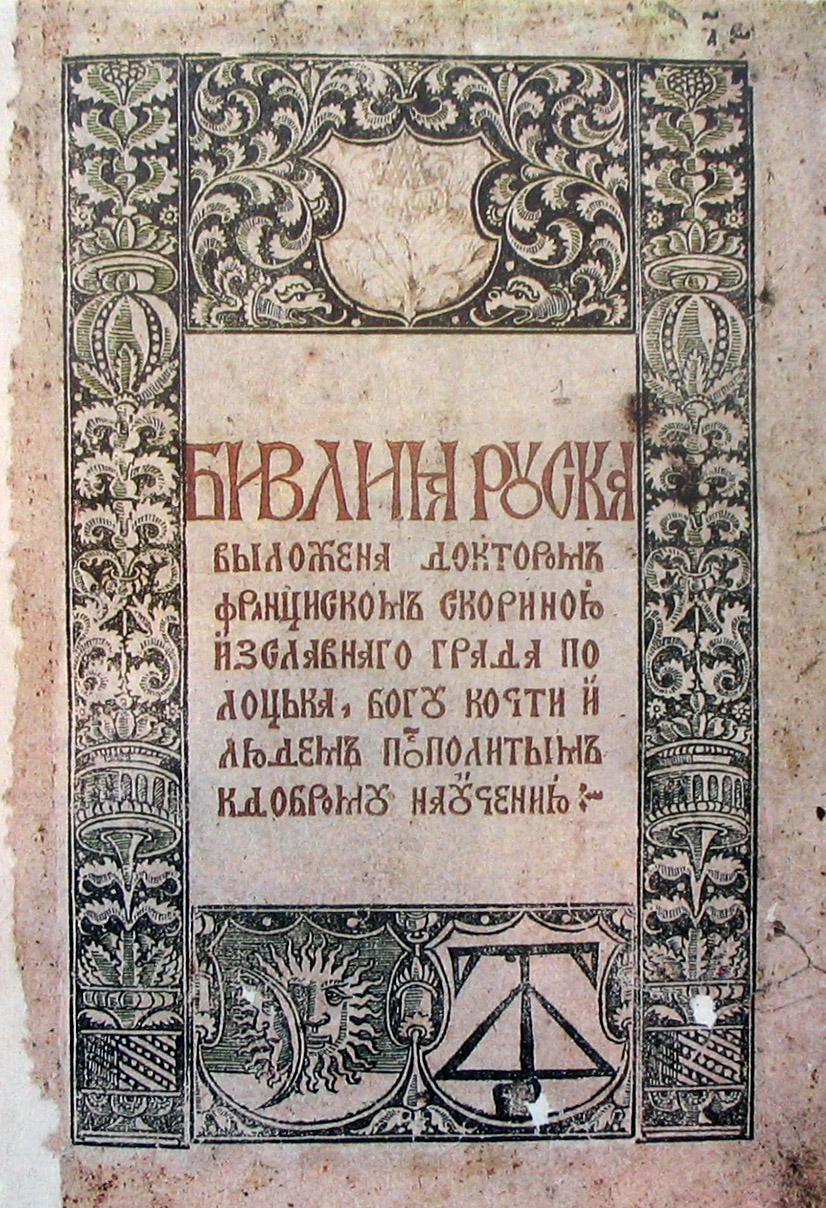
Title page of Skaryna's Bible

Francysk Skaryna (alternative transcriptions of his name: Francišak Skaryna or Francysk Skaryna; Latin: Franciscus Scorina, Belarusian: Францыск (Францішак) Скарына [franˈt͡sɨsk skaˈrɨna]; Polish: Franciszek Skaryna, Czech: František Skorina; c. 1470–1490 – 1551/29 January 1552) was a Belarusian humanist, physician and translator. He is known to be one of the first book printers in the Grand Duchy of Lithuania and in all of Eastern Europe, laying the groundwork for the development of the Belarusian redaction (izvod) of the Church Slavonic language.

== Early life and education ==
Skaryna was born into a wealthy family from Polotsk (now in Belarus), which was then a major trade and manufacturing center of the Grand Duchy of Lithuania. His father, Luka Skaryna, was a merchant, who dealt with someone known as Doronya Ivanov, from Velikiye Luki. Skaryna's older brother, Ivan, was also a merchant. The brothers owned property, possibly ancestral, in Polotsk.

The date of birth is unknown. Usually it has been suggested that he was born somewhere between 1495 and 1490. In 2019 Ilja Lemeškin argued that Skaryna was born in 1470. The year 1490 is often proposed based on the assumption that he was 14 when he came to study in Kraków in 1504. The date is an upper boundary; while new students younger than 14 were rare, older ones were not unusual, and Skaryna could have started his studies at the age of 18 or even older. Mikalai Shchakatsikhin suggested that the overlapping sun and moon on Skaryna's personal emblem indicates that he was born around the time of the 1486 solar eclipse, which was observed in Polotsk.

It is believed that he received his primary education in Polotsk and possibly in Vilnius. In 1504, Skaryna is recorded as a student at Jagiellonian University. In 1506, he graduated with a Bachelor of Arts degree. In 1512, after passing all required tests, he received a doctorate in medicine at the University of Padua in Italy. Records suggest that he requested to take his examination in Padua but had not studied in the city. Earlier, he obtained an "artium doctor" degree, but the exact date and place are unknown.

== Later life ==
Skaryna arrived in Prague by 1517. According to one hypothesis, he had been a student at Charles University in Prague, but there is no documentary evidence of this. In the same year, he rented a printing house from a merchant named Severin in Prague and started publishing a new translation of the Bible with his own prefaces.

On 6 August 1517, his first edition, The Psalter, was released. "The Psalter" comprises nearly all of the biblical books of Holy Scripture. He released new books periodically over the next few months (10 September, 6 October, 5 December, 2 January 1518, 9 January, and 19 January). Then, on 10 August 1518, he published four books at the same time. The culmination of his life's work was printing a translation of the Bible in twenty-three books from 1517 to 1519.

In 1522, Skaryna opened the first printing house in Vilnius. He published "The Little Travel Book", followed by "Apostol" in 1525. "Apostol" was released in the same order as it is used in Orthodox worship now.

In the late 1520s or early 1530s, he visited Moscow. He wished to distribute his books in Moscow but was unsuccessful.

Skaryna married Margarita, the widow of a Vilnius city councilor. In 1529, following his brother's death, he went to Poznań and obtained a share of Ivan's property. In 1530, he moved with his wife to Königsberg, but they soon returned to Vilnius.

In 1532, he worked as a doctor and secretary to John, Bishop of Vilnius. After two years, creditors of his late brother Ivan considered Skaryna as the brother's primary heir, and imprisoned him in Poznań. He was there for several months. Roman Skaryna, Ivan's son and Francysk's nephew, actively helped his uncle, meeting with King Sigismund I. When Skaryna was released, he sent a complaint letter with a counterclaim against the creditors to the King. In response to the letter, he was awarded two royal privilege certificates (dated 21 and 25 November 1532). These certificates exempted him from the jurisdiction of all authorities except the King.

The last information about Skaryna is mentioned in the archives of 1534. He moved from Vilnius to Prague. He probably served in the royal garden in Prague until his death. According to some theories, Skaryna taught as a professor at Charles University in Prague. He is presumed to have died sometime between 1551 and January 29, 1552.

In 1552, his son Simeon Rus Skaryna received a royal certificate, according to which he, as the sole heir, was given all of the property of his father. The property included manuscripts, letters, and books.

== Religion ==
Image from "Song of Songs" of Francysk Skaryna, 1519

It is not known for certain whether Skaryna was Catholic or Orthodox. His name is Catholic, but it is often suggested that he changed it before entering the university. A single copy of a document in which he is called Georgius Franciscus instead of just Franciscus gave rise to a theory that Georgius was his original name; today, however, it is mostly accepted to be a scribe's error (the presumed correct reading being egregius Franciscus, 'venerable Francysk'). In any case, the once popular theory that he changed his name from Georgius to Franciscus to be able to enter the university is unsupported by evidence: the name Georgius was equally popular among Catholics and Orthodox Christians in the region, and in Skaryna's year there were more students named Georgius than Franciscus in Kraków.

In 1552, after Skaryna's death (and long after his final departure from the country), King Sigismund August mentioned in a letter that a man from his country had printed a translation of the Bible and had tried to sell his edition in Moscow, but the books had been burned there because they had been produced 'by a subject of the Roman Church'. The books mentioned in the letter are most probably Skaryna's.

== Publishing activities ==
Skaryna devoted his life to the publication of biblical texts. He sought to make the Bible more accessible to ordinary people and to write it in an accessible language. Skaryna also composed prefaces to his editions, in which he emphasised that the purpose of his publishing activities was to help ordinary people 'become acquainted with wisdom and science'. He contributed to the development of the Belarusian literary language. This Bible became the second printed Bible in the Slavic world, following the publication of a Czech edition.

=== Books ===
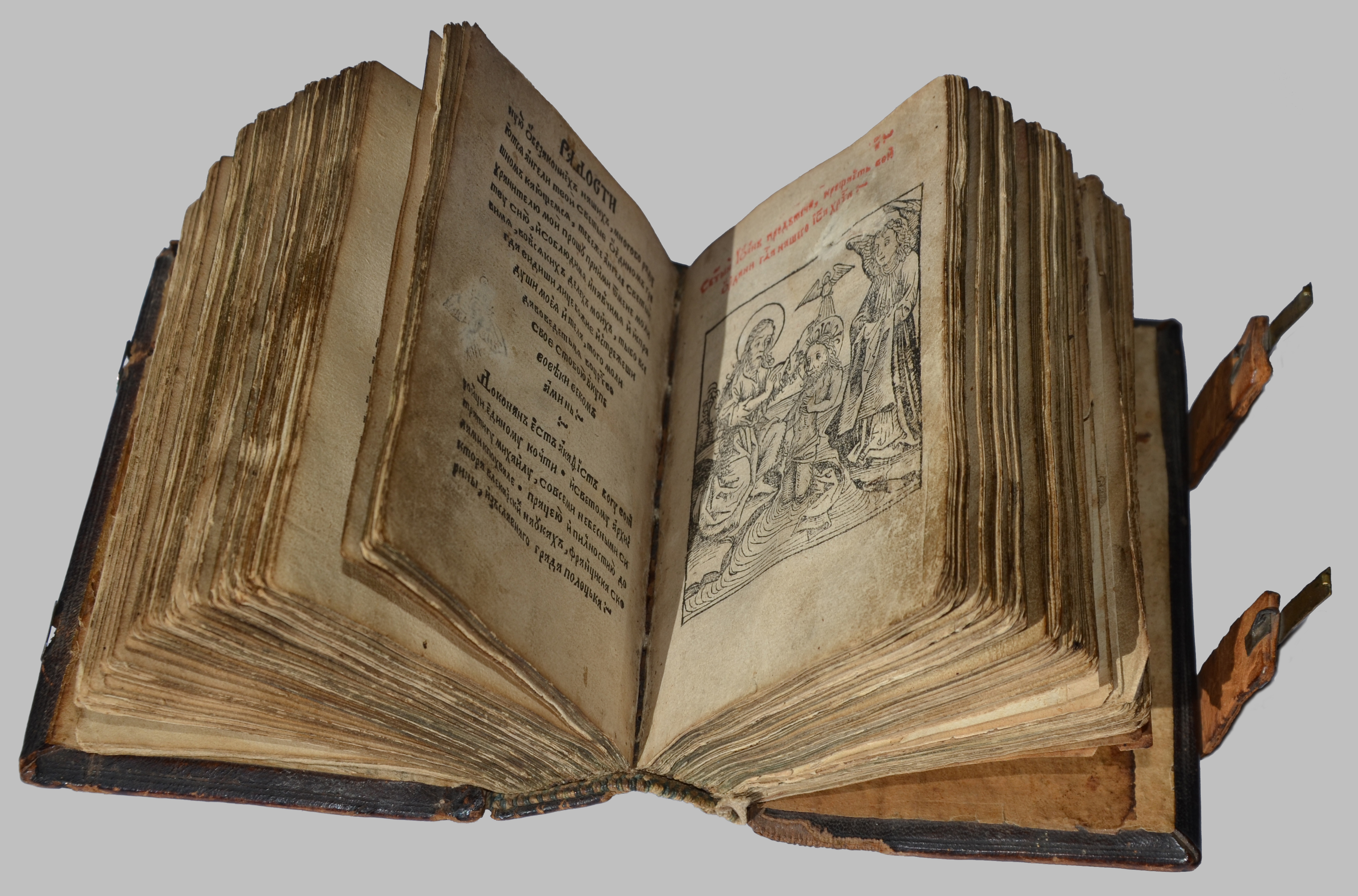
The Little Traveller's Book (Ruthenian: Малая подорожная книжка), printed in Vilnius in 1522

In 1517, Skaryna started his publishing career in Prague. He printed his Psalter, and then twenty-two books of the Old Testament under the shared name Biblia Ruska. His books differed from the Western European printed Bibles of that time, in that they were all published in the quarto format. Skaryna's editions of the Bible were printed in the Church Slavonic language with many Ruthenian words. Belarusian linguists can also identify the influence of the Polish and Czech languages.

Skaryna's books contributed to the development of the Belarusian izvod of the Church Slavonic language.

Skaryna's Bible challenged the existing rules of that time. It contains text from the publisher, his comments, forewords, and afterwords. In addition, it contains prints with his image. It is the only such case in the history of the publication of Bibles in Eastern Europe.

All of Skaryna's editions are very rare today, especially those published in Vilnius. Copies are stored in libraries in Minsk, Moscow, Saint Petersburg, Kyiv, Vilnius, Lviv, London, Prague, Copenhagen, and Kraków.

== Legacy ==
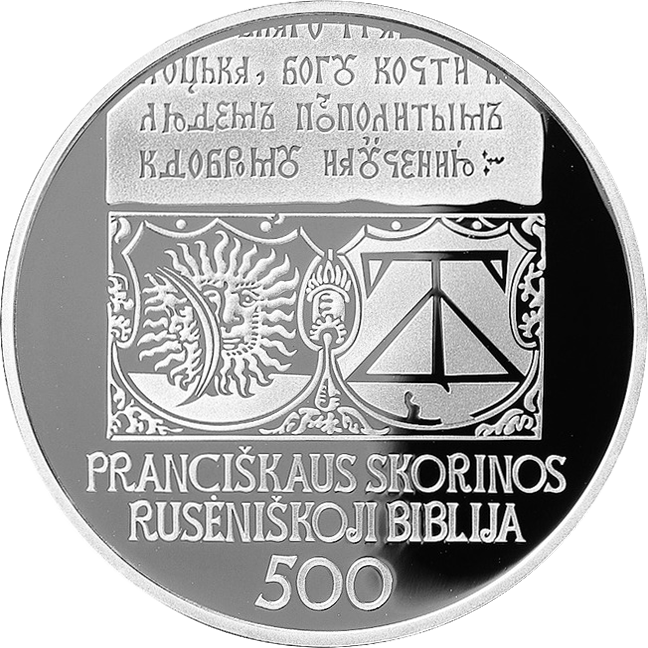
A commemorative Lithuanian 20 euro coin dedicated to Skaryna's Ruthenian Bible (2017)

The language in which Francysk Skaryna printed his books was based on Church Slavonic, but with a large number of Belarusian words, and therefore was most understandable to the inhabitants of the Ruthenian lands of the Grand Duchy of Lithuania (the territory of modern Belarus). Skaryna was one of the pioneers of publishing in Cyrillic script, but not the first: the Oktoikh was published by Schweipolt Fiol in 1491. While he used an East Slavic language, it is difficult to determine precisely what language he used, since there was no standard Belarusian language at that time. Some researchers maintain that Skaryna's books were in Church Slavonic heavily saturated with Ruthenian.

Some Belarusian scholars see Skaryna as a Renaissance man, on par with Copernicus and Erasmus, whose work in the Slavic lands was a part of the European Reformation.

At different times five streets in Minsk, the capital of Belarus, were named after Francysk Skaryna; only one left on the map: the Old Barysau Way (Starabarysauski trakt) was renamed to Skaryna Street (vulica Skaryny) in 2005. After the dissolution of the Soviet Union, the Leninsky Avenue, the main avenue of Minsk was renamed to the Skaryna Avenue. However, in 2005, under the rule of Alexander Lukashenko, it was renamed to the Independence Avenue. Streets are named after Francysk Skaryna in many other cities of Belarus, including Polatsk, Vitebsk, Nesvizh, Orsha, Slutsk.

Two awards are given in Belarus in honor of Skaryna: the Medal of Francysk Skaryna, and the Order of Francysk Skaryna. There are monuments to Francysk Skaryna in Polotsk, Minsk, Lida, Vilnius, Chișinău, and Prague.

Several cultural organizations are named for Skaryna, particularly the Frantsishak Skaryna Belarusian Language Society in Belarus, and the Francis Skaryna Belarusian Library and Museum in London. Homyel State University is named for Skaryna.

In 1969, Boris Stepanov filmed a movie "Я, Францыск Скарына" ("I, Francysk Skaryna") .

In 1991, Skaryna was depicted on the Soviet Union one-ruble coin.

== Sources ==
- "Скорина, Франциск" . Brockhaus and Efron Encyclopedic Dictionary (in Russian). 1906.
