= Wasyl Ciapiński =

Belarusian writer and translator

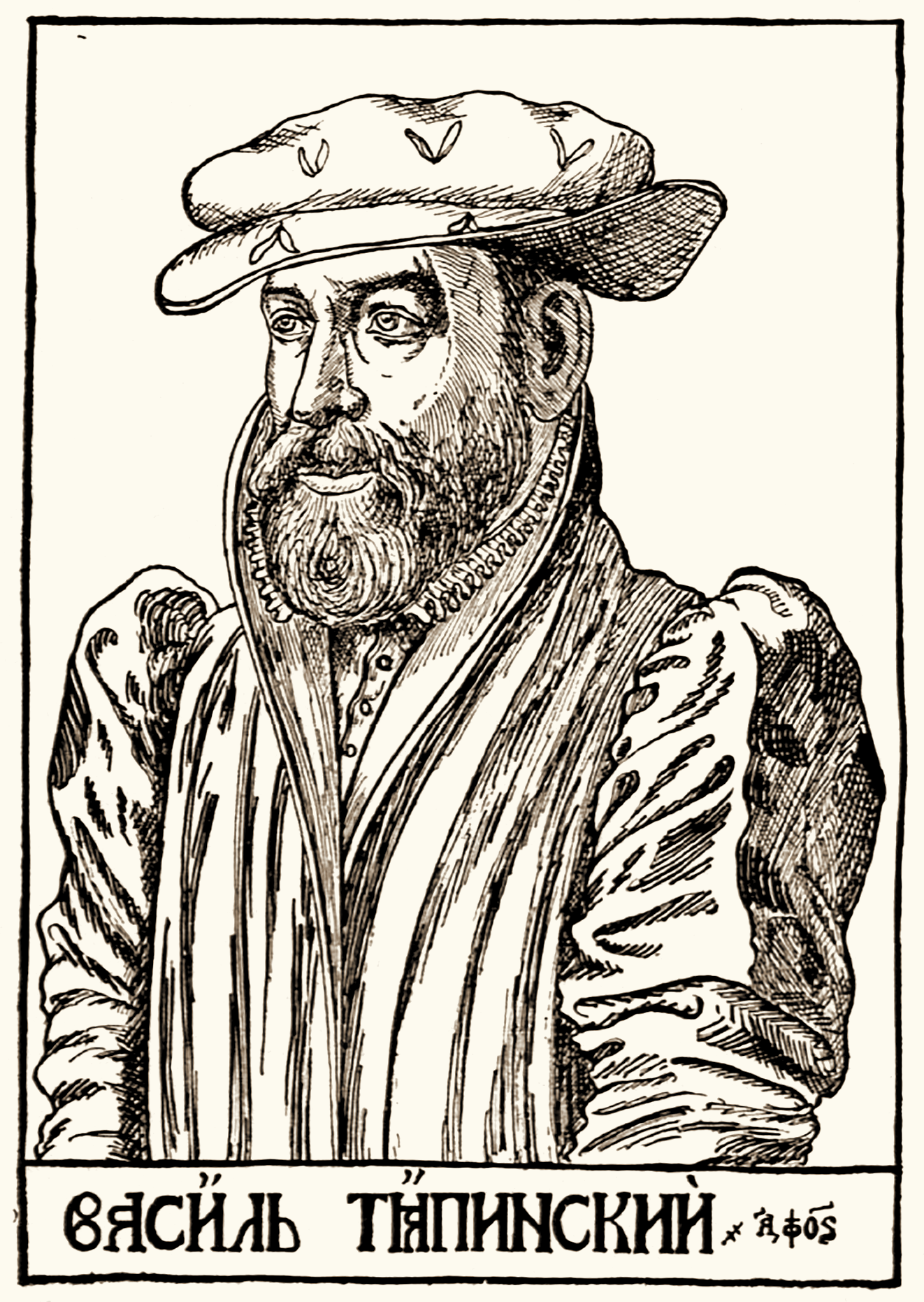
Vasily Tyapinski

Wasyl Ciapiński (Belarusian: Vasil Ciapinski (Васіль Мікалаевіч Цяпінскі-Амельяновіч); Polish: Wasyl Ciapiński, Omelianowicz; Russian: Vasily Tyapinski) (1540s in Vitebsk Voivodeship – c. 1604) was a Belarusian-Lithuanian noble, humanist, educator, writer, publisher and translator from the Grand Duchy of Lithuania known for translating the Bible into the Belarusian language. He was behind the printing of the "Moscow Gospel" in the 1570s, and is regarded as one of the early facilitators of Belarusian printed literature. His Bible is sometimes understood to have been printed in Ukrainian but is today generally regarded as Belarusian language.

== Portrait and authenticity ==
A widely reproduced “portrait” of Wasyl Ciapiński, first published in 1919 by Belarusian bibliophile Ramuald Ziamkievič, has been shown to be based on a 1626 engraved likeness of the French Renaissance architect Philibert de l'Orme. Despite its non-authentic origin, this adapted image circulated throughout the 20th century and became a canonical but historically inaccurate representation of Ciapiński.
