= Jan Barszczewski =

Polish-Belarusian writer and ethnographer

- Jan Barščeŭski
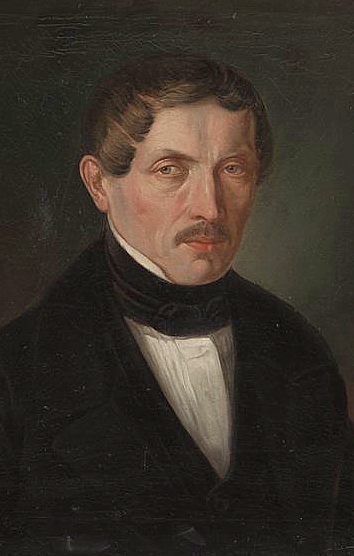
- Born: 1781 generally stated as Murahi village (now in Rasony district of Vitsebsk region of Belarus), although some historians mention Niaviedra village (now - Pustoshkinsky District of Pskovski Oblast in Russia)
- Died: 12 March 1851 (aged 69–70); Chudniv, Volhynian Governorate, Russian Empire
- Writing career
- Language: Belarusian and Polish
- Notable works: Szlachcic Zawalnia, czyli Białoruś w fantastycznych opowiadaniach [Nobleman Zawalnia, or Belarus in Fantastic Stories] (1846)

Jan Barszczewski (Belarusian: Ян Баршчэўскі, Jan Barščeŭski; 1781 – 12 March 1851) was a Polish and Belarusian writer, poet, ethnographer and editor. He wrote both in Belarusian and Polish languages.

He is considered "one of the founders of modern Belarusian literature".

== Early years ==
Barszczewski was born into the family of a Greek Catholic priest who was a minor nobleman. The place of his birth is usually stated as the village of Murahi (now in Rasony district of Vitsebsk region of Belarus), however some historians assert that Barszczewski was in fact born in the village of Niaviedra (now - Pustoshkinsky District of Pskovski Oblast in Russia).

He studied at the Polacak Jesuit College, where he became famous as a reader and writer of poetry. The first known poems written in Belarusian were "The Maiden", "Revolt of serfs", "Robberies of peasants" and "Conversation of serfs". He was also engaged in painting (landscapes and caricatures).

After graduation, Barszczewski worked locally as a home teacher and governor before moving to St. Petersburg.

== Life in St. Petersburg ==
In St. Petersburg he taught Greek and Latin in several government agencies and studied ancient literature. He met A. Mickiewicz and T. Shevchenko, who praised the poetic efforts of the young writer and encouraged him on the path of professional creativity.

He organised a Belarusian literary circle and was the editor of the annual almanac "Niezabudka" ("Forget-me-not").

== Later life and memory ==
In 1847 Barszczewski moved to the town of Chudniv in Ukraine where he continued his literary work. However, he soon contracted tuberculosis and succumbed to the disease on 12 March 1851.

He is buried in Chudniv. In 1997 a monument was erected in his native Murahi - a large boulder with the image of the writer and engraved words "My lonely thoughts return to this land."

== Main works ==
- In 1843 Barszczewski's Belarusian poems "The Maiden", "Vodka" and reworked folk song "Cuckoo" were published for the first time in the magazine "Literary Yearbook".
- His best-known work is Szlachcic Zawalnia, czyli Białoruś w fantastycznych opowiadaniach [Nobleman Zawalnia, or Belarus in Fantastic Stories] (1846). The story is a "classical collection of gothic and folk horror stories based on eerie tales and legends of northern Belarus" which are told by Zawalnia to his guests or travellers. “I love stories like that. There is a lot of God's truth in this folk fantasy” Zawalnia says. The reader is presented with a colourful gallery of folk figures - simple, sensitive people. Their philosophy of life is simple and clear: "He who works and asks God, he himself lives well, and helps people." But the heroes of their stories are lustful people who sell themselves for wealth to various evil spirits and monsters and lose their human existence. People's morality (understanding of "humanity") condemns them.
- In 1849 he published the first part of the collection "Prose and Poems", which included ballads, the poem "The Life of an Orphan", the story "The soul is not in his body."
- First full English translation of "Szlachcic Zawalnia, czyli Białoruś w fantastycznych opowiadaniach" was published in 2025 by Grunwald Publishing (Canada) as "Nobleman Zavalnia, or Belarus in Fantastical Tales". The translated edition includes two companion tales, "The Wooden Old Man and the Insect Woman" and "A Soul Not in Its Own Body".
