= Fiol's Octoechos =

First printed book in Cyrillic script

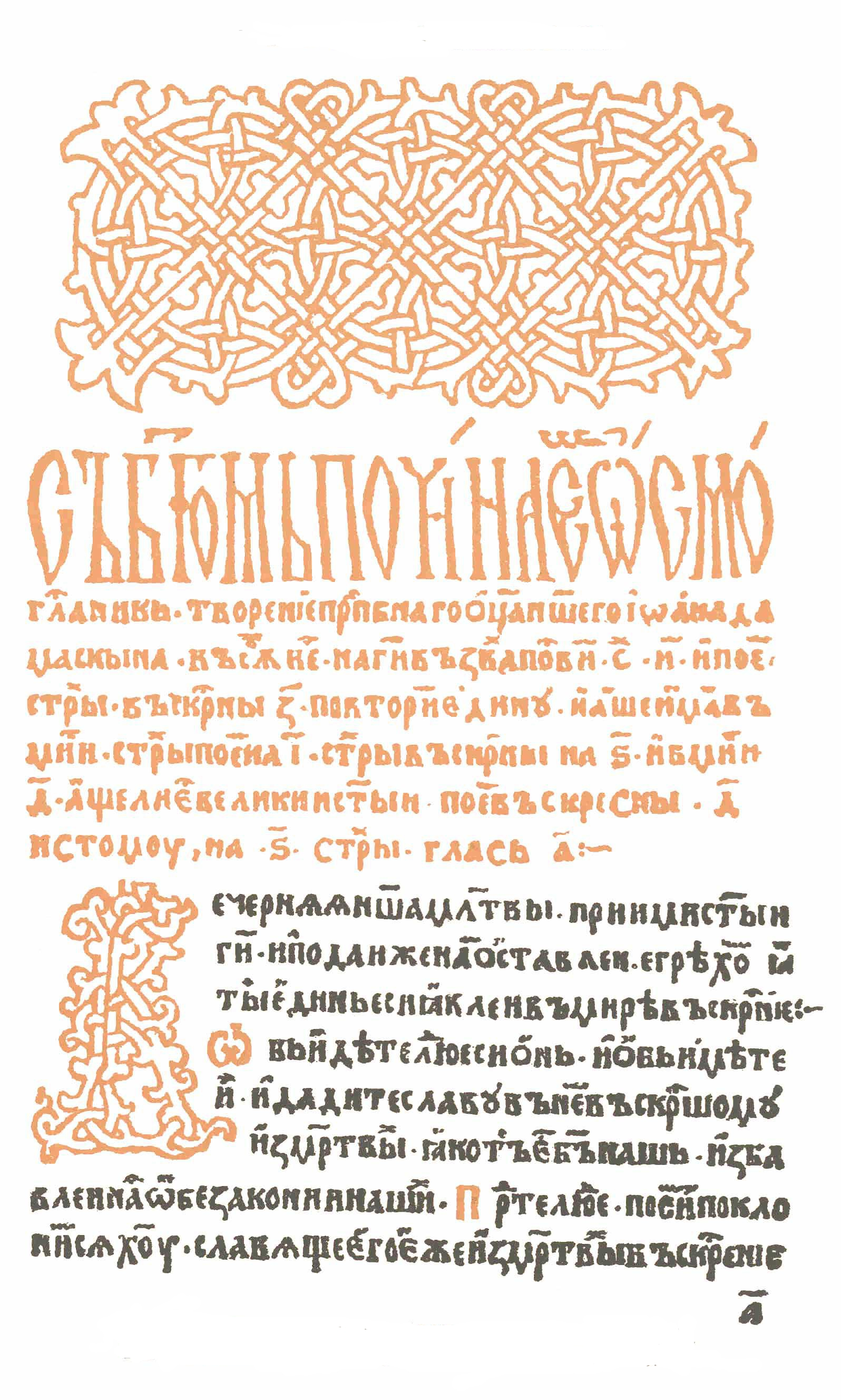
- Language: Church Slavonic
- Published: 1491
- Publisher: Schweipolt Fiol
- Media type: incunabulum

Fiol's Octoechos is an incunabulum octoechos, the first printed book in the Cyrillic script. It was printed by Schweipolt Fiol, a German native of Franconia, in 1491 in Kraków.

The only complete copy, of seven remaining, of Oktoikh is kept by the Russian State Library in Moscow. In the past this copy belonged to Johann Hess (1490–1547), a Wrocław (Breslau) bibliophile and reformer.
