= List of Glagolitic books =

List of Glagolitic books may refer to:

- List of Glagolitic manuscripts
- List of Glagolitic printed works
