= Blaž Baromić =

Croatian printer, calligrapher, founder of the Senj printing press in 1494

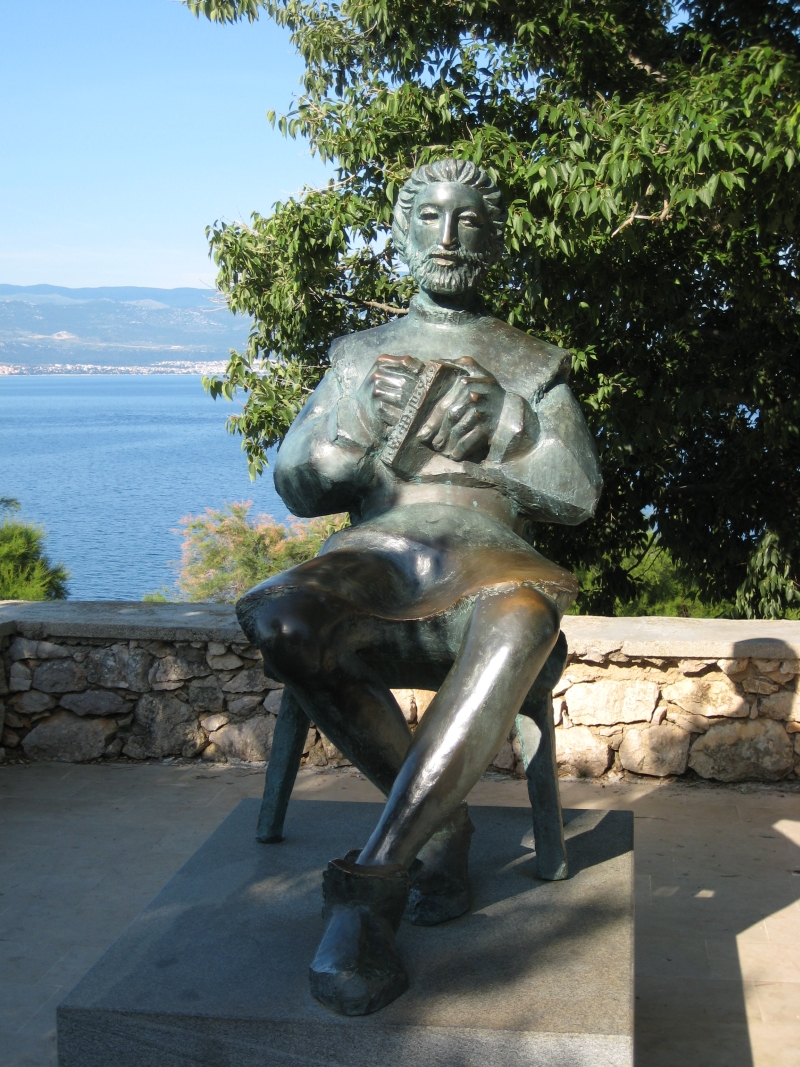
- Statue of Blaž Baromić in Vrbnik, Croatia
- Born: before 1450; Vrbnik
- Died: after 1505; Senj
- Occupations: printer and calligrapher
- Known for: founder of the Senj printing press in 1494

Blaž Baromić (before 1450 in Vrbnik – after 1505 in Senj) was a Croatian printer, scribe, founder of the Senj printing press in 1494, the second oldest Croatian printing press. He is also known for his special typographic set known as Baromić technique of refracted ligatures, unique among incunabulas.

== Biography ==
The exact date and place of birth is unknown, but he is assumed to have been born in Vrbnik on the island of Krk. His first notable work is the Mavro breviary from 1460, which he wrote and illuminated. Between 1484 and 1505, he served as a canon of Senj.

=== Printing press ===
Shortly after, he became acquainted with the printing technology, for which he sought financial support in Senj. He then traveled to Venice where he learned the printing process and acquired all the printing tools needed. In 1493, he also printed his first breviary, under the guidance of Andrea Torresani.

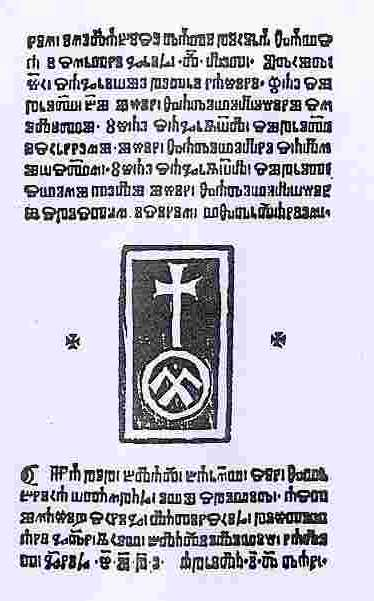
Spovid općena, work printed and translated into Croatian in 1496, shows the insignia of the Senj printing press

In the following year, he founded the Senj printing press together with Silvester Bedričić and Gašpar Turčić. On August 7, 1494, the first work of the printing house was completed, a glagolithic missal, the second edition of the Missale Romanum. A further six titles were published before the press ceased operation in 1508. The most prominent of these was Spovid općena (1496), the first book printed in vernacular Chakavian dialect, and the only Croatian non-liturgical incunabula.

He is known for creating a unique method of composite ligatures in printing; a technique of creating ligatures from fragments of letters which requires particular aesthetic sensitivity. This was taken from existing Glagolithic hand-written codices.

== See also ==
- List of Glagolitic books
- List of Glagolitic manuscripts
