= Spovid općena =

First Croatian printed book from 1496

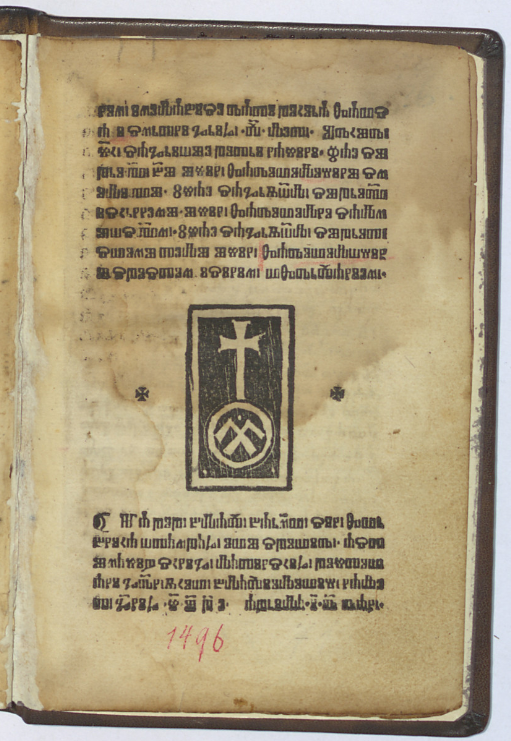
Spovid općena

Spovid općena is a Croatian language printed book produced in 1496 at the Senj printing press (in the Senj area of the Kingdom of Croatia within the Croatian–Hungarian union). The printing is associated with Blaž Baromić and the Senj Glagolitic press, and it is commonly described in Croatian bibliographic literature as the first printed book in the Croatian language (vernacular), as distinct from earlier Croatian Glagolitic incunabula printed in Church Slavonic. It appeared about thirteen years after the Missale Romanum Glagolitice (1483), which is generally regarded as the first Croatian printed book and was printed in the Croatian recension of Old Church Slavonic.

The work is a Glagolitic translation of the Italian penitential manual Confessione (Confessionale) generale by the Milanese preacher Michele Carcano. The translator is identified in bibliographic records as Jakov (Ekov) Blažiolović.

== Description ==
Spovid općena consists of 36 leaves and is described in Croatian library literature as an early non-liturgical Glagolitic incunabulum produced in Croatia. The opening line begins: Počine spovidь opĉena ča est načinь ki ima držati č[lovi]kь naispita ñe konšencie kad se oĉe ispovid[a]ti.

== See also ==
- List of Glagolitic printed works
- Church Slavonic language
