= List of Glagolitic printed works =

This is an incomplete list of documents printed in the Glagolitic script. For handwritten works see List of Glagolitic manuscripts.

Light red represents manuscripts with Glagolitic only as inclusions or paratext.
Pale red represents mixed manuscripts with Glagolitic as a main script.

== List ==
| Date | File | Title | Author | Place | Scan | Comments | Glagolitic pages |
|---|---|---|---|---|---|---|---|
| 1483 (February 22), 1971, 2022 | | ⱞⰻⱄⰰⰾⱜ ⱂⱁ ⰸⰰⰽⱁⱀⱆ ⱃⰻⱞⱄⰽⱁⰳⰰ ⰴⰲⱁⱃⰰ (Missale Romanum Glagolitice, Misal po zakonu rimskoga dvora) | redactor from Istria according to Pantelić | Istria? Venice? | Inc.II.733 (DVL), BX2015.A5 R6 1483 (LoC), 1 D-14 (ÖNB), RI-4°-62 b (NSK, GHR) | First book printed in a Slavic language. Letters similar to 1491 but different. 20 x 30 cm. At least 5 known copies have been lost or destroyed. 11 copies and 8 fragments survive (including 3 one-leaf parchment fragments). In Saint Petersburg the RNB houses 1 full copy (Берч. 1) and 1 fragment 4x7 cm of page 205, both in the Berčić collection. In Bol on Brač the Knjižnica dominikanskog samostana houses 1 fragment of 46 folia. The monastery on Košljun houses 1 fragment of 63 folia (sign. s 1). In Krk, the Arhiv Franjevaca trećoredaca houses 1 parchment copy also of 63 folia (also sign. s 1), 1 larger copy from the Parčić collection (sign. (sign. p 1 - p 2) and 1 even larger copy (sign. c 6). The Vatican Library houses 2 copies (Inc. II-733, Inc. II-734 which belonged to Mihail Kirillovich Bobrovskiy in 1820). The Library of Congress in Washington, D.C. has 1 copy in the Otto Vollbehr collection, BX2015.A5 R6 1483, or LoC Control Number 2010414164). The ÖNB in Vienna houses 1 copy (1D-14). In Zagreb, Knjižnica HAZU houses 2 copies (Ink. II-14a from the Kukuljević collection, Ink. II-14b), the Knjižnica Staroslavenskog zavoda "Svetozar Ritig" houses a 1 folio fragment (sign. OR 2), the NSK houses 2 copies (R I-4°-62a, R I-4°-62b from the Gaj collection). Facsimile published 1971 in Zagreb. Bibliography: | 438 |
| 1491 | | Prvotisak brevijara, "Kosinjski brevijar" | printed by Pellegrino Pasquali | Venice? Kosinj? | | Letters similar to 1483 but different. Redactor believed by Tandarić to be from Istria. Survives only in 1 defective copy without colophon (Venice, Library of Saint Mark, Inc. 1235 (old signatures Inc. Ven. 104 and inv. br. 76865), acquired from the library of the linguist Toseo Ambrogio degli Albonesi); and in 1 parchment fragment of the first 6 numbered folia (Vatican Library, Mus. Borg. P. F. Illirico 19: record) attached to a copy of the 1561 breviary. Black and white photocopy of Venice copy made by 1977, housed at Staroslavenski institut (M 178a); superseded by colour facsimile made 1991, housed at same institution (S II f - 72 /1). Bibliography: | under 792 |
| 1492 (July 16) | | Исповедь (Spovid općena) | Matej Bošnjak, printers Pellegrino Pasquali, Matej Zadranin | Venice | | No copies survive, but a transcription including colophon was found in the Tkonski zbornik (HAZU IV a 120). Bibliography: | ? |
| 1493 (March 13) | | Baromić breviary (Baromićev brevijar) | Blaž Baromić, printer Andrea Torresani | Venice | RI-16°-1a (GHR), Milano B. 277 Inc. 78 N° 390 (IzSt scan created 9 December 2009 from CD given same year to Staroslavenski institut by University of Milan) | Letters similar to 1491 but different; same letters later used for 1561 breviary. 14x10 cm. 5 copies survive, the only complete one in Brukenthal National Museum in Sibiu (sign. I = 362), the others being 1 housed at Venice, 1 at Munich in the Staatsbibliothek (8° Inc. c. a. 161), 1 at the Biblioteca Nazionale Braidense in Milan (B. 277 Inc. 78 N° 390), 2 at the NSK in Zagreb (RI-16°-1a (Note: Microfilm from 1982 kept at Staroslavenski institut (M 168).) and RI-16°-1b). Kruming does not mention the Venice or Milan copies, but does mention a Schwarzau copy (at the Parmaache Herzogliche Bibliothek). Bernoni 1890 mentioned a further copy on parchment but gave no details as to location. The NSK copy RI-16°-1b was a gift from priest Dušan Vuletić of Trieste. Black and white microform copy of RI-16°-1a made by 1978 for Staroslavenski institut. Black and white microfilm and photograph of Brukenthal copy made for Staroslavenski institut in 1995. Bibliography: | 1070 |
| 1494 (7 August) | | Senj missal (Senjski misal, Baromićev misal) | Gašpar Turčić, printer Blaž Baromić, press of Silvestar Bedričić | Senj | No. 19 (GHR) | 14x20 cm. 4 copies survive: 1 almost complete and only with colophon in Budapest at the NSL (Ink. 988), defective one in RNB Saint Petersburg (Берч. 2, together with several fragments in the same collection), very defective one in Monastery of St. Francis Assisi (Cres) (No. 19), one 3 folio fragment which is only copy of frontispiece found inside the copy см. No. 11 of Kožičićev misal in OGNB (1-8814). Facsimile of the Budapest copy published 1994, with some pages from the Cres copy. Bibliography: | under 428 |
| 1496 (25 April) | | ⱄⱂⱁⰲⰻⰴⱜ ⱁⱂⱋⰵⱀⰰ (Confessionale generale of Michele Carcano, Spovid općena) | translator Jakov Blažiolović, printer Blaž Baromić, press of Silvestar Bedričić | Senj | GHR | The only surviving copy is incomplete though with beginning and colophon, in library of Monastery of St. Francis Assisi (Zagreb), combined with Ivančićev zbornik of 1300s/1400s. Facsimile published in Senj 1978. A microfilm exists in DVD format in the Staroslavenski institut (DVD 5(HDA)). Bibliography: | 64 |
| 1507 (October 27) | | ⱀⰰⱃⱆⱍⱀⰻⰽⱜ ⱂⰾⰵⰱⰰⱀⱆⱎⰵⰲⱜ (Manipulus curatorum of Guido de Monte Rochen, Naručnik plebanušev) | redactors Urban of Otočac and Toma Katridarić, printer Grigorij Senjanin, press of Silvestar Bedričić | Senj | R675a (HAZU) | 20x14 cm. 9 copies survive not counting fragments: the RNB Saint Petersburg copy (Берч. 3), the ÖNB Vienna copy (15.479-B.Rara 114), the 1 Vienna Institut für Slavische Philologie copy (25 B 83 or I5.479-B, photocopy by Johannes Reinhart housed at Staroslavenski institut as F 252), the 2 Knjižnica HAZU copies (R 675, R 675a), the 2 copies in the Samostan franjevaca trećoredaca in Zagreb (1 complete, 1 defective), the 1 at Glavotok. Fragments include: 5 separate 1-folio fragments RNB (Берч. folia 9, 15, 62, 113 of one copy, 9 of another), and others. Bibliography: | 230 |
| 1507-1508 | | ⱞⰵⱎⱅⱃⰻⱑ ⱁⰴⱜ ⰴⱁⰱⱃⰰ ⱆⱞⱃⱅⰻⱑ (Ars moriendi, Meštrija od' dobra umrtija), ⱃⰻⱅⱆⰰⰾⱜ (Senjski ritual) | printer Grigorij Senjanin, press of Silvestar Bedričić | Senj | R II A-16°-7 (GHR) | 14x10 cm. 2 surviving copies: one in GPB (Берч. 7), 1 in NSK (R II A-16°-7), both defective and without colophon. Bibliography: | 130 |
| 1508 (May 5) | | ⰶⰻⰲⱁⱅⱜ ⱄⰲⰵⱅⰰⰳⱁ ⰵⱃⱁⰾⰻⱞⰰ (Transit svetog Jerolima, Vita et transitus Sancti Hieronymi) | redactors Urban of Otočac and Toma Katridarić, printer Grgur Senjanin, press of Silvestar Bedričić | Senj | R732 (HAZU) | 14x10 cm. 13 copies surviving, including fragments and trial folia. The RNB Saint Petersburg houses 2 copies (Берч. 6, Берч. 6^{а}), 1 fragment of 8 folia (Берч. 6а), and 3 trial folia in sequence (Берч. 6а). In Zagreb the Knjižnica HAZU houses 4 copies (R732, R732a, R732b, R732c). The parish office at Vrbnik has 1 copy. The Franciscan monastery on Košljun has 1 copy. The Kníhova Národniho musea in Prague has 1 copy (Šafařík collection, sign. KNM 64 F 20). Bibliography: | 290 |
| 1508 (June 15) | | ⱞⰻⱃⰰⰽⱆⰾ ⱄⰾⰲⱜⱀⰵ ⰴⱑⰲⰵ ⱞⰰⱃⰻⰵ (Mirakuli slavne děve Marie) | redactors Urban of Otočac, Toma Katridarić, printer Grgur Senjanin, press of Silvestar Bedričić | Senj | R738 (HAZU), R738a (HAZU), R738b (HAZU) | 14x10 cm. 6 copies surviving. In Saint Petersburg, the RNB has 1 copy (Берч. 4). In London, the British Museum has 1, the only copy with colophon (General Reference Collection C.48.b.23., microfilm M 143 at Staroslavenski institut made 1979 and photocopy F 250 made by 1995). The Vatican Library has 1 copy (Barb. Lat. 4032, microfilm FILM br. 18/1 made by 1978 at Državni arhiv u Karlovcu and G-53 at HDA), the Knjižnica HAZU has 3 copies (R 738a, R 738b, R 738c). Bibliography: | 150 |
| 1508 (October 17), 1981 | | ⰽⱁⱃⰸⱞⰵⱀⰰⰽⱜ ⱇⱃⰰ ⱃⱆⰱⰵⱃⱅⰰ (Sermones quadragesimales of Roberto Caracciolo, Korizmenjak fratra Ruberta) | translators Petar Jakovčić and Silvestar Bedričić, redactors Urban of Otočac and Toma Katridarić, printer Grgur Senjanin, press of Silvestar Bedričić | Senj | R674 (HAZU), GHR | 20x14 cm. 14 copies survive. In Saint Petersburg, the RNB has 2 copies (Берч. 5, Берч. 5^{а}) and 1 fragment of 2 folia (also in Berčić collection but without signature as of 1998). In Zagreb, 1 copy is in NSK (R II A-8°-7), 4 in Knjižnica HAZU (R 674, R 674a, R 674b, R 674c), 2 copies at the sv. Ksaver monastery. 1 copy in Ljubljana at NUK (R18370). Facsimile published in Senj 1981. Bibliography: | 215 |
| 1527, 1933, 1983, 2007 | | ⰱⱆⰽⰲⰰⱃⱜ (Prva hrvatskoglagoljska početnica) | printer Andrea Torresani | Venice | 1527: RIIA-8°-19 (GHR), 1933 reprint: GHR, / 1983 reprint: /, 2007 reprint: / | 20x14 cm. Original number of copies unknown. Original did not use same letters as Torresani's other Glagolitic books (Baromićev brevijar 1493 and 1561 Brozićev brevijar), but rather letters closer to letters of 1528 Missal of Pavao Modrušanin. 5 copies surviving. In Saint Petersburg the RNB has 1 copy (Гл. 33). In New York the Pierpoint Library has 1 copy. In Oxford the Bodleian has 1 copy (sign. 4 °C 51(3) Th.Seld.). In Cambridge the MA has 1 copy. In Milan the Biblioteca Ambrosiana has 1 copy (S.Q.V.IV.40). In Vienna the ÖNB has 1 copy (sign. CP.2B.83, from which the 1978 facsimile). The NSK in Zagreb acquired 1 copy in 2007. Facsimile 1933 in Leipzig (25 copies), 1983 (1670 copies), 2007. Bibliography: | 12 |
| 1528 | | Missal of Pavao Modrušanin (Misal Pavla Modrušanina) | Slavin Dobrovski, Pavao Modrušanin, printers Francesco Bindoni and Maffeo Pasini | Venice | RIIA-8°-9b (GHR) | Letters similar to 1527 but different. 20.5x15 cm. 20 copies surviving. In Saint Petersburg, the RNB has 2 copies (Берч. 8, Берч. 8a a gift from Václav Hanka mistakenly labelled as a Glagolitic "служебник с 1828 года") and 2 fragments both of folio 153 (in Berčić collection). In Odessa the OGNB has 1 copy (1-8811). In Zagreb, the NSK has 2 copies (R 315a in kutija L, from which the 1997 photocopy F 255 at the Staroslavenski institut, plus one incomplete copy), Arhiv HAZU has 1 copy (Fragm. glag. 103), the Samostana franjevaca trćega reda sv. Ksaver has 1 copy. The city of Krk has 1 copy. Košljun has 1 copy. Vienna has 1 copy (ÖNB sign. 182.243 - B Rara). Oxford has 1 copy (Bodleian sign. Slav. 3.45, with exlibris of Frederick North the 5th Earl of Guilford). There is 1 copy in Cambridge (University Library). London has 1 copy (British Library sign. C. 52. e. 1). Prague has 1 copy in the NB (sign. XXIII E 67 Ae 119), 2 copies in the Kníhova Národniho musea (64 E 34, 64 D 2), 1 copy in the LK. In Schwarzau there is 1 copy at the Parmaache Herzogliche Bibliothek. In Rome there is 1 copy in the BPF (sign. R'I-57). In Venice the Fondazione Cini has 1 copy. Bibliography: | 449 |
| 1530 (December 15) | | Oficii rimski (Oficij rimski, Служба блаженной деве марии) | redactor Šimun Kožičić, printers Dominic and Bartolomeo Zanetti | Rijeka | RIIA-16°-5 (GHR) | 13.5x7.5 cm. 6 copies surviving. In Saint Petersburg the RNB has 2 copies (Гл. 34, Берч. 10). In Weimar the HAAB has 1 copy (12 IX 64b). In Milan the Biblioteca Ambrosiana has 1 copy (S.Q.V.I-3, old sign. P 128). In Zagreb, the NSK has 1 copy (R II A-16°-5, and 2001 facsimile on CD 15 of the Staroslavenski institut) and the Metropolitanska knjižnica has 1 (M 68, formerly MR 1170). Bibliography: | 236 |
| 1531 (April 28) | | Misal hruacki (Kožičić missal, Kožičićev misal) | redactor Šimun Kožičić, printer Bartolomeo Zanetti | Rijeka | RIIA-8°-8 (GHR) | 20x14 cm. 16 copies surviving. The GPB has 2 copies (Берч. 9, Берч. 9), the OGIM/GIM (Библиотека государственного исторического музея) has 1 copy (Чертк. 434). In Odessa the OGNB has 1 copy and 1 fragment of folia 98-103 (both under 1-8814 + 9). In Saint Petersburg the RNB has 2 (Гл. 35, (Note: A donation from the emperor in January 1811.) Берч. 9). The Biblioteka Uniwersytecka of Wrocław has 1 (sign. 391112/4K 741/). In Zagreb, the Metropolitanska knjižnica has 1 (sign. M 28586), (Note: Once part of Valvasor's library per Magić 2005.) the Knjižnica HAZU has 1 (R 600), the NSK has 1 (sign. R II A-8°-8) and 1 fragment of 5 pages (sign. R II A-8°-19). The Znanstvena knjižnica of Dubrovnik has 1 (sign. 1904-A). The NUK of Ljubljana has 1 (I0047). (Note: From the collection of Sigmund Zois, Freiherr of Edelstein.) The Župni ured of Punat on Krk has 1. The British Library of London has 1 (C.110.e.2(1)), the Bodleian Library of Oxford has 1 (4° Th. BS L 12). The Knjižnica kapucinskog samostana in Rijeka has 1. The Vatican Library has 1 (Riserva V 89). (Note: With 1820 note by M. K. Bobrovskiy.) The Biblioteca Nazionale Centrale of Rome has 1 (sign. 69.6, K. 25). Bibliography: | 512 |
| 1531 (May 2), 1983/1984 | | Mali ritual "Knižice krsta" | press of Šimun Kožičić, printers Dominic and Bartolomeo Zanetti | Rijeka | CC. 18.1.4(16) (IzSt 2009 [part.]), 8° 49052 (IzSt 2009 [part.]) | 14x10 cm. 3 copies surviving. In Saint Petersburg the RNB has 1 copy (VIII.2.64-65, См. No. 15, newer? n. 3093), (Note: With former note of ownership by Adriaan van Roomen.) In Paris the Bibliothèque Mazarine has 1 copy (n. 49.052, or 8° 49052). In Vicenzathe Biblioteca Civica Bertoliana has 1 copy (CC. 18.1.4(16)). Facsimile in 2 parts printed in Ljubljana and Zagreb 1983/1984 from No 3039 (and a full colour facsimile, CD 15 of the Staroslavenski instutut, was made in 2001). Bibliography: | 48? |
| 1531 (May 25), 2007 | Od žitiê rimskih' arhierêov' i cesarov' | Od žitiê rimskih' arhierêov' i cesarov' | Šimun Kožičić | Rijeka | | 20x14 cm. With a handwritten addition by an unknown hand on the last page in maybe 1603 or 1609. 7 copies surviving. The OGNB has 1 copy (1-9050). The ÖNB of Vienna has 1 (CP. 2. B. 85). The British Library of London has 1 (C. 110. e. 2(2)). The Vatican Library has 1 (Riserva IV 64, 1988 photocopy by brother Tomislav Mrkonjić at Staroslavenski institut under F 233). The Kaptolski arhiv of Zadar has 1 (sign. 2589). The Knjižnica HAZU of Zagreb has 1 (R 698). The Biblioteka Uniwersytecka of Wrocław has 1 (sign. 445547). Facsimile of 445547 printed 2007. Bibliography: | 120 plus Glagolitic notes in some copies |
| 1531 (27 May), 2009 | | Od bitija redovničkoga knjižice | Šimun Kožičić | Rijeka | | 14x10 cm. Only 1 copy survives, in the RNB in Saint Petersburg (VIII.2.64-65, См. No. 12). It was once part of the library of Adriaan van Roomen. Facsimile published 2009. Bibliography: | 24? |
| 1531 (after May 27), 1976 | | Psaltir (Bukvar) | Šimun Kožičić | Rijeka | 1530: /, 1976 reprint: / | Kožičićev Bukvar, designated Azbukividarium glagoliticum by Šafařík 1865. 1 surviving copy: Petersburg, Saltykov-Shchedrin State Public Library, Rare books collection, fasc. VIII 2.64. Acquired by that library in 1905. A 2021 facsimile is on CD 15 of the Staroslavenski institut. There was also a copy in the Knjižnica Metropolitana in Zagreb detailed by Šafařík, but it is still lost as of Zubčić 2018. Facsimile printed 1976. Bibliography: | 16? |
| 1538, 1960s | | Linguarum duodecim characteribus differentium alphabetum | Guillaume Postel | Paris | IA, BnF | Latinic with Glagolitic abecedary. First facsimile in the 1960s. Microform by BnF in 1971, ÖNB in 1996. | 1 |
| 1545, 1547, 1548, 1550, 1553, 1556, 1561, 1566, 1578, 1588, 1953, 1965, 1972, 2007 | | Libro di M. Giovambattista Palatino cittadino romano (later Compendio del gran volvme de l'arte del bene et leggiadramente scrivere tvtte le sorti di lettere et caratteri) | Giovambattista Palatino | Rome | 1548 (IA), 1550 (IA), 1561 (IA), 1953 facsimile of 1561 (IA), 1578 (IA), | Latinic with a Glagolitic abecedary, first included in the 1st edition enlarged published in 1545. Further editions also included it: 1548, 1547, 1550, 1553, 1556, 1561, 1566, 1578, 1588, (Note: But absent from the Google Books scan of the 1588 edition.) possibly more. Facsimile 1953 in New York, 1965 in Rome. First English translation published 1972 in Wormley, second 2007 in Newport. Microform 1993 in Valencia. | 1 |
| 1549, 1564 | | Libellus valde doctus, elegans, et utilis | Urban Wyss | Zürich (1549), Strasbourg (1564) | IA | Latinic with unusual Pseudo-Glagolitic abecedary labelled "ALPHABE. ILIRICUM SCLAVOR." Second edition 1564. Pseudo-Glagolitic abecedary reproduced in several derivative works. | 0 |
| 1560 | | Mali probni list | Stipan Istrian, printer Hans Hartwich | Nuremberg | | Only 1 copy survives, in the Haus-, Hof- und Staatsarchiv of Vienna (Österr. Akten, Abt. Crain, Fasc. 3, Fol. 171-178). Facsimile in Rupel 1957. Bibliography: | |
| 1560, 1564 | | Veliki probni list (Probezettel, Proba glagolskoga pis'ma) | Stipan Istrian, printer Hans Hartwich | Nuremberg | | These larger Glagolitic trial folia were printed in 200 copies, which may or may not include their reprint in 1564. The text was Romans 1 and Psalm 117. Only 1 copy of the original 1560 printing survives, in the Hauptstaatsarchiv of Stuttgart (A 119, Büschel 6). Facsimile in Rupel 1957. Bibliography: | |
| 1561, 1564, 1959, 1986, 2007 | Tabla Za Dicu. Edne malahne knižice ... | Tabla Za Dicu (Abecedarium, und der gantze Catechismuss ohne Auslegung in der Chrobatischen Sprache) | Stipan Istrian, Primož Trubar, printer Magdalena Morhart | Tübingen | NBKM Rхьр 561.1 (GHR) | 2000 copies printed. According to Kukuljević two Table were printed in 1561, one in Prague with catechism and one in Tübingen without. 22-24 copies surviving: 1 in the NBS (No. 4816/12), 1 in BL (C. 110. a. 15. (3)), 1 in the Bodleian at Oxford (q. 14. 10 (3)), 1 that was in SBB (Ep. 6414) but now RGB (inv. No. 6593 or 7516), (Note: Once at the Berlin State Library, at the time it was still the Royal Library at Berlin. Also once owned by a certain W. Jackson.) 1 in HAAB (Cat. XVIII.517), 1 at the Basel University Library (F. O. XI. 1 d), 2 in ÖBV (38.D.49 and/or 38. D. 50, 20.Z.51), 1 in HAB (1206.3 Theol. 8°), 1 in ULB (W. 4217. 8°), 1 that was in SLUB (Lit. slav. 113 or Ling. slav. 62) but now RSL (No. 6601), 1 in the ThULB (Cat. XVI. 517), 1 in NSK (R. 322), 1 in the Kassel Landesbibliothek (Catech. 8°.28), (Note: Probably given by baron Ungnad to Philip I of Hesse.) 1 in the destroyed Königsberg State and University Library (Se. 1057), 1 in KU (?), 1 in NUK (II.C.b.21140), 1 in BSB (?), SbN (?), 1 in BNU (?), 1 in SbF (?), 1 in UB Tübingen (G.I.171.8° or Ck XII 61-OR), 2 in UB Stuttgart (?, ?), 1 in collection of doctor Schürrer in Zurich, 1 seen by Dobrovsky in the treasury of St Wenceslaus in Mladá Boleslav, 1 now lost copy that was in Rumyantsev Museum (Shchukin collection No. 848, now part of RSL). Copies of the 1564 edition: 1 in Moscow (RGB, inv. No 6610, bound with the Crikvêni ordinalic), 1 in Ljubljana (NUK, br. 19900). Facsimile published in 1959 with 300 copies. Bibliography: | 23 |
| 1561 | | Katehismus (Catechismus) | Primož Trubar, Stipan Istrian | Tübingen | ESlg/Catech. 148 (MDZ 23 August 2013), Gi 171 (ODT 2016), RIIA-16°-3b (GHR), R 21140 (DKS 21 May 2021) | 2000 copies printed. 22-24 copies of the 1st edition surviving: 1 in the NBS (No. 4816/12), 1 in BL (110. a. 15. (4)), 1 in the CL at Oxford (q. 14. 10 (4)), 1 that was in SBB (Ep. 6414) but now RNB (No. 6593), another 1 in the RNB (No. 6601), 1 that was in SLUB (Lit. slav. 113) but now in the RNB (No. 6601), 1 in HAAB (Cat. XVIII.517), 2 in ÖBV (38.D.49, 20.Z.51), 1 in HAB (1206. 3 Theol. 8°), 1 in the Universitäts- und Landesbibliothek Darmstadt (W. 4217. 8°), 1 in NSK (R. 322 or R II A-16°-3), (Note: R II A-16°-3 was a gift to the predecessor of the NSK by ban Ivan Mažuranić.) 1 in the Kassel Landesbibliothek (Catech. 8°.28), 1 in the Thuringian University and State Library at Weimar (Cat. XVIII. 517), 1 in the Staatsbibliothek of Memmingen (Nr. 9, 7, 3, ), 1 in the Bavarian State Library in Munich, 1 in the Staatsbibliothek in Nuremberg, 1 in the destroyed Königsberg State and University Library (Se. 1057), 1 in KU (?), 1 in NUK (II.C.b.21140), 1 in BSB (?), 1 in the Newberry Library in Chicago, 1 in BNU in Strasbourg (?), 1 in the German National Library at Frankfurt-am-Main (Symb. Luther. 413), 1 in UB Tübingen (Gi 171 (R)), 2 in UB Stuttgart (both under Theolog. 8°), 1 in collection of doctor Schürrer in Zurich, 1 seen by Dobrovsky in the treasury of St Wenceslaus in Mladá Boleslav, 1 now lost copy that was in Rumyantsev Museum (Shchukin collection No. 848, now part of RSL). Some sources also list a Hervatski katekismus cum Salamonis Proverbiis of Primož Trubar published 1580. (Note: gl. Marci a S. Paduano. Bibliotheca Carnioliae) Bibliography: Bibliography: | 112 |
| 1561 (March) | | Brozić breviary (Brozićev brevijar) | redactor Nikola Brozić, printers Andrea, Girolamo and Bernardo Torresani | Venice | RIIA-16°-9 (GHR) | 14x10 cm. Same letters used as for 1493. It was the last book printed in the Croatian redaction of Church Slavonic. About 20 surviving copies known. In Saint Petersburg the RNB has 6 copies (Берч. 11^{а}, 11^{д}, 11^{б}, 11^{б} (1), 11^{б} (2)) and a total of 89 fragmentary folia in the Berčić collection. (Note: RNB fragmentary folia are pages 78, 163, 165-166, 178-183, 194-195, 197-198, 197-200, 202-207, 200=240, 249, 251, 286, 300, 309-316, 382-404, 406-421, 423-427, 432-434, 457-461.) In Odessa there is 1 copy at the OIKM. At Ostrog there is 1 copy at the IKZ. On Košljun there is 1 copy. In Zagreb, the Knjižnica HAZU has 1 copy (R 783; microfilm copy FILM br. 7 and photocopy F 225 both made 1986 and kept at Staroslavenski institut, microfilm G-43 (ZM 57/4) kept at HDA). In London the British Library has 1 copy (C. 35, d. 20). In Oxford the Bodleian has 1 copy (8° A 27 Th.BS.). The Uppsala University Library has 1 copy with shelfmark Ksl. 131. In Milan the Biblioteca Ambrosiana has 1 copy (sign. S.P.XII.183, ex S.Q.V.II.40). In Rome the Biblioteca Angelica has 1 copy and the Vatican Library has 5 copies (Mus. Borg. P. F. Illirico 19 bound with the 1491 breviary, Mus. Borg. P. F. Illirico 20, Mus. Borg. P. F. Illirico 21, Stamp. Barb. C.I.34, Adine III 238). In Vienna the ÖNB has 1 copy (15491-A). Bibliography: name="Koeppen 1826" /> | 1089 |
| 1562 | | Brozićev misal | redactor Nikola Brozić | Venice | | Quarto format, like the breviary. | |
| 1562 | Artikuli ili deli prave stare krstianske vere | Artikuli ili deli prave stare krstianske vere (Confessio, oder Bekanntnuß des Glaubens) | Anton Dalmatin and Stipan Istrian | Bad Urach | GHR, R 18371 (DSK), R 100050 (DSK 9 June 2021), Gc 156 (ODT 2015) | Translation of 1530 Confessio Augustana with prefaces. Printed in 1000 copies. Known copies of Part 1 as of 1936 according to Bučar and Fancev: Zagreb (NSK, R325; NSK, R II A-8º-11), Ljubljana (NUK sign. V. 3. a. 18.371 or 18371), Kaliningrad (University library Cc 164), Saint Petersburg (BAN sign. No 998сп.; (Note: Once belonged to the Bibliotheca Ducali Radivilliana Nesvisiensi.) RNB sign. Гл. 31), (Note: Гл. 31 once belonged to lord Aleksiy Borisovichŭ Lobanov Rostovskiy.) Kassel (University library, sign. Catech. 4º 14), Vienna (National Library, 21. V. 51), Augsburg (Staats- und Stadtbibliothek, 2 copies under sign. Th. H. 4º together with one of Edni kratki razumni nauci) Basel (University library, sign. F. N. X. 9), Rothenburg ob der Tauber (Konsist. bibl., Nr. 329), Stuttgart (Royal land library, sign. Theol. 4º), Ulm (State library, sign. Nr. 2052), Berlin (Royal library, sign. L. r. 8º 326), Dresden (SLUB, sign. Theol. evang. gener. 313), Frankfurt am Main (City library, Symb. Luth. 162^{d}), Erlangen (University Library, sign. Thl. VI 62 4º), Halle (University Library, Jf 1856), Magdeburg (City library, sign. II. 62. 4º-2), Munich (LMU Munich's University Library, Staatsbibliothek; BSB sign. H. Ref. 21. a), National library 1 copy), Nuremberg (Staatsbibliothek, Str. Mel. 8º 1486), Tübingen (University Library, Gc 156 (R)), London (British Museum 1 copy; Oxford University Library, sign. 4º. G. 14. Iw. Scld. or sign. 4º. G. Iw. Seld.), New York (Public Library, copy bound with the 1562 Cyrillic edition of the Artikuli), Vatican Library, 1 copy for sale in 1907 by Berlin antiquarian Marti Bresslauer (seller Wolf von Stolberg Wenigerode), 1 copy in Zagreb purchased 1912 from Leipzig antiquarian O. Harassowitz. HAZU now has 1 copy (ZP-138). rom one of the copies a microfilm was made in 1978 for the Staroslavenski institut (FILM br. 23/3). Bibliography: | 244 |
| 1562 (after September 13) | | Edni kratki razumni nauci (Loci Communes rerum theologicarum) | | Urach | 77.Dd.488 (ÖNB), R 10014 (DSK 21 May 2021) | Printed in 1000 copies, of which about 20 survive. Known copies: Prague (National Library, Lobkovic collection, sign. 32 H 194 Tresor Be 110), Kaliningrad (University library, sign. Cc 167), Moscow (RGB, inv. No 6606), Saint Petersburg (BAN, No 999сп), (Note: From the Bibliotheca Ducali Radivilliana Nesvisiensi.) Basel (University library, sign. F. O. VII. 10), Budapest (National museum, sign. Hung. c. 1239. I or Hung. e. 1239. 1; another copy at the Országos Széchényi Könyvtár), Dresden (SLUB), Vienna (Royal library, sign. 77. D. 488), Augsburg (Staats- und Stadtbibliothek, sign. Th. H. 4º), Berlin (Royal library, sign. L. r. 8º 320), Erlangen (University Library, sign. Thl. VI 62 4º Frankfurt am Main (Staatsbibliothek, sign. Symb. Luth. 181), Munich (BSB, sign. 4^{4} Catech. 32), Kassel (University library, sign. Cath. 4º 13), Regensburg (Okružna bibl.), Rothenburg ob der Tauber (Konsistor. bibl., sign. Nr. 566), Tübingen (University library, Gf 299a 4º (R)), Cambridge (Harvard University Library), London (British Library per Kruming but British Museum per Bučar), Vatican Library, 1 copy was being sold for 500 M at the antiquariat of Ludwig Rosenthal in Munich. There is 1 copy of one of the parts at Vienna (Austrian National Library, sign. 77.Dd.488) Bibliography: | 296 |
| 1562 (after August 25), 1563 | /, | Postila | Anton Dalmatin and Stipan Istrian | Urach | Parts 1 and 2 combined: RIIA-8°-10 (GHR), Res/4 H.ref. 210 a#Beibd.1 (MDZ 29 October 2013), R 10048 (DKS 9 June 2021), Gi 107.4 (ODT 2015]) | Parts 1 and 2 in single book. Printed in 1000 copies. 2nd edition 1563. Not to be confused with the "Domaća postila" (Hausspostill), whose printing in Glagolitic, Cyrillic and Latinic was planned in 1563 but it was never printed if it was translated, in contrast to the Slovene translation which was printed in 1595. Known copies: Zagreb (NSK sign. R321 or R II A-8º-10; Metropolitan library sign. M 344 formerly M. R. 1172), Ljubljana (NUK, sign. V. 3. a. 18373), Prague (National Library, Slovanská knihovna, T 4331 J 17829), Krakow (Jagiellonian Library), Moscow (OGIM, Меньш. 1424; (Note: From the P. I. Shukin collection) RGB inv. No 6602; (Note: The RGB No 6602 is the Royal Library in Berlin where it had sign. Df 1574.) RGB inv. No 7520; (Note: RGB No 7520 is from the V. M. Undolskiy collection.) RGB No 6309), Saint Petersburg (Public library), Lviv (Львівська національна наукова бібліотека імені В. Стефаника, Ст. II - 3323; Ст. II - 3323/2), (Note: Both copies from the A. S. Petrushkevich collection.) London (British Library C. 65. e. 9), Magdeburg (Stadt- und Kreisbibliothek, sign. II. 62. 4º. 1), Moscow (Rumyantsev Museum, Shchubin collection 788), Budapest (Magyar Tudományos Akadémia Könyvtára sign. Ráth. 1772), (Note: From the G. Ráth collection. Includes German note of gifting at Neuberg an der Thonau presumably by baron Ungnad himself dated 24 September 1564.) 4 in Vienna (2 copies at National Library, sign. 2. E. 44 and B. 2. E. I. N. 75; 2 copies at University library), Annaberg (Kreisbibliothek), 2 in Basel (University library, sign. FG. VII. 50 and FG. VI. 50 bis), Dresden (SLUB, sign. Lit. slav. 7), Frankfurt am Main (City library, sign. Nov. Test. Evan. 303), Göttingen (University library, sign. Theol. Past. 334a), Kassel (University library, sign. Th. Past. Hom., 4º, 134), Königsberg (University library, sign. Cc 175), Leipzig (University library, sign. pred. in Erb. L. 440), Munich (LMU Munich's University library sign. 4º Hom. 149; BSB sign. H. Ref. 21 a which is combined with the Artikuli), Nuremberg (Staatsbibliothek sign. Th. 62. 4º), Rothenburg ob der Tauber (Konsistorij. bibl. sign. Nr. 728), Stuttgart (Württembergische Landesbibliothek, Theol. 4º 465), Tübingen (University library, sign. Gi 107.4º (R)), Wolfenbüttel (HAB sign. 148. 12. Theol. 4º), Vatican Library (mentioned by Assemani 1755 and by Dobrovsky), Rome (Bibliot. Casanatense sign. A. IX. 69), Paris (Bibliothèque Mazarine, sign. 11873), 1 for sale by Berlin antiquarian Martin Bresslauer. One copy of both parts at Uppsala University Library with shelfmark "173 B e Övers. serb. 1562-63 Nya Testamentet". Bibliography: | 627 |
| 1562 | | Predike od tuče | | Urach | | No surviving copies. Existence of Glagolitic edition unknown. Date uncertain. | |
| 1562-1563 | Novi teštament | Novi teštament | Anton Dalmatin and Stipan Istrian, printer Magdalena Morhart | Urach | Part 1: ESlg/4 B.rel. 15 c-1 (MDZ 11 September 2013), R 18372 (DSK 21 May 2021), Part 2: ESlg/4 B.rel. 15 c-2 (MDZ 6 September 2013) | Part 1 in 1562 in 2000 copies. Some paper, others parchment. It was the last Glagolitic book printed on parchment. Known copies of Part 1 as of 1936 according to Bučar and Fancev: Zagreb (NSK, sign. R328; (Note: From the library of professor Brunschmid.) R II A-8º-12; (Note: A gift from Josip Broz Tito.) Arhiv HAZU sign. Fragm. glag. 109 of just f. 76), Ljubljana (NUK, sign. 18372, v. 3), Prague (National Library, sign. 26 G 81, Tresor Be 162), Wrocław (Miejska Biblioteka, sign. 4. K. 160 together with Part 2; University Library copy just Part 1), Elbląg (City library, sign. R. 4), Kaliningrad (Konsistorij. bibl., sign. Cb 131, 4º I. 2), Moscow (Научная библиотека МГУ, 2 Ag I6; (Note: Possibly acquired through A. I. Turgenev's library.) RGB inv. No 9376-9377 together with Part 2, second copy of Part 1 inv. No 9472), (Note: No 9472 belonged to Christian Ernst beron of Stolberg in 1721.) Saint Petersburg (Library of the Russian Academy of Sciences No 1001-1002 together with Part 2; (Note: From the Bibliotheca Ducali Radivilliana Nesvisiensi.) RNB Берч. 12 including 2 exemplars both with Part 2 as well and 1 exemplar with just Part 1 with sign. a 1 - b 2), (Note: The exemplar with sign. a 1 - b 2 was once part of the library of the Общество любителей древней письменности.) British Museum, Budapest (National museum library, sign. Bibl. 340; Magyar Tudományos Akadémia Könyvtára sign. Ráth. 1771/a; (Note: The MTAK copy was once part of the Bibliotheca Ulrici Fuggeri.) Országos Széchényi Könyvtár sign. Ant. 2908), Graz (University library, sign. I. 742, together with Part 2), Vienna (Royal library, together with Part 2 as sign. 2. G. I; University library, sign. I-7-142), Basel (University library sign. FG X^{2} 39-40, together with Part 2; also Frey.-Gryn. A. IV. 25, together with Part 2), (Note: To A. IV. 25 is bound a manuscript by Stipan Istrian himself of the 1564 abecedary.) Berlin (Royal library, sign. L. r. 8º 322, from Sterhemberg collection), Zürich (Zentralbibliothek), Darmstadt (University and State Library, sign. V. 789-4º, together with Part 2), Magdeburg (City library, II. 62. 4º), Erlangen (University Library, sign. Thl. II 53a 4º), Dresden (SLUB, sign. Biblia 1126), Frankfurt am Main (City library, sign. Nov. Test. Croat. 152), Gotha (Vojvodska bibl. Th. 4. p. 39, together with Part 2), Göttingen (University library, Bibl. II. 5215), Halle (University library, Jc. 7451), Kassel (University Library, sign. Bibl. Bohem. et Crobat. 4º I), Munich (LMU Munich's University library 4º bibl. 999 together with Part 2; Royal library 4B Rel. Croat. 15 Ka together with Part 2; State library together with Part 2), Nuremberg (City library Th. 63, 4º), Rothenburg ob der Tauber (Konsistor. bibl., sign. N. 448), Strasbourg (University library, sign. 20223), Stuttgart (Royal library, sign. Bibl. Slavon. 4º), Tübingen (University library sign. G. a. XXVIII. I. 4º Band 1-2 (R) together with Part 2; Stifts bibl.), Weimar (Thuringian University and State Library, sign. Cat. XVI. 5176 b), Wernigerode (Kneževska bibl., sign. Na 2253), Wittenberg (Vojvodska bibl.), Wolfebüttel (AB, sign. 1511 Theol.), Kopenhagen (Royal library, sign. 20223), Paris (National library, a.imp. 2956 or a. imp. 3596, together with Part 2), Rome (Vatican Library), (Note: Noted by Assemani in 1755.) Oxford (Bodleian library, N.T. slov. 1562 c. I), New York (Public Library, Lenox Collection, together with Part 2), (Note: Once owned by Augustus Frederick the Duke of Sussex.) 1 in personal library of Milan Rešetar in Florence. Part 2 in 1563 in 1000 copies. Known copies of Part 2 as of 1936 according to Bučar and Fancev: Ljubljana (Licej. bibl. sign. V. 3a 18.377, together with Part 1), Wrocław (Miejska Biblioteka, sign. 4. K. 160 together with Part 1), Kaliningrad (Konsistorij. bibl. sign. Cb 131. 4º I. 2, together with Part 1), Moscow (RGB inv. No 9376-9377 together with Part 1), Saint Petersburg (Library of the Russian Academy of Sciences No 1001-1002 together with Part 2; RNB Берч. 12 including 2 exemplars both with Part 2 as well), Graz (University library, sign. I. 742, together with Part 1), Vienna (National Library, together with Part 1 as 2. G. I; also BE I. N. 75 at the same library with just Part 2), Basel (University library sign. FG X^{2} 39-40, together with Part 1; also Frey.-Gryn. A. IV. 25, together with Part 2), Darmstadt (University and State Library, sign. V. 789 together with Part 1), Gotha (Vojvodska bibl., sign. Theol. 4. p. 39, together with Part 1), Halle (University Library, Jc. 7451), Kassel (University Library, sign. Bibl. Bohem. et Crobat., 4º, together with Part 1), British Museum (together with Part 1), Munich (LMU Munich's University library 4º bibl. 999 together with Part 2; Royal library 4B Rel. Croat. 15 Ka together with Part 2; State library together with Part 2), Munich (the same libraries with Part 1 also have Part 2), Paris (National library, a.imp. 2956 or a. imp. 3596, together with Part 1), Tübingen (University library, sign. G. a. XXVIII, I. 4º together with Part 1), Wittenberg (Vojvodska bibl.), Wolfenbüttel (HAB, sign. 1511 Theol., 2 copies, one with Part 1), (Note: The copy with sign. 1511 Theol. containing Part 1 and Part 2 was once in the possession of Maria Sophie of Braunschweig-Lüneburg.) New York (Public Library, Lenox Collection, together with Part 2), 1 copy in the antiquariat of Ludwig Rosenthal which sold both parts for 300 M. In Chicago, the Newberry Library has 1 copy (sign. Nr. 36, volume not specified by Kruming). In New Forest, the Broxbourne Library has 1 copy (volume not specified by Kruming). In Winterthur, the State Library has 1 copy (volume not specified by Kruming). Bibliography: | 924 (part 1 with 464, part 2 with 460) Bibliography: |
| 1563 (after June 16) | | Edna kratka summa | Anton Dalmatin and Stipan Istrian | Bad Urach | | 1000 copies printed. Known copies of Part 1 as of 1936 according to Bučar and Fancev: Ljubljana (NUK sign. V. 3. a. 19986), Basel (University library, sign. F. P. VI^{2}. 8º), Dresden (Royal library, sign. Lit. slav. 105), Hamburg (City library sign. A. L.), Jena (University library sign. Msc. Bos. 4º), Strassburg (University library), Stuttgart (Royal land library, sign. Wirt. R. 8º), Tübingen (University library, sign. G. f. 920. 8º). According to later sources, the only surviving copy was housed in SLUB (Lit. Slav. 9), destroyed in the Bombing of Dresden. The 1916 Fancev transliteration in Latinic survives. Bibliography: | 28? |
| 1563 | | Govorenje vele prudno (Trattato utilissimo del beneficio di Giesu Christo crocifisso verso i Christiani) | | Bad Urach | | 500 copies printed. Translation of Tratato utillissimo dell Beneficio di Giesu Chr. crocifisso verso i Christiani published 1543 in Venice. Surviving copies: 1 in Ljubljana (NUK, sign. 19896), Sopron (Evangélikus Egyházközség Könyvtára, sign. Ld - 786), 1 in Basel (University Library, sign. F. P. VI^{2}. 8º), 1 in Dresden (SLUB, sign. Lit. Slav. 105), 1 in Hamburg (Staatsbibliothek, sign. A. L.), 1 in Jena (University Library, sign. 8. Msc. Bos. 4º), 1 in Strasbourg (University Library), 1 in Stuttgart (Württembergische Landesbibliothek, sign. Wirt. R 8º), Tübingen (University Library, Gf 920 (R)). Bibliography: | 176 |
| 1563 | | Spovid ispoznanie prave krsztianszke vere | | Bad Urach | BSB ID 1735380 (BSB 19 November 2012) | Latinic except for Glagolitic transliteration table behind title page. | |
| 1564 | Crikvêni ordinalic | Crikvêni ordinalic (Red crkveni, Württembergische Kirchenordnung) | Juraj Juričić | Bad Urach | | 400 copies printed. 4 copies survive: 1 in the RGB in Moscow (inv. No 6610), (Note: Formerly in the Öffentl. Bibliothek. in Dresden as Lit. slav. III. 117. The copy is bound to the 1564 abecedary.) 1 in UB Stuttgart (Wirt. R. 8º), 1 in UB Tübingen (sign. G. F. 920. 8º), 1 for sale 1907 by Munich antiquarian Ludwig Rosenthal. Bibliography: | 220 |
| 1564 | Spovid općena | Spovid i Spoznanê prave karstiênske vire | Anton Dalmatin and Stipan Istrian | Bad Urach | | 400 copies printed. 2 copies survive: 1 in ÖNB (SA. 17. H. 15 or 15.490-A, bound to the Bramba, with 1978 microfilm in Državni arhiv u Karlovcu as FILM br. 23/3 and copy at HDA as G*-57 (ZM 57/18)), 1 for sale 1911 by Leipzig antiquarian O. Harassowitz now at the Evangélicus Gyülekëzet Kömyvtár in Sopron (Lc-789). Bibliography: | 229 |
| 1564 | Bramba augustanske spovedi | Bramba augustanske spovedi | Anton Dalmatin and Stipan Istrian | Urach | | 400 copies printed. 4 survive: 1 in the RGB in Moscow (inv. No 6609), (Note: Acquired from the SSB where it was kept as Df. 1584.) 1 in Sopron (Evangélikus Egyházközség Könyvtára, sign. Lc-789), 1 in ÖNB (15.490-A or 15490-A, formerly St. 17. H. 15, bound to Spovid), HAAB in Weimar (X. 63^{b}). Bibliography: | 614 |
| 1564 | | Probe sv. pisma iz Izajie proroka (Isaiah) | translator Leonard Merherič | Bad Urach | | Of 50 copies of Glagolitic example folio, none have survived according to Schnurrer 1799, Šafar̆ík 1864 and later authors. Bibliography: | 1 |
| 1565? | | Vsih prorokov stumačenje hrvatsko | | Bad Urach | | Prophets. Only Latinic survives, no explicit mention of Glagolitic edition but they may have printed one in the judgement of Bučar, contra Kruming. Kruming's conclusion that it was never printed may be reinforced by the apparent rarity of the Latinic edition. Luther's Enarratio Psalmorum LI et CXXX is another is another work for which Glagolitic, Cyrillic and Latinic editions may have been intended, but only a Latinic version was published in 1564 (in Italian). Bibliography: | 300? |
| 1565 | | Govorenje vele prudno (Beneficium Christi) | | | | The final Protestant Glagolitic book. Latinic with Glagolitic conversion table at end. Unknown run size. Only known surviving copy in Licejska knjižnica v Ljubljani (V. 3. a. 19897), bound to the Glagolitic version and the Italian Trattato utilissimo. | 1 |
| 1573, 2012 | | Les Chroniques et Annales de Poloigne | Blaise de Vigenere | Paris | M-6215 (BnF), GB | Latinic with Glagolitic abecedary on pages 2–3. Facsimile published 2012 in Paris. | 1 |
| 1579 | | molitve na hrvatskim' êziku | Ivan Haberman, printer Janez Mandelc | Ljubljana | | | |
| 1582 | | Epistole Sv. Pavla | Antun Dalmatin, Primož Trubar | Tübingen | | Few bibliographies list this. | |
| 1584, 1987 | Articæ horulæ succisivæ | Articae horulae succisivae (Zimske urice proste) | Adam Bohorič | Wittenberg | DKS | Latinic with Glagolitic on title page and Glagolitic abecedary on pages 16–18. The book was adapted and republished as Grammatica latino-germanico-slavonica in 1715 by Joannes Adamus Gaiger but without the Glagolitic. Slovene translation published 1987 in Maribor. | 1 |
| 1591 | | Bibliotheca Apostolica Vaticana a Sixto V | Angelo Rocca | Rome | GB, UCM | Latinic with Glagolitic abecedary on page 160-161. | 1 |
| 1596 | | Alphabeta et Characteres | Theodor and Johannes Israel de Bry | Frankfurt | Arsenal 8-BL-144 (BnF "Illyrian", BnF "Slavic", BnF "Croatian"), GB | Latinic with 3 Glagolitic abecedaries and 1 Pseudo-Glagolitic. | 1 |
| 1601, 1999 | | Il regno degli Slavi | Mavro Orbini | Pesaro | IA | Latinic with Glagolitic abecedary, which is absent from the 1638 poetic edition and from the 1722 Russian edition. Facsimile published 1985 in Munich. Croatian translation published 1999 in Zagreb including abecedary (IA). (Note: Not to be confused with translation of Juraj Bajractari of Požega, whose translation from Italian into Latin remains in manuscript form (NSK R 3558, R 3048). Or with the translation into Serbian published 1968 in Belgrade which does not include the relevant chapter.) | 1 |
| 1602 | | Diodochos id est svccessio | Bartoloměj Paprocký | Prague | | Latinic but includes facsimile of Glagolitic note from 1378 of knez Pavel the abbot called Nedvied. Bibliography: | 1 |
| 1613, 1711, 1729, 1799, 1824, 1966, 2012 | | Trésor de l'Histoire des Langues de cest Univers | Claude Duret | ... , Paris, London | 1613 (IA), 1711 /, 1729 /, 1799 (IA), 1824 (IA) | Latinic with 2 Glagolitic abecedaries. Both reproduced on page 329 of Volume 2 of 1711 edition of Imperium Orientale by Anselmo Banduri published in Paris, present in the 2nd edition published 1729 in Venice. One alphabet reproduced by Edmund Fry for Pantographia in London 1799. The same alphabet reproduced from Fry by John Johnson in Volume 2 of Typographia published 1824 in London, absent from the 1828 abridged edition and from the 1837-1864 revised editions by Thomas F. Adams published in Philadelphia. Both volumes of the 1824 edition were reprinted in 1966 by Gregg Press of London, and again by Cambridge University Press in 2012. A 1985 microform by Pergamon of Oxford. | 1 |
| 1628 | Nauk karstjanski | Dottrina christiana breve | Matija Divković | Rome | BSB ID 8449192 (MDZ 12 June 2014), R268 HAZU | The printing press of the Sacra Congregatio de Propaganda Fide used the Glagolitic type confiscated from the Protestants at Urach. Surviving copies: 1 in Zagreb (NSK, R II A-16º-4), 1 in Saint Petersburg (RNB, Берч. 13), 1 in London (British Library, 843. d. 9. (1)), 1 in Paris (Bibliothèque nationale, D. 25591 (1)), 1 in the Vatican Library. Bibliography: | 66 |
| 1629 and 1630 (August 16), 1693, 1773 | Azbukividnjak.djvu | Azbukividněk | Matija Divković | Rome | 1629-1630: UniWürz; 1693: RIIA-16°-1 (NSK, GHR), T 455 (S 1936) (NLP) | 2003 facsimile of original 1629 edition with analysis by Dorothea König open access. Copies of 1629 edition: 2 copies in Zagreb (HAZU, R 264; R 265), 1 copy in Ljubljana (NUK sign. 9963), 1 copy in Moscow (RGB, МК IV - лат. / 8° "Alphabetum Ibericum" (inv. МК VIII-21645)), 1-2 copies in Saint Petersburg (RNB, Берч. 15, bound to the 1635 Ispravnik; см. No 36 from M. P. Pogodin collection by gift of P. I. Šafarik), 1 copy in Lviv (Львівський Історичний Музей, No 260), 1 copy in Budapest (Országos Széchényi Könyvtár, L.Slav.609), 3 copies in Paris (Bibliothèque nationale, X. 16497 bis; Rés. X. 1169 (6); Rés. X. 2109), 1 copy in Vatican Library, 1 copy at Uppsala University Library, 2 copies at HAZU (R264, R265), 2 copies in London (British Library, sign. 621. c. 33. (2); sign. 1352. c. 1), 1 copy in Oxford (Bodleian Library, sign. 8° 141 Seld.). Copies of 1693 edition: 1 in Zagreb (HAZU, R14), 1 in London (British Library, 38. b. 31. (10)). Bibliography: | 31 |
| 1631, 1648 | Levaković missal | Missale romanum slavonico idiomate | Rafael Levaković, Bogdan Bakšić, Danijel Grozdek | Rome | GHR | On the initiative of Franjo Glavinić, language was made to conform to Russian Church Slavonic. Prepared from 3 manuscript missals (written 1387, 1402, 1435). Printing lasted 3 years. Surviving copies: 1 in Zagreb (NSK, R II A-4°-2), 1 copy in Novi Sad (Библиотека Матице српске, sign. 473389), 2 copies at Senj bishopric library (15.794/15.974, 16.409), 2 at HAZU (R582, R937a,b), 1 at Capuchin Monastery in Karlobag, 1 in Ljubljana (NUK, sign. 10056), 1 in Rijeka (Naučna biblioteka, R - 48), 1 in Krakow (Jagiellonian Library, sign. Lit. ros. 962 II), 1 in Saint Petersburg (BAN, sign. No 4068сп, which is a single folio bound in a copy of the 1741 missal), 4-6 in Moscow (RNB, 2 copies under Берч. 14^{a}, 2 copies under 14^{b}; 1 copy from Mihail Petrovich Pogodin collection given to Pogodin by Václav Hanka in Prague on 20 July 1840; 1 fragment of 21 leaves in Berčić collection acquired by Berčić in Rava from P. Mihovilović in September 1853), 1 in Budapest (Országos Széchényi Könyvtár, Hung. e. 4° 798/1), 1 in London (British Library, sign. C. 110. g. 3), 1 in Oxford (Bodleian Library, 4° A. 25. Th.), 1 in Paris (Bibliothèque nationale), 1 in Bloomington (Indiana University Library). Copies of the apparent 2nd edition from 1648, 1 at the Franciscan Monastery in Trsat donated by Darko Deković. Bibliography: | 806 |
| 1635 | Ispravnik za erei | Ispravnik za erei (Breve directorium sacerdotum et poenitentium of Juan Alfonso de Polanco) | translator Šime Budinić, Rafael Levaković | Rome | DIKAZ, BSB ID 1074574 (MDZ 22 June 2014), GHR | Surviving copies: 1 in Rijeka (Naučna biblioteka, R - 83), 2 in Zagreb (HAZU, R265; NSK R II A-8°-6), 1 copy at the Franciscan monastery in Trsat (M. v 10b, donated by Darko Deković), 3 at Beograd (Библиотека семинара српског језика Београдског универзитета, from the V. Jagić collection; Народна библиотека Србије, sign. С - II 3328; Универзитетска библиотека "Светозар Марковић", sign. Р 1524), 1-2 in Ljubljana (NUK, sign. 10017, 7728), 8 copies at Lviv (Львівська національна наукова бібліотека імені В. Стефаника, Ст. I - 3966/2 пр.; Ст. I - 3966/3 пр.; (Note: Both 3966/2 пр. and 3966/3 пр. were once property of metropolitan Andrey Sheptytsky.) Ст. I - 3966/4 пр.; Ст. I - 3966/5 пр.; Ст. I - 3966 without full signature; 3 copies without any signature; Національний музей у Львові inv. No 1215 (15216)), 3 in Moscow (GPIB, Отдел истории книги, собр. иностр. книг XVII в., 8° - 2700; (Note: In the A. D. Chertkov collection.) RGB inv. No 6605; (Note: Acquired from Nikolay Nikolaevich Birukov.) inv. No 6608), (Note: RGB inv. No 6608 from the В. И. Григорович collection.) 2 in Odesa (Одеська національна наукова бібліотека, 1-670; 1-9053), 3-8 copies at Saint Petersburg (BAN No 1133сп; 2 copies under RNB Берч. 15, one of which is bound to a copy of the 1629 abecedary and belongs to the M. P. Pogodin collection and was given to Pogodin by Šafarik; Берч. 15^{а}; Берч. 15^{б}; Берч. 15^{в}; Берч. 15^{г}; a fragment with pages 225–226 in the Берчић collection), 1 in Vilnius (Lietuvos mokslų akademijos Centrinė biblioteka), 1 in Budapest (University Library, sign. Ad 10597), 1 in Eger (Főegyházmegyei Könyvtár, I-IX-20), 2 copies at Cambridge (University Library), 2 in London (British Library, sign. 843 - d. 20; 1111 b. 11), 2 in the Vatican Library, 2 copies at Uppsala University Library (shelfmarks Ksl. 136 and Språkv. Kyrkoslav.), 1 in Chicago (Newberry Library), 1 in Washington (Library of Congress). Bibliography: | 296 |
| 1635 | | Naredbenik redovnikov' (Directorium Sacerdotum) | Stipan Matenica | Rome | | | |
| 1637 | | Ordo missæ | Rafael Levaković | Rome | | Kanonska tablica. Intended for use with the 1631 missal. The Vatican Library has 1 copy (Stamp. Chigi II 1080, int. 87, of which a photocopy F 228 was made in 1987, kept at the Staroslavenski institut). It is the only surviving copy. Bibliography: | 1 |
| 1648 | | Časoslovь rimskii slavinskimь êzikomь (Levaković breviary, Levakovićev brevijar) | Rafael Levaković, Methodius Terleckyj | Rome | RIIA-8°-2a (GHR) | The proposal to print a new Glagolitic breviary had been made in 1635 but the missal was not selling enough copies, so the final decision to finance the breviary was not made until 1642. Surviving copies: 2 in Rijeka (Naučna biblioteka, R 80; R 88), 2 in Zagreb (HAZU, R946; NSK, RIIA-8°-2a), 1 copy at Beograd (Библиотека семинара српског језика Београдског универзитета, from the V. Jagić collection; Народна библиотека Србије, sign. С - I - 780), 1 in Ljubljana (NUK, sign. 7510), 1-2 in Odesa (Одеська національна наукова бібліотека, 1-8805 (Псалтирь и коммунал); 1-9439 (темпорал и санкторал)), 6-7+ in Saint Petersburg (RNB, Берч. 16; Берч. 16^{д}; Берч. 16^{а}; Берч. 16^{б}; Берч. 16^{в}; Берч. 16^{г}; Берч. 16^{г}; Берч. 16^{e}; Берч. 16^{ж}; 186 leaves of fragments in the Berčić collection), 1 in Vienna (Institut für Slavische Philologie, sign. 32. A. 6), 1 at Firenze (Biblioteca nationale centrale), 1 copy at Vatican Library (C. III. 77), 1 copy at Milan (sign. S.Q.V.III.21, discovered by Aksinija Džurova in 2009/2010), 1 at Kopenhagen (Royal Library), 1 in Linz (Forschungsbibliothek), 1 in London (British Library, sign. 3395. bb. 13). Some cite a breviary by Levaković printed 1629. Bibliography: | 1703 |
| 1684 | | Daniels Copy-Book | Daniel Rich | London | Glagolitic Abecedary scanned by Žubrinić 1995. | Latinic with a Glagolitic abecedary and the Wyss abecedary. | 1 |
| 1688 | Paštrić breviary | Breviarium Romanum slavonico idiomate | Ivan Paštrić | Rome | RIIA-8°-3j (GHR), 50 MA 27611 (SBB 31 August 2020) | 2 copies in Senj bishopric library (15.945, 1 without inventory number), 1 in Rijeka (Naučna biblioteka, R - 59), 4 copies in Zagreb (HAZU R945a,b,c,d; 2 copies in the Knjižnica Staroslavenskog instituta, one of which is OR 76; (Note: OR 76 was discovered in 1987 during the restoration of S IIe-5/c,d.) NSK RIIA-8°-3), 1 in Novi Sad (Библиотека Матице српске, 461959), 1 copy or fragment at the Biskupija archive in Kopar (photocopy at Star. inst. as F 93). 1 copy at SBB in Berlin (50 MA 27611), 2 in Ljubljana (NUK, 10049; 10049 dupl.), 1 copy in Moscow (РГАДА, фонд 1250 (старопечатные книги МГАМИД), No 204), (Note: From the library of the МГАМИД director M. A. Obolensky) 8+ copies in Saint Petersburg (BAN, No 1203сп; (Note: From the library of P. A. Kulakovsky, acquired from Kukuljević in Zagreb on 7 June 1877.) RNB, 7 copies in Берч. 17; 39 leaves of fragments in the Berčić collection; Отдел рукописей, фонд 5757 (P. M. Petrov archive), No 564 is a fragment with pages 525–526), Yaroslavl (Яросла́вский госуда́рственный исто́рико-архитекту́рный и худо́жественный музе́й-запове́дник), 1 in Vienna (National Library, 15207 - B), 1 in Bologna (University Library), 1 in Firenze (Biblioteca nationale centrale), 1 in Vatican Library (C. V. 17), 1 in London (British Library, 3365. bbb. 12), 1 in Washington (Catholic University of America Library, Hyvernat Collection), 1 in Chicago (Newberry Library),. Bibliography: | 1138 |
| 1689, 1877, 1936? (or later?), 1951?, 1969, within 1971-1973, 1977?, 1978?, 1984, 1994, 2007?, 2012, 2017 | | Die Ehre des Herzogthums Crain Volume 6 (The Glory of the Duchy of Carniola, Čast in slava vojvodine Kranjske) | Johann Weikhard von Valvasor | Ljubljana, Novo Mesto | 2 Austr. 200 r-2 (MDZ 24 April 2018) | Latinic with Glagolitic abecedary on page 273 of Vol. 2 of original 1689 edition published in Ljubljana (500 copies), then again in 1877 edition published in Novo Mesto. The topographic section of the series had been reprinted in 1822 but does not seem to have included the abecedary. Partial translation by Marko Rupel published originally 1936, (Note: The 1st half was published 1936, but only 14 copies of the 2nd half were printed before the war stopped the printing.) then 1st complete edition 1951 in Ljubljana as Valvasorjevo berilo, including abecedary at least by 2nd edition expanded by Branko Reisp and published 1969. An adapted version of that translation was printed as Slava vojvodine Kranjske in 1977 and/through 1978, 1984, 1994, apparently 2007. Complete translation published as Čast in slava vojvodine Kranjske in Ljubljana 2012. Facsimile 1971-1973 in Munich and Ljubljana, again 2017 (2000 copies). The table may have also been part of the Iconotheca Valvasoriana, not published until 2004–2008 in Ljubljana (100 copies). Bibliography: | 1 |
| 1706 | | Missal rimskiĵ va ezik slovenskiĵ sazdan | Ivan Paštrić | Rome | RIIA-8°-14 (GHR), 50 MA 27600 (SBB 28 August 2020) | Redacted edition of 1631 missal. 80 surviving copies as of 2002. Surviving copies: 1 copy in Senj bishopric library (without inventory number), 2 copies in Zagreb (HAZU R940a,b,c; NSK RIIA-8°-14), 4 copies in Capuchin Monastery in Karlobag, 1 in Franciscan monastery in Dubrovnik (without signature), 1 in Beograd (Народна библиотека Србије, С - II 1601), 1 in Ljubljana (NUK 60127), 1 in Kijev (Львівська національна наукова бібліотека імені В. Стефаника, Ст.III - 1906), (Note: Once property of metropolitan Andrey Sheptytsky.) 2 in Saint Petersburg (BAN No 4069сп; RNB Берч. 18 with pages 267–272, 321–328, 603-604 copied by hand), 1 in Budapest ("NSK" (error for Országos Széchényi Könyvtár? or NSK in Zagreb?) Lit. 420 (Kol. 1)); 1 in Cambridge Massachusetts (Harvard University Library), 1 in Washington (Catholic University of America Library). Bibliography: s | 921 |
| 1707, 1767 | | Misse za umervšie samo iz missala rimskoga | | Rome | 1707: RIIA-8°-13 (NSK, GHR), 50 MA 27599 (SBB 2 June 2020); 1767: RIIA-4°-1a,b (NSK, GHR) | 2nd edition printed 1767. 1 copy at HAZU (R938a,b). 1 copy at SBB in Berlin (50 MA 27599). Surviving copies of 1707 edition: 1 in Belgrade (University Library, Р 65), 1 in Moscow (RGB, inv. No 6611), (Note: From the Rumyantsev museum.) 1 in Saint Petersburg (RNB, Берч. 19), 1 in Budapest ("NSK" (error for Országos Széchényi Könyvtár? or NSK in Zagreb?) Lit. 420 (Kol. 2)). Surviving copies of 1767 edition: 1 in Zagreb (NSK, RIIA-4°-1), 1 in Rijeka (Naučna biblioteka, R - 58), 1 in Saint Petersburg (Берч. 24), 1 in the Vatican Library. Bibliography: | 29 |
| 1713, 1715 | | The Lords Prayer In Above a Hundred Languages, Verſions, and Characters (Oratio Dominica) | Daniel Brown, John Chamberlayne | London | 1713 (IA), 1715 (GB) | Latinic with Glagolitic abecedary. 2nd edition published 1715. | 1 |
| 1721, 1733, 1940, 1965, 1975, 1993, 1999 | | Die wohleingerichtete Buchdruckerei | Johann Heinrich Gottfried Ernesti | Nürnberg | GB (1721), GB (1733) | Latinic with Glagolitic abecedary. Second edition published 1733. Facsimiles 1940 in Radebeul-Dresden, in Nürnberg in 1965 and 1975, in Zirndorf 1993, in Hildesheim 1999. | 1 |
| 1727 | | Origo characteris Sclavonici | Johann Leonhard Frisch | Berlin | GB | 4º. Latinic with Glagolitic abecedary. | 1 |
| 1739, 1753, 2005 | Bukvar 1753 | Bukvar slavenskij | Mate Karaman | Rome | 1739: R-632a (HAZU), GHR; 1753: R-634a (HAZU), GHR, Zm 1166<a> (SBB 2 June 2020) | 2nd edition 1753, unchanged from 1739. In the 1753 book, Karaman made known his intent to publish a Slavonic Grammar, but it was never published if it was written. Facsimile of 1753 edition published 2005. Surviving copies of 1739 edition: 1 in Zagreb (HAZU R 632), 1 in Belgrade (University Library, Р 226), 1 in London (British Library, sign. G. 16746. (2)). Surviving copies of the 1753 3dition: 2 in Zagreb (HAZU R 634; NSK), 2 in Beograd (Народна библиотека Србије, sign. С - II 2191; University Library Р 220), 1 in Novi Sad (Библиотека Матице српске, G. Mihailovich collection), 4 in Moscow (OGIM, Чертк. 465; (Note: Acquired from A. D. Chertkov.) RGB inv. No 5002; (Note: From the M. K. Bobrovskiy library.) inv. No 7727; (Note: With note of acquisition Ex libris Bronislai Epimachi-Schipillo.) МК Справ. Е.VI.1/8.2440), 1 in Odesa (Наукова бібліотека Одеського національного університету, Воронц. 4515 - 4515-a; Воронц. 8181), (Note: Both from the M. S. Voroncov library.) 6 in Saint Petersburg (RNB V.6.45^{а}; (Note: Once belonged to Alph. Pinart.) V.6.45^{б}; Берч. 22; (Note: From the library of count Jan Pieter van Suchtelen) Берч. 22^{а}; Берч. 22^{б}), 4 in Ljubljana (NUK, 5572; 9914; 18366; 20740), 1 in Eger (Főegyházmegyei Könyvtár, S-IX-29/coll. 2), 5 in London (British Library, G. 16833. (1); 621. b. 5. (1); 673. b. 12. (1); 622. f. 1. (3); 58. b. 31. (11)), 3 in Cambridge (University Library, sign. LE 6. 38^{2}; sign. Broxbourne, d. 26^{9}; Trinity College Library), 5 in Uppsala (University Library). Bibliography: | 38 |
| 1740, 1745? | | Die so nöthig als nützliche Buchdruckerkunst und Schriftgießerey | Christian Friedrich Gessner | Leipzig | DTA | 8º. Latinic with Glagolitic abecedary (pages 56–58) and the Pseudo-Glagolitic abecedary. At least two volumes of the multi-volume work were reprinted 1745. | 1 |
| 1741, 1754 | Synopsis Universae Philologiae | Synopsis Universae Philologiae | Gottfried Hensel | Nürnberg | 1741: (GB); 1754: L.gen. 41 (MDZ 22 July 2010) | Latinic with Glagolitic abecedary among plates at end. 2nd edition published 1754. Bibliography: | 1 |
| 1741 | Karaman missal | Missale romanum slavonico idiomate (Karamanov misal) | Mate Karaman, Matej Sović | Rome | RIIA-4°-3a (NSK, GHR), Odra (IzSt 2008), 4" Cl 13440 (SBB 31 August 2020) | About 80 copies survive as of Nazor 2002. Surviving copies: 2 copies at Senj bishopric library (15.724, 15.795), 1 at Capuchin Monastery in Karlobag, 1 folio found on 20 August 2012 by brother Kristijan Kuhar in the Samostan sv. Mihovila in Zaglav inside a Latin Missale Romanum from 1570 (2012 photocopy F 466 at Staroslavenski institut), 1 in Zagreb (Metropolitanska knjižnica MR 22169), 2 in Rijeka (Naučna biblioteka, R-33; R-49), 1 in Ljubljana (NUK, 9857), 1 copy at Odra in the Franciscan monanastery, 2 in Eger (Főegyházmegyei Könyvtár, Tt-IV-1 possibly of variant 2; R-V-2), 1 in Berlin (Deutsche Staatsbibliothek, C1 13440 4º), 1 in Chicago (Newberry Library). Copies of 1741 missal variant 1: 2 in Lviv (Львівська національна наукова бібліотека імені В. Стефаника, Ст. IV - 721/2 пр.; another copy under Ст. IV - 721), (Note: Both LNB copies were formerly in the A. S. Petrushevich museum.) 3 in Moscow (GPIB A 8 2/50; 45 1/12; RGB inv. No 7527), (Note: Both GPIB copies are in the A. D. Chertkov collection.) 1 in Zagreb (Knjižnica Staroslavenskog instituta, S II e 1 a). Copies of 1741 missal variant 2: 1 in Zagreb (Knjižnica Staroslavenskog instituta, S II e 1 b), 1 in Moscow (RGB inv. No 7523), (Note: From the library of baron D. G. Ginzburg.) 1 in Odesa (Наукова бібліотека Одеського національного університету, sign. 22/15), 2 in Saint Petersburg (RNB, 2 copies under Берч. 20; the Berčić collection also has a fragment of this missal of undetermined variant), (Note: One of the Berčić collection copies is bound with a manuscript containing the mass for Saint Simeon.) 1 annotated copy at Wrocław in the Biblioteka Universytecka (from which microfilm FILM br. 9/2 at Državni arhiv u Kralovcu and G*-45 (ZM 57/6) at HDA),, 1 in Szentendre (Српска црквено-научна и уметничка збирка, (А.С. 1045), London (British Library, 3395.ee. 14). Surviving copies of 1741 missal variant 3: 1 in Moscow (RGB inv. No 7524), 1 in Saint Petersburg (BAN No 4068-сп, in which pages 89–90 of a copy of the 1631 missal are bound). Bibliography: | 807 |
| 1741 | | Missi za umerršie | Mate Karaman, Matej Sović | Rome | | Title page identical to Missale romanum slavonico idiomate, but contents are masses for the dead. 2 copies at Senj bishopric library (15.721, 15.723). Bibliography: | 62 |
| 1741 | | Considerazioni | Mate Karaman | Rome | | 1 copy at Sarajevo in the Narodna biblioteka. Photocopy F 296 at Staroslavenski institut, microfilm FILM br. 22/2 at Državni arhiv u Karlovcu. | |
| 1742 (August 1) | | Пастырское послание от 1 августа 1742 г. духовенству и мирянам Абсорского епископства | Mate Karaman | Rome | | The sole exemplar is kept in Saint Petersburg at the RNB under Берч. 21. | 1 |
| 1743, 1748 | | A.b.c. Buch (later Orientalisch- und Occidentalischer Sprachmeister) | Johann Friedrich Fritz, Benjamin Schulze | Leipzig | 1743: GB; 1748: L.gen. 88 a (MDZ 12 December 2017) | Latinic with Glagolitic abecedary and Pseudo-Glagolitic abecedary. 2nd edition 1748. | 1 |
| 1750, 1761, 1766, 1824, 1836 | | Nouveau Traité de Diplomatique (Neues Lehrgebäude der Diplomatik) | Charles François Toustain, René-Prosper Tassin | Paris | 1750 GB | Latinic with Glagolitic abecedaries. German translation published 1761. Letters reprinted in Fournier 1766 and Johnson 1824. Also published in Kopitar 1836. | 1 |
| 1763 | Bukvar 1763 | Bukvar slavenskij | | Rome | R II A-16°-2 (GHR) | 3rd edition (Glagolitic only, without Cyrillic, but still largely unchanged). About 12 copies survive: 7 in Zagreb (HAZU R 646; NSK R II A-16°-2a; NSK R II A-16°-2b; NSK R II A-16°-2c; 149.464; R 310; Knjižnica Staroslavenskog instituta S II e - 12, of which a photocopy in Staroslavenski institut was made in 1991 and kept as F 247), 1 in Rijeka (Naučna biblioteka, R - 64), 1 in Ljubljana (NUK 9964), 2 in Saint Petersburg (RNB, 2 copies under Берч. 23). Bibliography: | 30 |
| 1763, 1766, 1772, 1772, 1783 | Encyclopédie | Caractères et Alphabets de Langues Mortes et Vivantes (in Recueil de Planches of Encyclopédie) | Denis Diderot, others, table drawn by Louis-Jacques Goussier | Paris, Lucca, Livorno, Geneva | UMich (Paris 1763), BnF (Paris 1763), BHL (Paris 1763), HT, GB (Paris 1763), IA (Lucca 1766), GB (Paris and Madrid 1783) | Part of the Encyclopédie, Plates Vo. 2, printed 1765 according to Peter Daniels, but 1763 according to Sebastian Kempgen. Latinic with Glagolitic abecedary and Hail Mary. Up to 4225 copies of first edition in Paris, and the abecedary plate was reprinted in: 1766 in Lucca (1500 plus 100 copies), 1772 in Livorno (1500 plus 100), 1772 in Geneva (2150), then in Panckoucke's Encyclopédie Méthodique printed in 5000 copies 1782-1832 (including Glagolitic abecedary at least in 1783 edition in plates Vol. 1), and maybe the Madrid and/or Padua editions of the Encyclopédie Méthodique, and maybe the Journal encyclopédique (1756–1793), and their reprints, editions and translations. Translations of the original were also made. Most reprints/editions lacked the Glagolitic abecedary: the Geneva and Neuchâtel edition, the Lausanne and Bern edition, the derivative Encyclopedia of Yverdon. | 1 |
| 1763 | | The Origin and Progress of Letters | William Massey | London | IA, HT | Latinic with Glagolitic abecedary. | 1 |
| 1764 | | Ordo missae | Antun Juranić, printer Demetrios Theodosius | Venice | | Kanonska tablica. In Russian Church Slavonic with Croatisms. The sole surviving copy is in the RNB as Берч. 30. Theodosius had intended to publish a Glagolitic breviary, but it was never printed. Bibliography: | 1 |
| 1765 | | Molitvi prežde i poslie misse glagolimiê, iz' missala rimskago | Antun Juranić, printer Demetrios Theodosius | Venice | RIIA-16°-8a (GHR) | Surviving copies: 1 in Zagreb (NSK, RIIA-16°-8a), 1 in Ljubljana (NUK 10030), 2 in Moscow (Научная библиотека МГУ, sign. 2 F c/9 or 2 Р c/9; (Note: From the A. I. Turgenev library.) RGB inv. No 6604), 2 in Saint Petersburg (BAN, No 3108сп; No 3383сп), 1 in Venice (Biblioteca nationale Marciana, D. 5528). Bibliography: | 118 |
| 1766, 1799, 1824, 1966, 1995, 2010, 2012 | | Manuel typographique (Vol. 2) | Pierre Simon Fournier | Paris | IA, 1799 page 22 (IA), 1799 page 160 (IA) | Latinic with Glagolitic abecedaries and Pseudo-Glagolitic abecedary (woodblock printing), from the printer who had in 1737 introduced the point system, and who contributed to the Encyclopédie the information on typefounding. Facsimile with English translation 1995 in London. Abecedaries reproduced by Edmund Fry for Pantographia published in London 1799. Facsimile 1970 in Los Angeles, 2010 in Charleston. One of Fry's abecedaries reproduced by John Johnson in Typographia published 1824 in London, absent from the 1828 abridged edition and from the 1837-1864 revised editions, but present in the reprints of the 1824 edition of 1966 and 2012. The 1930 and 1978 translations of Fournier do not include the relevant sections. Bibliography: | 1 |
| 1766 | | Molitvi prežde, i poslie Misse | Antun Juranić | Venice | | | |
| 1766 | | In originem et historiam alphabeti sclavonici glagolitici vulgo hieronymiani | Klement Grubišić, printer Jo. B. Pasquali | Venice | IA | Latinic with Glagolitic abecedary. | 1 |
| 1768, 1783, 2003, 2012 | | Kraynska Grammatika | Marko Pohlin | Ljubljana | GB (1768), DKS (1768), IA (1783) | Latinic with Glagolitic abecedary after forward. 2nd edition 1783. Facsimile 2003 in Ljubljana, 2012 in Charleston. | 1 |
| 1773 | | Predika od jedinstva u kerstênstvu, iz nimačkoga na ilirički prevedena | Adam Tade Blagoevič, printer Cath. C. Széch. | Vienna | | | |
| 1783 | Bukvar 1783 | Bukvar slavenskij | | Rome | | | 38 |
| 1788 | Bukvar 1788 | Bukvar slavenskij | Mate Karaman, Ivan Petar Galzigna, printer Antonio Fulgoni | Rome | RIIA-8°-1 (GHR), RIIA-16°-6 privez 1 (GHR) | Redaction of Karaman bukvar. 2 copies in Zagreb (HAZU R266; R647), 4 in Ljubljana (NUK 7723; 10001; 10103; 19884), 1 in Moscow (RGB, inv. No 6607), 4 in Saint Petersburg (RNB, Берч. 25^{г}; Берч. 25^{а}; Берч. 25^{б}; Берч. 25^{в}); 1 in Cambridge (University Library, sign. XV, 6. 37^{3}). Bibliography: | 31 |
| 1789 | | Missy svêtihь podь služimyê izvoleniemь Apostolskimь êko dolu, novo dopušteniê | | Rome (Propaganda fide) | | Second appendix to Missal of 1741 (first was printed in same volume as 1741 missal). 1 copy at Capuchin Monastery in Karlobag. Bibliography: | 32 |
| 1789 | | Erste Linien eines Versuches über der alten Slawen Ursprung, Sitten, Gebräuche, Meinungen und Kenntnisse | Karl Gottlob von Anton | Leipzig | GB | 2nd volume; 1st volume published 1783. Latinic with Glagolitic abecedary from page 103. | 1 |
| 1790 (after June 2) | | Privedry princip' činy znati s naredbom' (Naredbe privedrog principa) | translator Grigorij Ljubanović iz Pašmana, printers sons of Giovanni Antonio Pinelli | Venice | | 3 copies surviving: 1 in Library of Pavle Solarić in Venice (so Solarić 1810), 1 in the Vatican Library (so Köppen 1826), 1 in the Library of Ivan Kukuljević Sakcinski. All are lost as of Kruming 1998. Bibliography: | 12 |
| 1791 | Karaman breviary | Breviarium Romanum slavonico idiomate (Karamanov brevijar) | Mate Karaman, Matej Sović, Ivan Petar Galzigna, Antun Juranić | Rome | HAZU, GHR, GHR, GHR, GHR (Čast lêtnaê); Čast lêtnaê: Cl 14050-2 (SBB 2 June 2020); Čast zimovaê: /; Čini svêtih: Cl 14050-2 (SBB 2 June 2020); | Three parts: Čast zimovaê (Pars hiemalis), Čast lêtnaê (Pars aestiva), Čini svêtih (Officia Sanctorum). The printing of this breviary had been slowed by the resignation of its sponsor patriarch Carlo Camuzi in 1776. Surviving copies of Č. zimovaê: 2 in Senj (bishopric library, 15.943; 15.946), 1 in Karlobag (Capuchin Monastery), 1 in Ljubljana (NUK 39116 together with č. l.), 2 in Moscow (Библиотека иностранной литературы им. М.И. Рудомино, R Яб-222/В-846, inv. No 627690; GPIB sign. A 26 3/2 together with Č. l.), 1 in Odesa (Наукова бібліотека Одеського національного університету, sign. 22/58 together with Č. l.), 1 in Saint Petersburg (RNB, Берч. 28-2), 1 in Prague (Knihovny fakulta Ustavy Univerzity Karlovy, together with Č. l.), 1 in Krakow (Jagiellonian Library, sign. Lit. ros. 369 II together with Č. l.), 1 in Vienna (National Library, 18-R-2, together with Č. l.), 1 in Berlin (Deutsche Staatsbibliothek, sign. Cl 150 50 together with Č. l.), 1 in Schwarzau (Parmaache Herzogliche Bibliothek, together with Č. l.), 1 in the Vatican Library (B. VII. 82 - 84, together with Č. l.), 1 in Bloomington (Indiana University Library), 1 in Chicago (Newberry Library), 1 in London (British Library, 3405. ff. 6 together with Č. l.), 1 in New York (Public Library), 1 in Philadelphia (Divinity School of the Protestant Episcopal Church, together with Č. l.). Surviving copies of Č. lêtnaê: 4 in Senj (bishopric library, 15.942; 15.947; 15.948; 15.949), 4 in Zagreb (HAZU, R-943; R-1025; Sv. Ksaver Monastery, bound with Čini svêtih; NSK R II A-8°-5), 1 in Novi Sad (Библиотека Матице српске, sign. 461994), 1 in Ljubljana (NUK 39116 together with č. z.), 1 in Prague (Knihovny fakulta Ustavy Univerzity Karlovy, together with Č. z.), 2 in Moscow (GPIB, sign. A 26 3/2 together with Č. z.; RGB inv. No 8442), 1 in Odesa (Наукова бібліотека Одеського національного університету, sign. 22/58 together with Č. z.), 1 in Saint Petersburg (RNB, Берч. 28-1), 1 in Krakow (Jagiellonian Library, sign. Lit. ros. 369 II together with Č. z.), 1 in the Vatican Library (B. VII. 82 - 84, together with Č. z.), 1 in Vienna (National Library, 18-R-2, together with Č. z.), 1 in Berlin (Deutsche Staatsbibliothek, sign. Cl 150 50 together with Č. z.), 1 in Schwarzau (Parmaache Herzogliche Bibliothek, together with Č. z.), 1 in Chicago (Newberry Library), 1 in London (British Library, 3405. ff. 6 together with Č. z.), 1 in Philadelphia (Divinity School of the Protestant Episcopal Church, together with Č. z.). Surviving copies of Čini svêtih: 2 in Senj (bishopric library, 15.941; 15.950), 3 in Zagreb (HAZU, R-685; Sv. Ksaver Monastery, bound with Čini svêtih; NSK R II A-8°-4), 1 in Ljubljana (NUK 34150), 2 in Moscow (GPIB, sign. A 26 6/10; OGIM, sign. Чертк. 595), (Note: Both GPIB A 26 6/10 and OGIM Чертк. 595 are from the library of A. D. Chertkov.) 1 in Odesa (Наукова бібліотека Одеського національного університету, sign. 22/21), 1 in Saint Petersburg (RNB, Берч. 29), 1 in Cambridge Massachusetts (Harvard University Library), 1 in Chicago (Newberry Library), 2 in London (British Library, 3465. g. 13; 3405. ff. 8). Bibliography: | 1482 (Č. l.), 1467 (Č. z.), 270 (Č. s.) |
| 1793 | | Grammatica Illyricae juventuti Latino, Italoquae sermone instruendae accomodata | Josip Jurin | Venice | RIIC-8°-191 a (NSK) | Latinic with Glagolitic alphabet tables at end. The author Josip Jurin was a Franciscan friar born 16 October 1730 in Primošten, who probably finished grammar school and theology in the Zadar seminary. He became a friar in 1753 and finished his novitiate 1754 on Visovac. He studied philosophy in 1755 in Živogošće, and in 1756 he was a member of the Franciscan monastery in Dobri (Split). But after that he soon became a student in Italy. In 1765, he was the magister juvenum on Visovac, and in 1766 he became the teacher of the students of the monastery sv. Lovre in Šibenik, remaining there until his death, with a journey to Italy in 1775. Surviving copies: 1 in Zagreb (NSK, RIIC-8°-191), 1 in Moscow (GPIB, Отд. истории книги, инв. ОИК 62042), (Note: From the A. D. Chertkov collection.) 1 in London (British Library, 1188. bb. 9), 1 in Venice (Biblioteca San Francesco della Vigna, inv. ANT 1002, collocazione BIBLIOTECA ZC III 003, alternate sign. 15218 v. 3), 1 in Vicenza (Biblioteca civica Bertoliana, inv. 192465, collocazione D 006 008 019). 1 is for sale at the Barac&Pervan auction house (Aukcija br. 56, Catalog No 532, at which it did not sell). Bibliography: | 3 |
| 1793 | | Alphabeti Illyrici | Josip Jurin | Venice | | A separate printing of the alphabet tables from his Grammatica Illyricae juventuti Latino, on 16 pages. 1 surviving copy in Moscow, in the GPIB (Отд. истории книги, инв. ОИК 62401). Bibliography: | |
| 1700s (end) | | Канонические таблицы | | Rome (Propaganda Fide) | | Not to be confused with the 1764 tables. Only 1 copy survives, in the RNB in Saint Petersburg (Берч. 31). | |
| 1700s (end) | | Мессы на пять венецианских праздиков | | Rome (Propaganda Fide) | | Only 1 copy survives, in Saint Petersburg (RNB, Берч. 27). | 4 |
| 1700s (end) | | Мессы на праздики Пресвятого Имени Исусова и Защищения святого Иосифа Обручника | | Rome (Propaganda Fide) | | Only 2 copies survive: 1 in Samobor (Zbirka Ivana Sudnika), (Note: Once owned by Strjepan Hrčić of I Neručićeva 1a in Zagreb.) 1 in Saint Petersburg (RNB, Берч. 27). | 4 |
| 1700s (end) | | Месса: День 23 Иануариа | | Rome (Propaganda Fide) | | Only 2 copies survive: 1 in Samobor (Zbirka Ivana Sudnika), 1 in Saint Petersburg (RNB, Берч. 27). | 4 |
| 1700s (end) | | Мессы на два венецианских праздика | | Rome (Propaganda Fide) | | Only 2 copies survive: 1 in Samobor (Zbirka Ivana Sudnika), 1 in Saint Petersburg (RNB, Берч. 27). | 4 |
| 1700s (end) | | Мессы на праздикики Пресвятого Сердца Исусова и Пресвятого Искупителя | | Rome (Propaganda Fide) | | Only 1 copy survives, in Saint Petersburg (RNB, Берч. 27). | 4 |
| 1700s (end) | | Мессы на праздикики Святого Имени Блаженой Девы Марии и Пресвятого Розария Блаженой Девы Марии | | Rome (Propaganda Fide) | | Only 1 copy survives, in Saint Petersburg (BAN, No 4068сп, bound to a 1741 missal). | 4 |
| 1700s (end) | | Мессы на два венецианских праздика: Преславного Материнства Блаженой Девы Марии и Чистоты Блаженой Девы Марии | | Rome (Propaganda Fide) | | Only 2 copies survive, both in Saint Petersburg (BAN, No 4068сп, bound to a 1741 missal; RNB, Берч. 27). 1775,  Giovanni Bernardo Rossi, Epithalamia Exoticis Linguis Reddita, Parmae: ex regio typographeo (for the weding of the Crown Prince of Piedmont Carlo Emanuele of Savoy and Maria Clotilde of France); printer and punchcutter Giambattista Bodoni: 25 inscriptions in different exotic languages. Glagolitic is under the name "Inscriptio Illyrica, Charactere Hieronymiano". | |
| 1807, 1832, 1836 | 1806, Giambattista Bodoni,  Oratio Dominica CL linguis versa, et propriis cuiusque linguae characteribus plerumque expresa - ex editioneS. C. de Propaganda Fide, Rome   Illirico di S. Geronimo | Glagolitica | Josef Dobrovský | Prague | 1807: L.rel. 2644 v (MDZ 20 March 2019), L.rel. 516 (MDZ 25 May 2011), Lw 1092 (MDZ 26 June 2017); 1832: /; 1836: L.rel. 516 a (MDZ 25 May 2011) | Latinic with Glagolitic reproductions added. | 1 (1807) / 2 (1836) |
| 1812 | Bukvar' slavenskij triazbučnyj | Bukvar' slavenskij triazbučnij | Pavle Solarić | Venice | GB | Cyrillic with Glagolitic abecedary on pages 115–117, extended on pages 121–125, and with numbers on 127 and sample text on 127–128. Solarić made it clear in his 1810 publication that he intended to print a second edition, but it never came. Surviving copies: 1 in Belgrade (Народна библиотека Србије, sign. С - II 1185), 1 in Novi Sad (Библиотека Матице српске), 1 in Ljubljana (NUK 7139), 1 in Odesa (Наукова бібліотека Одеського національного університету, sign. 23/82), 3 in Moscow (OGIM, Щап. 949; (Note: From the collection of P. V. Shchapov, who acquired it from O. M. Bodyanskiy in 1839 in Pest.) Чертк. 104; RGB inv. No 9513), 1 in London (British Library, 869.h. 29). Bibliography: | 10 |
| 1818 | | | Josef Dobrowský | | | At the National Museum in Prague, sign. 1 D c 1/31 is a lithograph by Dobrovsky with a Glagolitic text and abecedary. The Glagolitic text is a facsimile of the Cerroni fragment (now in the Moravský zemský archiv v Brně, sign. Cerr II, č. 159). | |
| 1822, 1995 | | Institutiones linguae slavicae dialecti veteris | Josef Dobrovský | Vienna | MDZ | Latinic with Glagolitic abecedary on page 5 and ligature table on page 69. Facsimile with translation 1995 in Ljubljana. | 1 |
| 1836 | | Glagolita Clozianus | Jernej Kopitar | Vienna | GB (1836) | Latinic with Glagolitic abecedaries, transcriptions and alternate subtitle. 1860 edition lacked Glagolitic. | 2 |
| 1842, 1844, 1847, 1850, 1852, ?, 1856, 1859, 1861 1864, 1870, 1873, 1880, 1906, ... 2012, 2013, 2014, 2016, 2017, 2018, 2019 ... | | Alphabete orientalischer und occidentalischer Sprachen | Friedrich Ballhorn | Leipzig | GB (1847), GB (1850) GB (1852), IA (1859), IA (1859), IA (1861), GB (1864), GB (1870), IA (1873), IA (1880) | Latinic with 2 Glagolitic tables. First published 1842, a 2nd edition was published in 1844, a 3rd in 1847, 4th in 1850, 5th in 1852, 6th in ?, 7th in 1856, 8th in 1859, 9th in 1864, 10th in 1870, 11th in 1873, 12th in 1880, 13th in 1893 and 14th in 1906. It was reprinted by DOGMA in 2012 (ISBN 978-3-95507-168-4), by the Salzwasser Verlag in 2013 and 2014 (facsimile of 1859 edition), by Hansebooks in 2016, and by Creative Media Partners in 2019, among other reprints. Reworked into English as Grammatography, first published 1861 in London. Reprinted by Kemble Press in 1983 and again in 1995 and in 1997, by Hansebooks in 2017, by Forgotten Books and by Hansebooks in 2018, among others. | 1 |
| 1843 | | Evangelica slavice quibus olim in Regum Francorum Remensis, vulgo Texte du Sacre | J. D. Silvestre | | | | |
| 1846 | | Sazavo Emauskoê svêtoê blagovêst'tovaniê ninêže remskoê na neže prêže prisêgoše pr'i vênčal'nom mir'opomazanii cari Francousti | Václav Hanka | Prague | | | |
| 1847 (August) | | Sprachenhalle (The Hall of Languages) | Alois Auer | Vienna | hardcover edition ÖNB | Latinic but in the second half called Das Vater Unser in mehr als 200 Sprachen und Mundarten mit Originaltypen there is first a Glagolitic Lord's Prayer under Europa, then a Glagolitic abecedary on the first table of Die Schriftzeichen des gesammten Erdkreis. A separate softcover edition also exists (ÖNB). Part of the Great Exhibition in 1851. | 1 |
| 1847 | | Істория восточно-славенскогъ богослуженія и кѵріллскогъ кньижества кодъ славена западне цркве | Aleksander Stojanković | Novi Sad | GB | Cyrillic with Glagolitic abecedary on page 155. | |
| 1853 | | Iz'bor' glagol'skih' drevle pisanii (Památky hlaholského písemnictví) | Pavel Jozef Šafárik, printer Bohumil Haase | Prague | IA | Latinic front matter and rubrics, but Glagolitic alternate title, Glagolitic abecedary on page 6, Glagolitic corrigenda on pages 28–29 and 64 pages of Glagolitic transcriptions. | 67 |
| 1855 | | Božestveniê služba | printer Haase | Prague | | | |
| 1855 | | О времени происхождения славянских письмен | Osip Maksimovich Bodyanskij, printer Университетская типография | Moscow | PrLib, IA | Glagolitic possibly on plates (which may be missing in scans). | |
| 1857 | | Glagolitische Fragmente | Pavel Jozef Šafárik | Prague | MDZ | Latinic with Glagolitic transcriptions. | 10 |
| 1858 | | Über den Ursprung und die Heimath des Glagolitismus | Pavel Jozef Šafářik | Prague | MDZ | Latinic with Glagolitic abecedary. | 1 |
| 1859 | Chrestomathia 1859 | Chrestomathia linguae veteroslovenicae | Ivan Berčić, printer Teofil Haase | Prague | GB | | 56 |
| 1860 (December 14) | | Misi za umr'šee | Ivan Berčić, printer Dragutin Antun Parčić | Galovac | DIKAZ | Printed by Parčić with his own press. | 4 |
| 1860 | Bukvar staroslovenskoga jezika glagolskimi pismeni | Bukvar staroslovenskoga jezika glagolskimi pismeni za čitanje crkvenih knjig | Ivan Berčić, printer Bogumil Haase | Prague | MDZ, GHR | Second part includes print with Glagolitic caption by Parčić in Zadar 1863. | 65 |
| 1860 | | Bibliografija Hrvatska | Ivan Kukuljević Sakcinski, press of Dragutin Albrecht | Zagreb | GB | First part of series Bibliografija Jugoslavenska. Latinic with Glagolitic bibliography. Facsimile published 1974 in same volume as 1863 supplement. | 7 |
| 1861 | | Notes, Ecclesiological and Picturesque, on Dalmatia, Croatia, Istria, Styria, with a Visit to Montenegro. | John Mason Neale | London | IA | Latinic with Glagolitic abecedary. | 1 |
| 1863 (October 20) | | Bibliografia hrvatska. Dodatak k prvom dielu. | Ivan Kukuljević Sakcinski, press of Antun Jakić | Zagreb | GB | Supplement to 1860 bibliography. Facsimile published 1974 in same volume as 1860. | 1 |
| by 1863 | | obrazac mise za Kêsara i Kralja našego i Decretum | Dragutin Parčić | Zadar | | A lithograph. | |
| 1863 | | Listine hrvatske (Acta croatica) | Ivan Kukuljević Sakcinski | Zagreb | ZF 94(497.5)(093) LIST k (NSK), 990037661740203941 (HT), (IA), 014341207 (Oxf) | Mostly Glagolitic with Latinic preface and rubrics. In London there is 1 copy at the Bodleian Library (Aleph System Number 014341207) In Zagreb there is 1 copy in the NSK (155.122), 1 in the Gradska knjižnica (sign. ZF 94(497.5)(093) LIST k), 1 in the Knjižnica Staroslavenskog instituta (S II f-4). 1 copy at Harvard University (HOLLIS no. 990037661740203941). | 275 |
| 1864 (December 1) | | obrazac mise na blagdan Bezgrešnoga začeća | Dragutin Parčić | Krk | | A lithograph. | |
| 1863 | | Na uspomenu tisuću-godišnjice sv. Cyrilla i Methoda, slovjenskih apostolah | Ivan Tkalčić | Zagreb | GHR | Latinic with Glagolitic transcriptions and Glagolitic abecedary at end. | 6 |
| 1864, 1865, 1866 | Ulomci svetoga pisma | Ulomci svetoga pisma | Ivan Berčić | Prague | Part 1: GB, Part 2: GB, Part 3: /, Part 4: GHR, Part 5: GB | Parts 1, 2, 4 published 1864, 3 published 1865, 5 published 1866. Admittur and Imprimatur dates vary by copy. Other sources give different printing dates. | 151 (1), 161 (2), 121 (3), 132 (4), 139 (5) |
| 1864 | | Priměri starohèrvatskoga jezika iz glagolskih i cirilskih književnih starinah: sastavljeni za sedmi ì osmi gimnazijalni razred (Dio pèrvi) | Vatroslav Jagić, printer Antun Jakić | Zagreb | IA | Latinic with Glagolitic transcriptions and more pages of Cyrillic transcription. | 9 |
| 1864, 1866 | | Priměri starohèrvatskoga jezika jezika iz glagolskih i cirilskih književnih starinah: sastavljeni za sedmi ì osmi gimnazijalni razred | Vatroslav Jagić | Zagreb | 1864 (IA, GHR), 1866 (GHR) | Part 1 published in 1864, Part 2 in 1866. Latinic with Glagolitic transcriptions and more pages of Cyrillic transcription. | 9 |
| 1865 | | Assemanov ili Vatikanski evangelistar | Vatroslav Jagić | Zagreb | MDZ | Transcription and analysis of Codex Assemanius. Glagolitic with Latinic preface and rubric. | 245 |
| 1868 | | Gradja za glagolsku paleografiju | Vatroslav Jagić | Zagreb | GHR | Latinic with Glagolitic abecedary and transcriptions. | 7 |
| 1870 | | Dvie službe rimskoga obreda za svetkovinu svetih Ćirila i Metuda | Ivan Berčić | Zagreb | Liturg. 48 (MDZ 27 October 2010) | With Latinic title and preface. | 30 |
| 1870, 1984 | | Oratio dominica in CCL linguas versa (The Lord's Prayer in 250 Languages) | Petro Marietti | Rome | 1984 (GB) | Latinic with 4 Glagolitic abecedaries. Facsimile 1984 in Evanston (1000 copies), possibly reprinted multiple times at the same house "Brain Books". | 2 |
| 1875-1892 (within) | | Vsklik (Prigodnica) | Dragutin Antun Parčić | Glavotok | | The NSK in Zagreb has 1 copy R II A-4°-4. | |
| 1873, 1877, 1878 | | Grammatica della lingua slava (illirica) | Dragutin "Karlo" Antun Parčić, editor Spiridione Artale | Zadar | 1873 (GB), 1878 (GB) | 2nd edition 1878. Latinic with Glagolitic abecedary, absent from 1877 French edition. Possible 1874 edition. | 1 |
| 1879 | | Quattuor evangeliorum codex glagoliticus olim Zographensis nunc Petropolitanus | Vatroslav Jagić | IA (1879), IA (1954) | | Latinic front matter and rubrics and Cyrillic transcription, but Glagolitic alternate title and Glagolitic abecedary. Reprinted 1954 in Graz | 1 |
| 1870s | | Pêsan (translation of Jam lucis orto sidere, Se svita zvizdi v'sijavši), Slog sv. Tomi iz' Akvina k' sv. Evharisti, Nic' ti se klanam, Božestvo tajnoe | Dragutin Parčić | Glavotok | | Translations of hymns printed at Glavotok by Parčić. | |
| 1880 | | Vь blagopolučьni dьnь 4 ijunie 1880 vьnže presvetьli i prečьstьni gospodь Frane Feretiĉ sede na stolьcь biskupii krьčьkoi | Dragutin Parčić | Rome | GHR | A poem in honour of the naming of doctor Franjo Anijan Feretić bishop of Krk. Printed by Dragutin Parčić at the Propaganda de Fide. | 2 |
| 1880 | | Das Buch der Schrift enhaltend die Schriften und Alphabete aller Zeiten und aller Völker des Erdkreises | Carl Faulmann | Vienna | IA | Latinic with Glagolitic abecedary. | 1 |
| 1881 | | Prilog rimskom misalu slovenskim jezikom (Prilogь Rimьskomu misalu slovênьskimь ezikomь) | Dragutin Parčić | Rome | | Parčić's edition of the masses absent from the 1741 missal (the first edition of this portion was printed 1787). Printed by Parčić with his own press according to Lokmer 2008 or by the Propaganda at the expense of the Franciscan Province of the Third Order according to Nazor 1978. 1 copy at HAZU (R934), 1 copy at Capuchin Monastery in Karlobag., 1 copy at NSK (R II A-4°-3a. Bibliography: | |
| 1881 (by September 15) | | Činь i pravilo misi (Ordo et Canon Missae) | Dragutin Parčić | Rome | GHR | Printed by Parčić with his own press. Not printed in 1882 contrary to some sources. 1 copy at HAZU (R935a), 1 copy at Capuchin Monastery in Karlobag. | 24 |
| 1882 | | Образцы языка церковнославянского по древнейшим памятникам глаголической и кирилловской письменности | Vatroslav Jagić | Saint Petersburg | eTomsk | Cyrillic with Glagolitic abecedary and transcriptions. | 28 |
| 1882 | | Memoria sulla conversione dell'alfabeto glagolito | Frane Bulić | | GHR | Latinic with a Glagolitic abecedary. Printed both standalone and in November 1882 as part of Katoločka Dalmacija br. 70, 3 (possibly without abecedary). | 1 |
| 1883 | | Quattuor evangeliorum versionis palaeoslovenicae codex marianus glagoliticus | Vatroslav Jagić | Saint Petersburg | IA | Latinic front matter and rubrics and Cyrillic transcription, but Glagolitic abecedary. | 1 |
| 1883 | | The History of the Alphabet (Vol. 2) | Isaac Taylor | New York | IA (1883 page 196), IA (1883 page 203), IA (1899 page 196), IA (1899 page 203) | Latinic with 2 Glagolitic abecedaries. 2nd edition in 1889. | 1 |
| 1890 | | Glagolitica. Würdigung neuentdeckter Fragmente. | Vatroslav Jagić | Vienna | GHR | Latinic with many Glagolitic transcriptions, facsimiles, letter forms. | 15 |
| 1893/1894 | | Mali Azbukvar | Dragutin Parčić | | | | |
| 1893 (January 22), 1894, 1896, 1905, 2011 | | Rimьski misalь slavênskimь ezikomь | Dragutin Antun Parčić | Rome | 1893 (DKS, GHR), 1896 (GHR, 1905 / | Parčićev misal (Parčić missal). Type made by Parčić. 400 copies sold. Three editions: 1893 (part in 1894), 1896, 1905. Third edition posthumously published by Josef Vajs, reprinted in 2011 in Podgorica. Succeeded in most parishes by Latinic script Vajs missal (IA), complete with a conversion table (IA) to aid the transition. 1893 edition had 300 printed copies by autumn of 1890 in the first run, to which the second run had added 200 copies by the end of the year. 100 more copies were printed by the end of printing the 1st edition on 2 February 1893. In September a 2nd edition was ordered, published 1896. A revised edition was ordered to force conformation to the Vulgate, but the result was full of errors so Josef Vajs was called in to correct the text, and this edition was published in 1905. Reprinted 2011 in Podgorica. Some sources only mention 500 copies for the 1893 edition, others such as Nazor only 300, others 400. Some sources following Tandarić mention an 1894 edition, which may or may not be the same as the 1896 edition. As of 2012, 86 copies of the 1st edition are known to survive, 12 of the 1896 edition, 28 of the 3rd edition. As of Nazor 2002, about 86 copies of first edition survive, along with 9 of the 2nd edition and 28 of the 3rd. 1 copy is in Žman (župni ured). 1 copy is in Lovreć (with autogram of the Bar archbishop Šimun Milinović). Bibliography: | 775 |
| 1893, 1894 | | Misi za umr'šee (Missae in agenda defunctorum) | Dragutin Parčić | Rome | GHR | Some printed 1893, some 1894. 1 copy printed 1893 in Karlobag (supplied in 1895 by the guardian, father Josip) and 1 copy printed 1894 at Capuchin Monastery. | 25 |
| 1893 (late) | | Ritual (Rimski obrednik) | Dragutin Parčić | Rome | | | |
| 1893? | | Sacrum convivium | Dragutin Parčić | | | | |
| 1894 | | Glagoljske kanonske tablice | Juraj Posilović | Rome (Propaganda Fide) | | Written 20 April 1894 by Juraj Posilović. | |
| 1900 | | Borba za glagoljicu | Ivo Prodan | Zadar | Part 1: GHR, Part 2: / | Part 1 includes Glagolitic inscription on diptych and abecedary. | 1 |
| 1903 | | Recensio croato-glagolitici fragmenti verbenicensis | Josef Vajs | Krk (town) | IA | Parallel Glagolitic and Cyrillic transcription with critical apparatus. Bibliography: | 17 |
| 1903 | | Liber Iob | Josef Vajs | Krk (town) | | | |
| 1905 | | Tri glagolske mise | Josef Vajs | Prague | | | |
| 1905 | | Liber Ruth | Josef Vajs | Krk (town) | | | |
| 1905 | | Liber Ecclesiastis | Josef Vajs | Krk (town) | | | |
| 1905 | The Lord's prayer in five hundred languages | The Lord's prayer in five hundred languages | Reinhold Rost | London | "Bulgarian Glagolitic" (IA), "Croatian Glagolitic" (IA) | Latinic with the Lord's prayer in rounded and angular Glagolitic. The previous 2 editions lacked Glagolitic, but Gilbert & Rivington Ltd. had procured the typefaces necessary. | 1 |
| 1907 | | Vesperal rimsko-slovenski | Josef Vajs, printer A. Wiesner | Prague | NSK, GHR | Glagolitic title, rest Latinic. 1 copy at Capuchin Monastery in Karlobag. | 1 |
| 1908 | | Грамматика древняго церковно-славянскаго языка | Yefim Karsky | Warsaw | | Cyrillic with Glagolitic abecedary included at least by the 13th edition in 1908. | 1 |
| 1908 | | Propheta Ioel | Josef Vajs | Krk (town) | | | |
| 1909, 1917 | | Abecedarium Palaeoslovenicum in usum glagolitarum | Josef Vajs | Krk (town) | 1909: IA, 4 L.rel. 652 p (MDZ 6 February 2012), ? (Kodeks 2007); 1917: / | Latinic with pages of Glagolitic abecedary and selection of facsimiles. Reprinted 1917. | 45 |
| 1910 | | Propheta Oseas | Josef Vajs | Krk (town) | IA | Latinic with Glagolitic facsimile and Cyrillic transcription. | 8 |
| 1911 | | Grafika u Slavjan' | Vatroslav Jagić, Victor Emil Gardthausen | Saint Petersburg | GHR | Cyrillic with many Glagolitic transcriptions, facsimiles, letter forms. | 55 |
| 1911 | | Хрестоматія | Nikolai Mikhailovich Karinsky | Saint Petersburg | | A Glagolitic abecedary on page XI of Volume 1 of this otherwise Cyrillic book was added to the 2nd edition in 1911 that had not been part of the 1904 original. | |
| 1911 | | Энциклопедія славянской филологіи: Графика у славян. | Vatroslav Jagić | Saint Petersburg | eGPIBR | Vol. 3 of encyclopedia. Cyrillic with Glagolitic abecedaries, transcriptions and facsimiles. | 50 |
| 1912 | | Altkirchenslavische Grammatik | Václav Vondrák | Berlin | IA, OstDok | Latinic with Glagolitic abecedary. | 1 |
| 1912 | | Propheta Habacuc | Josef Vajs | Krk (town) | | | |
| 1913 | | Sophonias-Haggaeus | Josef Vajs | Krk (town) | | | |
| 1914 | | Penije rimskago misala po izdanju Vatikanskomu | Josef Vajs | Rome | | | |
| 1915 | | Zacharias-Malachias | Josef Vajs | Krk (town) | IA | Parallel Glagolitic and Cyrillic transcription with critical apparatus. | 20 |
| 1916 | | Psalterium palaeo-slovenicum croatico-glagoliticum (Staroslovenski psaltir hrvatsko-glagolski) | Josef Vajs | Krk (town) | Kra5 | Latinic with Glagolitic facsimiles. | 88 |
| 1918 and/or 1920, 1967 | | Учебник русской палеографии | Vyacheslav Nikolaevich Shchepkin | Moscow | eGPiB (1918/1920) | Cyrillic with Glagolitic abecedary. Reprinted 1967 as Русская палеография. | 1 |
| 1919 | | Misi slavnije o Bl. Marii djevi i za umršeje obetnije slovenskim jezikom (Missae solemnes nec non de Beata et de Requiem votivae e Missali Romano Slavonico) | Josef Vajs | Prague | | In volume 6 of Operum Academiae Velehradensis. Printing press "Politika". | |
| 1920 (after January 27) | | Predslovie na Misah za umršee | Josef Vajs | Prague | | Printing press "Politika". One copy in Senj bishopric library inside a copy of the Misi za umr'šee of 1894 (15.973). | 6 |
| 1920 | | Slovenski psaltir (Psalterii Paleoslovenici Quinquagena prima) | Josef Vajs | Prague | | | |
| 1922 | | Službenik | Josef Vajs | Prague | | (only the word “Služebnikъ” is in Glagolitic: ) | |
| 1927 | | Vajsov misal | Josef Vajs | Rome | | The Parčić missal transliterated into Latinic, but the Pravilo misi (Canon Missae, Čin mise) is in both Latinic and Glagolitic. | |
| 1928, 1979 | | Slavyanskaya kirillovskaya paleografiya. | Yefim Karsky | Leningrad, Moscow | | Cyrillic with Glagolitic abecedary. Reprinted in Moscow 1979. | 1 |
| 1932 | | Rukověť Hlaholské Paleografie | Josef Vajs | Prague | IA, Kra5 | Latinic with Glagolitic abecedaria and other content, including facsimiles. | 70 |
| 1939 | | Staroslovjenski jezik s hrvatskosrpskom redakcijom za V razred srednjih škola | Stjepan Bosanac, Sreten Živković | Zagreb (press of St. Kugli) | | Latinic with Cyrillic and Glagolitic abecedary with two texts. Approved by the decision (Note: Decision IV br. 55711.) of the Minister of Education of the Kingdom of Yugoslavia as a private press textbook for middle schools, valid through the school year 1942/1943. Approved as a temporary school book by the decision of ban Ivan Subašić br. 40.33 on 17 July 1940. The book taught Cyrillic but only gave Glagolitic for the sake of example. | 2 |
| 1940 | | Die westlichen Grundlagen des glagolitischen Alphabets | Michael Hocij | Munich | IOS | Latinic with Glagolitic abecedaries. | 3 |
| 1948 | | Kroz istoriju pisanja | Zvonimir Kulundžić | Zagreb (Zadružna štamparija) | | Latinic with Glagolitic abecedary and 2 sample texts. | 1 |
| 1950 (June 10) | | | Vladislav Cvitanović | Veli Iž | | First Glagolitic stamp of don Vladislav Cvitanović on letter regarding his Popis glagoljskih kodeksa. Kept at Staroslavenski institut as Ms 7. | |
| 1950 (June 14) | | | Vladislav Cvitanović | Veli Iž | Second Glagolitic stamp of don Vladislav Cvitanović on letter regarding his Popis glagoljskih kodeksa. Kept at Staroslavenski institut as Ms 7. | | |
| 1951 | | Staroslavjanskij jazyk | Afanasij Matveevich Selishchev | Moscow | | Cyrillic with Glagolitic abecedary. | |
| 1952 | | | | Zagreb | | Trial pages of the "Ognjen Priča" press in Zagreb with the lead letters of Dragutin Parčić. The Parčić letters had been used by the Staroslavenska akademija u Krku until 1952 when they were given to "Ognjen Priča" for it to print the works of the new Staroslavenski institut u Zagrebu. They found the letters were damaged and incompatible with the newer printing technology of their press, so they were taken to be melted down. These trial folia are all that remain from the Parčić prints of that press. They were given by Vjekoslav Štefanić to the Knjižnica Staroslavenskog instituta on 15 October 1962. Now kept as OR 69. | 16 |
| 1957 | | Soupis staroslovanských rukopisů Národního musea v Praze | Josef Vajs, Josef Vašica, František Michálek Bartoš | Prague (ČSAV) | | Latinic with Glagolitic abecedary. | |
| 1956 | | Русская палеография | Lev Vladimirovich Cherepnin | Moscow | | Cyrillic with Glagolitic abecedaries. | 2 |
| 1963 | | Staroslavjanskij jazyk | A. I. Gorshkov | Moscow | | Cyrillic with Glagolitic abecedary. | |
| 1982 | | Glagoljski natpisi | Branko Fučić | Zagreb | GHR | Latinic with Glagolitic facsimiles, transcriptions. | |
| 1983 (November 16) | | Ručni glagoljski otisak | Frane Paro | | | A printed page from a reconstructed manual press kept at the Staroslavenski institut in the OR fund (without signature). | 1 |
| 1993, 1994 (2), 1995, 1996, 2001, 2002, 2004, 2006, 2008, 2010, 2011, 2012, 2013, 2014, 2015, 2016, 2017, 2018, 2019, 2020, 2021, 2022 ... | | Ⰱⰰⱋⰻⱀⰰ (Bašćina) | editors Vladimir Ćepulić, Tomislav Galović, Maca Tonković | Zagreb | Number: 1, 2, 3, 4, 5, 6, 7, 8, 9, 10, 11, 12, 13, 14, 15, 16, 17, 18, 19, 20, 21, 22, 23 ... | Periodical with Glagolitic and Latinic mixed. | 8-15 originally, 30+ from 2012 on |
| 1998 (October 10) | | Сводный каталог старопечатных изданий глаголического шрифта 1483/1812 гг. | Andrey A. Kruming, artist A. N. Buromenskij, redactor V. E. Melĭnikova, technical redactor A. N. Bolobueva | Moscow | | Cyrillic with Glagolitic facsimiles and an abecedary. Contains a catalogue of Glagolitic printed books through 1812. Printed in 200 copies by the Russian National Library. | 20 |
| 2014 | | Hrvatski crkvenoslavenski jezik | Sofija Gadžijeva, Ana Kovačević, Milan Mihaljević, Sandra Požar, Johannes Reinhart, Marinka Šimić, Jasna Vince | Zagreb (Hrvatska sveučilišna naklada) | | Latinic with Glagolitic mixed. | |

== See also ==
- List of Glagolitic inscriptions
- List of Glagolitic manuscripts
