= University of Stuttgart Library =

Academic library in Germany

- Universitätsbibliothek Stuttgart
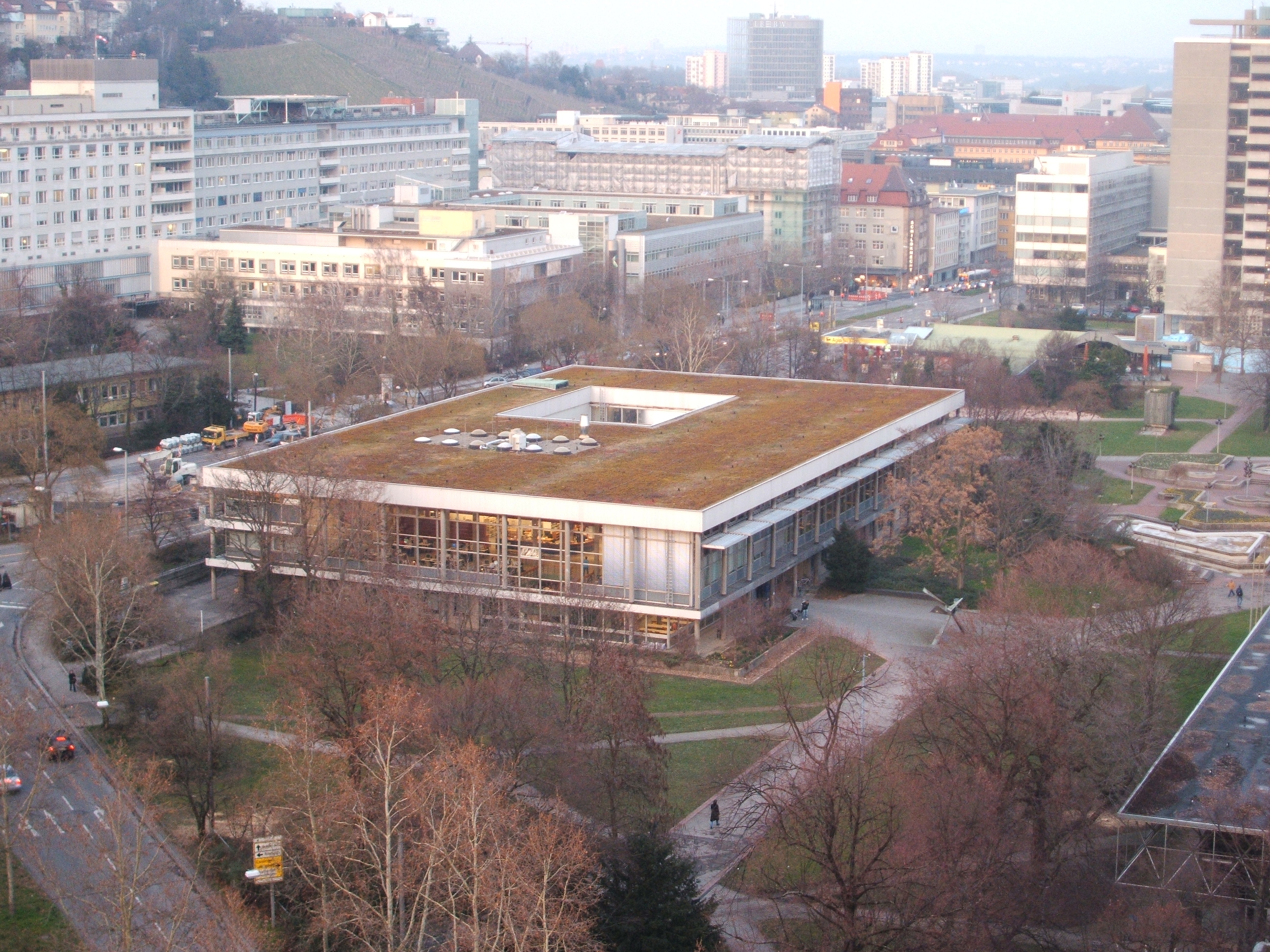
- Library building in city centre 2007
- 48°46′55″N 9°10′18″E
- Location: Stuttgart, Germany
- Established: 1829; 197 years ago
- Service area: Stuttgart and Tübingen Interlibrary loan region

Collection
- Items collected: books, magazines (both print and digital)
- Size: 1,650,000
- Criteria for collection: scientific literature, all publications published in Stuttgart

Access and use
- Access requirements: Students and employees of University of Stuttgart, also people, who study, live or work for at least 3 months in Stuttgart or in interlibrary loan region

Other information
- Website: ub.uni-stuttgart.de/en/

The University of Stuttgart Library (Universitätsbibliothek Stuttgart) is the central academic library of the University of Stuttgart and forms part of the Information and Communication Centre (IZUS). With its two main sites in Stuttgart city centre and Stuttgart-Vaihingen, as well as 115 departmental and faculty libraries, it constitutes one of the largest library systems in Baden-Württemberg. It provides faculty members, researchers and students of the university's 10 faculties and 150 institutes with literature and digital resources. The library is also open to interested individuals outside the university.

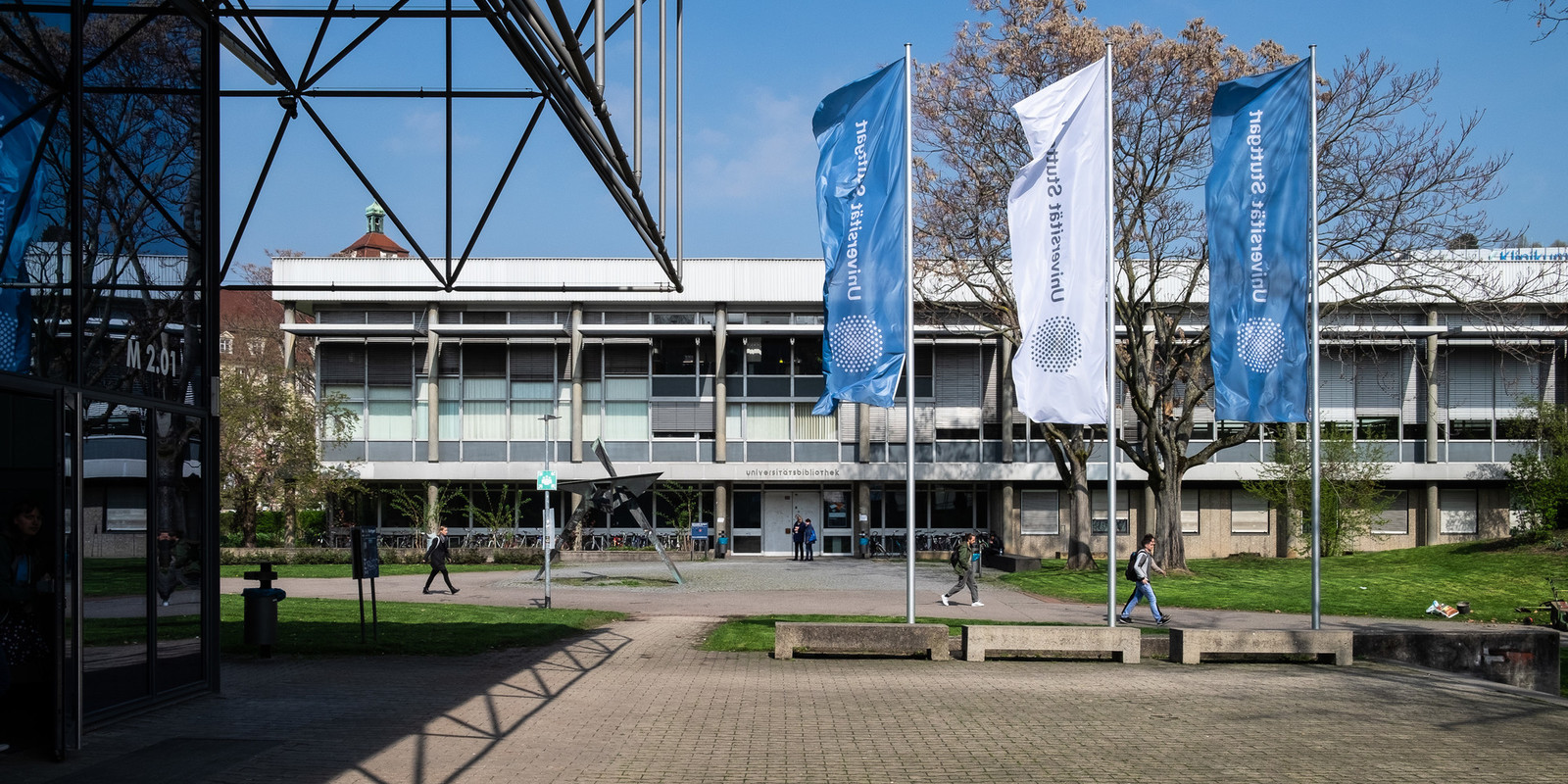
Entrance of the University Library (City Center)

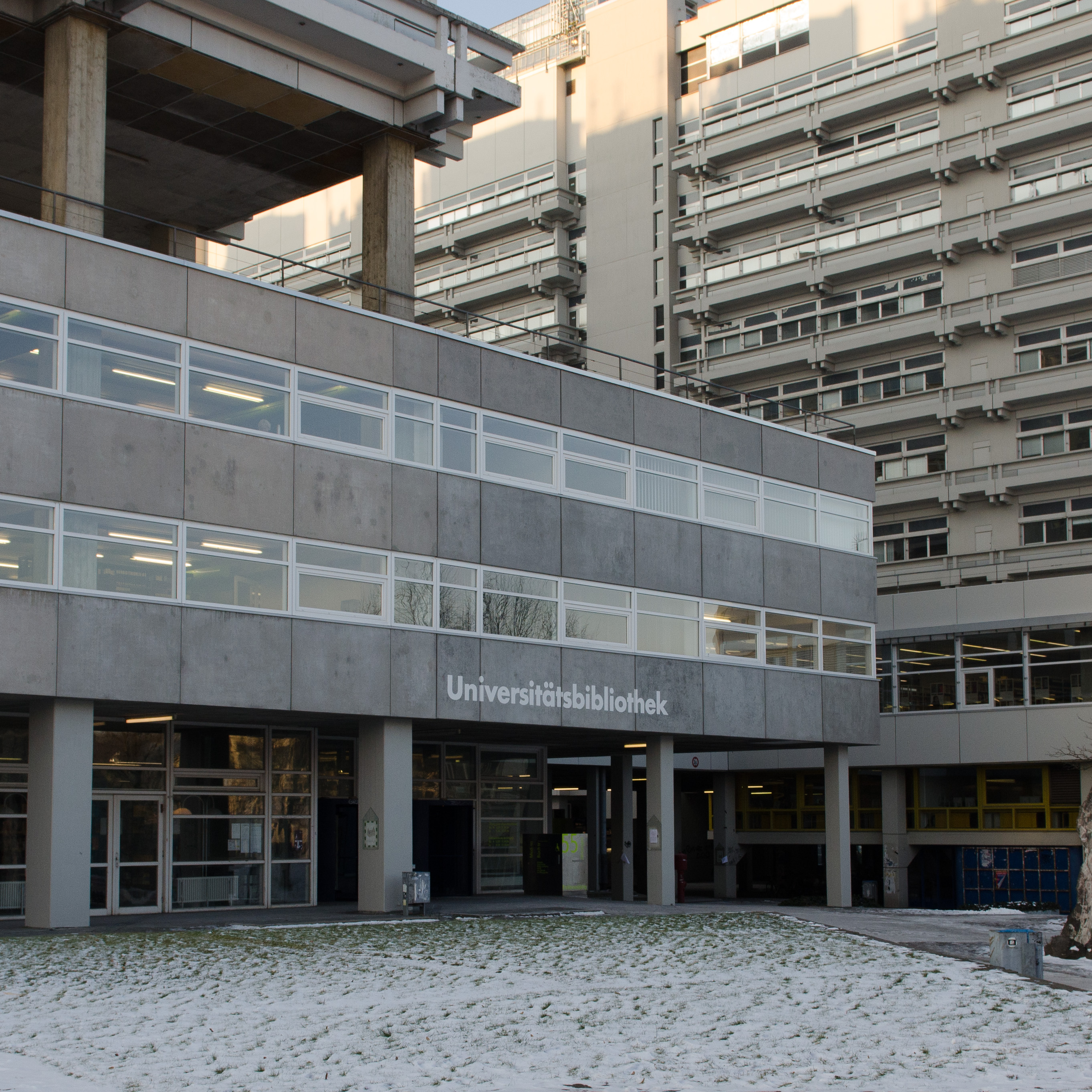
Entrance of the University Library (Stuttgart-Vaihingen)

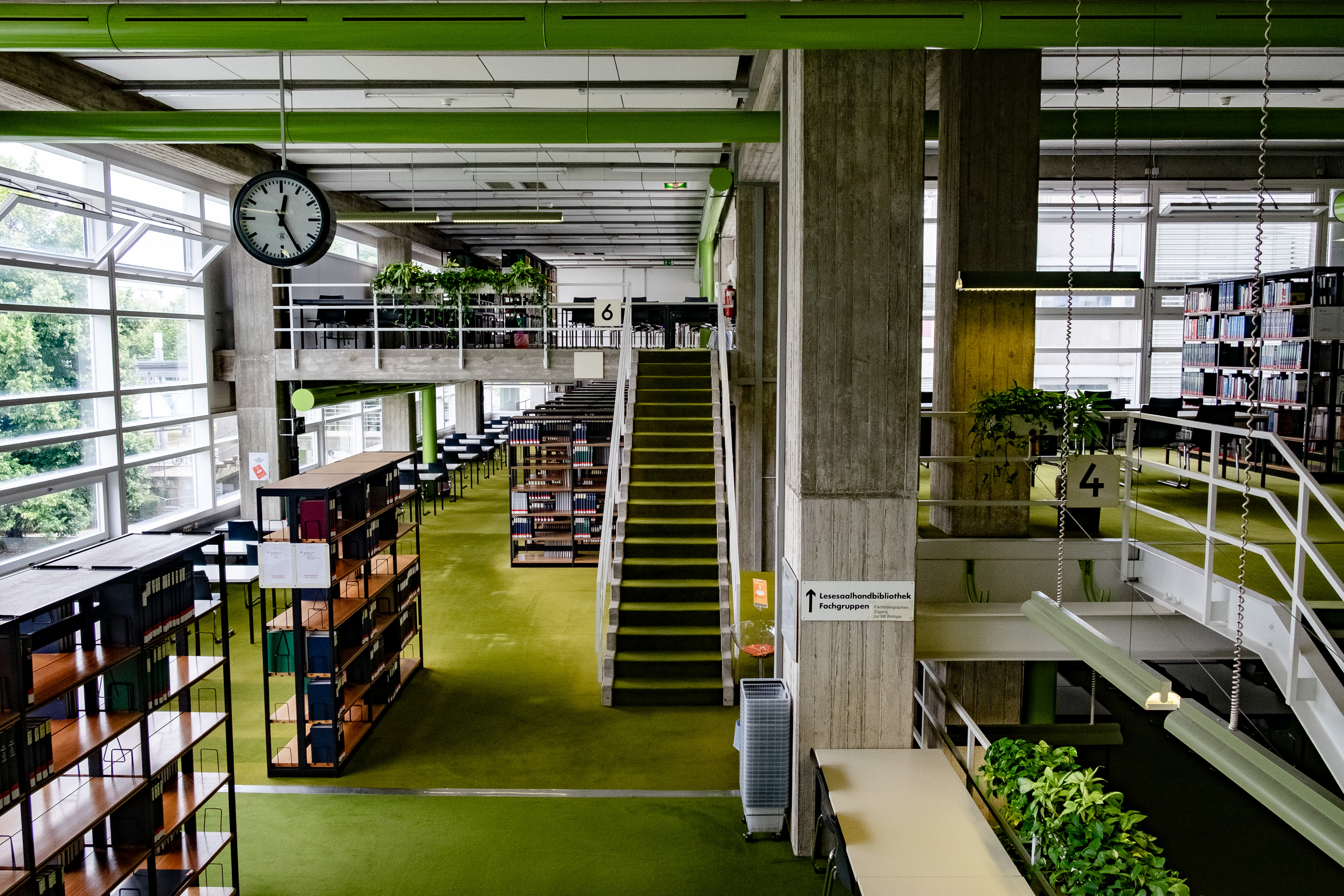
Reading Room in Vaihingen

== History ==
=== Foundation and early development ===
The roots of Stuttgart University Library date back to 1829, when the library was founded in Stuttgart city centre as part of the United School of Art, Secondary Education and Trade (from 1876: Stuttgart Technical University (German: Technische Hochschule Stuttgart); from 1967: University of Stuttgart). The historic site in the city centre has been the library’s main location ever since.

With the expansion of the university from 1957 onwards to the second campus in Stuttgart-Vaihingen, a second University Library site was established. Since then, the distribution of the collection between the two sites has been based on the academic departments located there: whilst the city centre site primarily houses literature on architecture, the humanities, social sciences and economics, as well as older works on the natural sciences and engineering, the Vaihingen site focuses on computer science, the natural sciences, engineering, technology and sports science.

=== Modern Development and Digitisation ===
In 1961, with the support of the Max Kade Foundation, the Technical University Library was given its own building, which was designed and built by the architects Volkart and Zabel. This building displays typical features of early 1960s library architecture, which was influenced by American models. The architects and library management were inspired, amongst other things, by the Price Gilbert Memorial Library at the Georgia Institute of Technology, a fact that is still evident today in the similarity of the reading rooms.

Since 2007, Stuttgart University Library has been successfully involved in national and international externally funded projects, particularly in the areas of repository software (e.g. OPUS), Open Access and research data management (e.g. BW-eLabs).

The merger of the University Library, the Computer Centre, the High-Performance Computing Centre and the IT department of the central administration to form the Information and Communication Centre (IZUS) took place in 2012. IZUS is divided into two divisions with distinct areas of responsibility. One division comprises the University of Stuttgart’s library system. This consists of the University Library, which serves as the university’s central library, and the libraries of the other institutions. The other division of IZUS comprises the university’s technical information and communication services (TIK), which, amongst other things, provide services for server and workstation systems, as well as for networks and communication systems.

In order to preserve its older holdings and make them accessible to the public, the University Library is systematically digitising them using the Goobi software. In 2015, the University Library of Stuttgart’s digital collections went online. In addition, the academic publication management system PUMA was introduced that year.

In 2017, the Learning Centres (“Lernwelten”) opened on the Stadtmitte and Vaihingen campuses, featuring modern group and individual study spaces as well as presentation rooms. The following year, the University Library began its involvement in the University of Stuttgart’s Research Data Competence Centre (FoKUS), and the University Library building in the city centre was added to the list of cultural monuments of the State of Baden-Württemberg.

On the evening of 18 August 2023, a cable fire broke out at the University Library’s Stadtmitte site as a result of a technical fault. The smouldering fire was brought under control before closing time, but the building subsequently had to be temporarily taken off the mains for technical inspections. The consequences of the incident have since led to considerable restrictions on library operations. Since early 2026, the reading room has been closed to the public, and the library’s stacks have been relocated to Weilimdorf. Currently, only the ground floor is open; as an interim solution, this houses the book lending service as well as individual and group study spaces for users. A complete refurbishment of the University Library building is planned for the coming years.

=== Directors ===
- Paul Gehring (1933–1952)
- Manfred Koschlig (1953–1971)
- Jürgen Hering (1974–1996)
- Werner Stephan (1998–2014)
- Helge Steenweg (2014–2024)
- Cristina Mehl (2024–)

== Collections and Services ==
The University Library of Stuttgart holds more than 1.6 million physical items, over 37,000 electronic journals and over 210,000 e-books. All items can be searched for via the library’s online catalogue.

The University Library’s collection is tailored to the University of Stuttgart’s key areas of study and research and comprises scientific, technical and humanities literature from the fields of mathematics, computer science, physics, chemistry, engineering, architecture, sport and health sciences, nutritional sciences, environmental sciences, life sciences, economics, as well as the humanities and social sciences. In addition, the University of Stuttgart has an extensive network of departmental libraries (115 as of 2025). These are spread across the university’s two campuses in Stadtmitte and Vaihingen and serve individual faculties and departments. The collections of the departmental libraries can, in most cases, only be accessed on-site.

=== Open Access (OA) ===
As early as 2011, the University of Stuttgart published an Open Access policy, which was supplemented in 2026 by a statement on Open Science at the University of Stuttgart. In order to make research findings – which are made possible in part by public funding – available to society, the University Library provides comprehensive support to members of the university in publishing academic works via Open Access. This includes publication advice for students and researchers, financial support for OA publications through the coverage of publication costs via the Open Access Publication Fund, and agreements with publishers. In addition, the University Library of Stuttgart’s OPUS publication server can be used for secondary publications. The Library also participates in open access initiatives and has successfully secured third-party funding for various projects in this field in recent years. Researchers at the University of Stuttgart also have the option of hosting their own open-access journals at the University Library. Open Journal Systems (OJS) is used as the software platform. The Journal of Technical Education (JOTED) has been published in this way since 2013, and the Journal of Competences, Strategy & Management (JCSM) since 2021. In addition, the University Library of Stuttgart hosts further open-access journals, such as Horizonte – Neue Serie. Zeitschrift für Italianistik and the Journal of Data- and Knowledge-integrated Simulation Science (JoDaKISS), though these two are not hosted via OJS.

=== Research Data Management (RDM) ===
Research Data Management (RDM) at the University of Stuttgart is centrally supported by the Competence Center for Research Data Management (FoKUS), which is jointly operated by the University Library and the University’s TIK (Technical Information and Communication Services Center). FoKUS serves as the central point of contact for researchers on all matters relating to the life cycle of research data. The FoKUS team provides assistance with data management plans (DMPs), requirements set by third-party funding bodies (such as the DFG or BMBF), as well as with long-term storage, management and legal issues. The University of Stuttgart offers its own data repository, DaRUS, as a storage location. It enables members of the university to archive, share and publish research data, lecture notes and code. Datasets are tagged with standardised metadata to ensure they remain permanently discoverable, citable and reusable.

=== Digital Collections ===
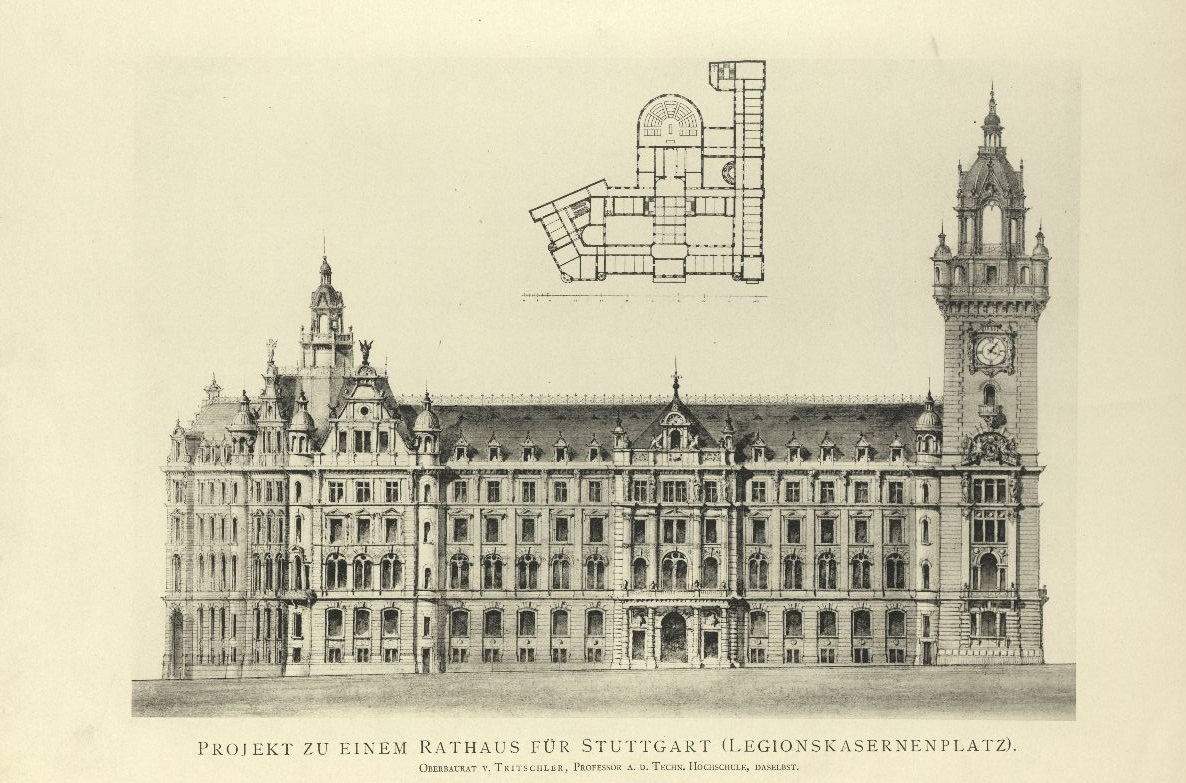
Draft for Stuttgart's new City Hall (19th-century), Digital Collections, Stuttgart University Library

The University Library’s digital collections were first published in October 2015. On this platform, the University Library makes high-resolution digitised materials available. The collections presented include architectural drawings, early printed books, mathematical models, 3D models, artefacts from the history of science and more. In addition, as part of the ‘books on request’ scheme, users have the option of having objects that have not yet been digitised, as well as older items from the University Library’s collections and holdings, digitised.

=== OPUS ===
With the OPUS (Online Publications of the University of Stuttgart) publication server, the University Library of Stuttgart offers researchers at the University of Stuttgart an open-access repository for the electronic publication of their works. The OPUS software of the same name was originally developed at the University Library.

=== PUMA ===
The academic publication management platform PUMA was introduced in October 2015. The web application is based on the open-source software BibSonomy and can be used by all members of the university community as an online reference management system.

=== University Bibliography ===
The University Bibliography was published in 2016. The database is maintained online in PUMA. The University Bibliography also enables open-access publication monitoring, whereby the proportion of open-access publications within the university’s total output is regularly determined.

=== University Archives ===
The Stuttgart University Archives is a department of the University Library. The University Archives preserve documents, files, photographs, digital files and collections relating to the history of the University of Stuttgart, its institutes and its members. It safeguards and preserves materials worthy of preservation from all university departments, collects estates and compiles press cuttings on institutions, individuals and events. In addition to sources of information on old student registers, student registers, staff registers and course catalogues, the University Archives also contain estates of professors and students, documents from student groups and various collections (including posters, photographs, lecture notes from the 19th and 20th centuries, as well as press cuttings and printed material on institutions, individuals and events relating to the University of Stuttgart).

== Literature ==
- Christiane Rambach, Frank Wiatrowski: Cultural Monument University of Stuttgart Library. Functional. Flexible. Transparent, Universitätsbibliothek Stuttgart 2020, doi:10.18419/opus-11203
- Christiane Rambach, Universitätsbibliothek Stuttgart, in: Stadtarchiv Stuttgart (Hg): Digitales Stadtlexikon, published 23 June 2022.
- Werner Stephan (ed.): 50 Jahre Neubau Universitätsbibliothek Stuttgart 2011. bearbeitet von Christiane Rambach, Ottmar Pertschi, Stuttgart 2011, ISBN 978-3-926269-33-1.
- Werner Stephan, ed. (2005), Universitätsbibliothek Stuttgart – Die Dienstleistungen (in German), Stuttgart: Universitätsbibliothek, ISBN 978-3-926269-05-8, nbn:de:bsz:93-opus-25193
- Werner Stephan, ed. (2009), Bibliotheken in Stuttgart: Bearbeitet von Ottmar Pertschi (PDF) (in German) (8. ed.), Stuttgart: Universitätsbibliothek, ISBN 978-3-926269-05-8, Format: PDF
- Manfred Koschlig, ed. (1962), Die Bibliothek der Technischen Hochschule Stuttgart 1962: Mit einer Darstellung ihrer Geschichte von Paul Gehring (in German), Stuttgart: Universitätsbibliothek
