= Gaspar Gil Polo =

Spanish novelist and poet

Gaspar Gil Polo (c. 1540 – 1591 was a Spanish novelist and poet, born in Valencia.

He is often confused with Gil Polo, professor of Greek at Valencia University between 1566 and 1573; but this professor was not named Gaspar. He is also confused with his own son, Gaspar Gil Polo, the author of De origine et progressu juris romani (1615) and other legal treatises, who pleaded before the Cortes as late as 1626.

A notary by profession, Polo was attached to the treasury commission which visited Valencia in 1571, became coadjutor to the chief accountant in 1572, went on a special mission to Barcelona in 1580, and died there in 1591. Timoneda, in the Sarao de amor (1561), alludes to him as a poet of repute; but of his miscellaneous verses only two conventional, eulogistic sonnets and a song survive.

Polo finds a place in the history of the novel as the author of La Diana enamorada, a continuation of Montemayor's Diana, and perhaps the most successful continuation ever written by another hand. Cervantes, punning on the writer's name, recommended that the Diana enamorada should be guarded as carefully as though it were by Apollo himself; the hyperbole is not wholly, nor even mainly, ironic.

The book is one of the most agreeable of Spanish pastorals; interesting in incident, written in fluent prose, and embellished with melodious poems, it was constantly reprinted, was imitated by Cervantes in the Canto de Caliope, and was translated into English, French, German and Latin.

The English version of Bartholomew Young, published in 1598 but current in manuscript fifteen years earlier, included both Montemayor's original and Gil Polo's continuation. Yong's translation is said to have suggested the Felismena episode (originally in Montemayor) in The Two Gentlemen of Verona; the Latin version of Kaspar von Barth, entitled Erotodidascalus (Hanover, 1625), is a performance of uncommon merit, as well as a bibliographical curiosity.
