= Jacopo Sannazaro =

Italian poet

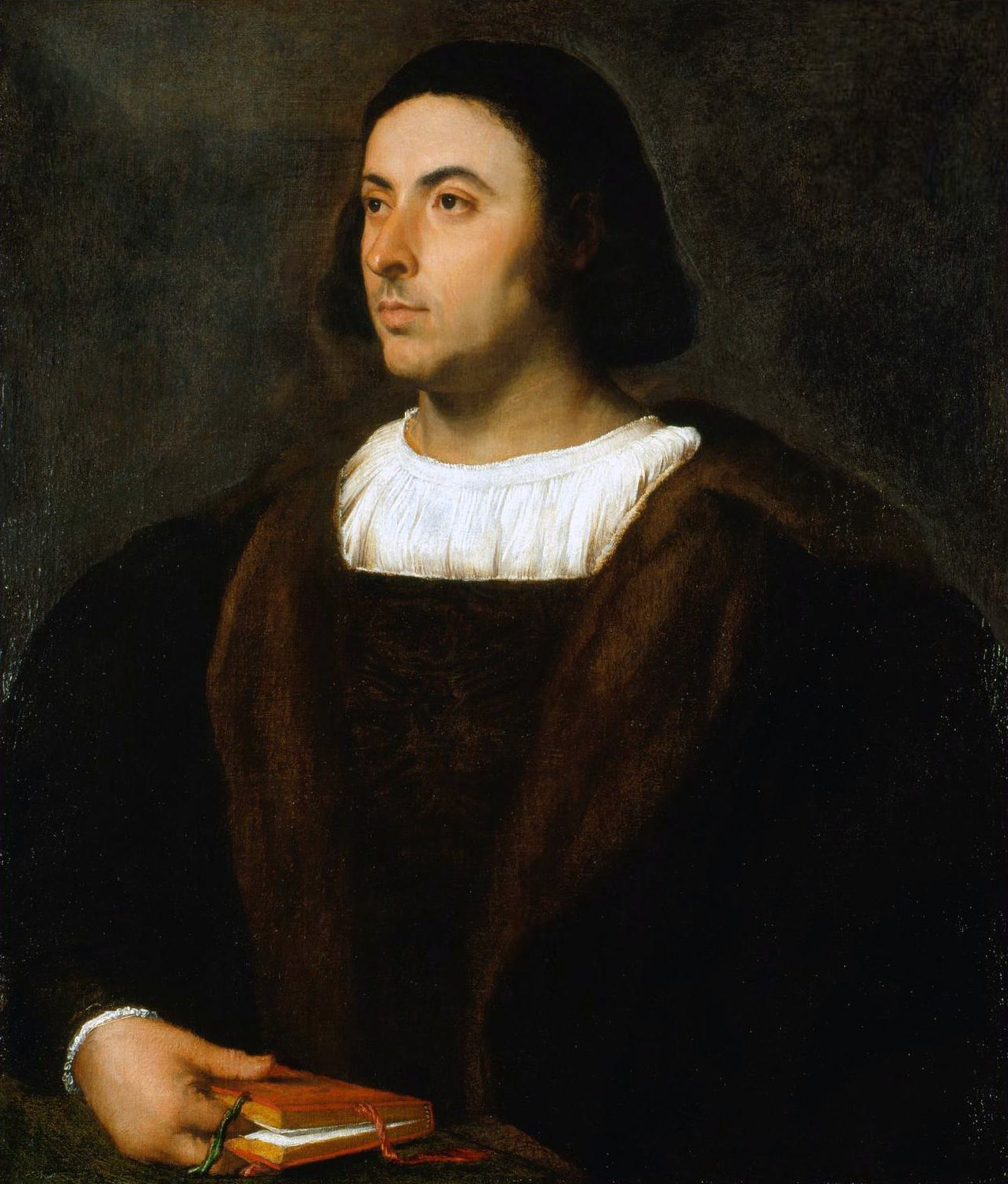
- Titian's Portrait of Jacopo Sannazaro (c. 1514–18) formed part of the diplomatic "Dutch Gift" to Charles II of England in 1660 (Royal Collection).
- Born: 28 July 1458; Naples, Kingdom of Naples
- Died: 6 August 1530 (aged 72); Naples, Kingdom of Naples
- Occupation: Court poet
- Writing career
- Language: Italian; Neapolitan; Latin
- Period: High Renaissance
- Genres: Chivalric romance; epic; eclogue; elegy; sonnet; canzone; epigram; farce
- Subjects: Pastoral; spiritual; love; humor; satire
- Notable works: Arcadia; De partu Virginis
- Movements: Renaissance literature; humanism

Jacopo Sannazaro (Italian pronunciation: [ˈjaːkopo sannadˈdzaːro]; 28 July 1458 – 6 August 1530) was an Italian poet, humanist, member and head of the Accademia Pontaniana from Naples.

He wrote easily in Latin, in Italian and in Neapolitan, but is best remembered for his humanist classic Arcadia, a masterwork that illustrated the possibilities of poetical prose in Italian, and instituted the theme of Arcadia, representing an idyllic land, in European literature. Sannazaro's elegant style was the inspiration for much courtly literature of the 16th century, including Sir Philip Sidney's Arcadia.

== Biography ==
He was born in 1458 at Naples of a noble family of the Lomellina, that claimed to derive its name from a seat in Lombard territory, at San Nazaro near Pavia. His father died ca 1462, during the boyhood of Jacopo, who was brought up at Nocera Inferiore and at San Cipriano Picentino (hosted at the home of Family Sabato, located in Via Santilli) whose rural atmosphere colored his poetry. In 1483–85 he campaigned twice with Alfonso against papal forces near Rome.

In the Accademia Pontaniana that collected around Giovanni Pontano (Jovianus Pontanus), he took the classicizing nom de plume of Actius Syncerus. His withdrawal from Naples as a young man, sometimes treated as biographical, is apparently a purely literary trope. He speedily achieved fame as a poet and a place as a courtier. Following the death of his major patron, Alfonso (1495), in 1499 he received his villa "Mergellina" near Naples from Frederick IV, but when Frederick capitulated to France and Aragon, he followed him into exile in France in 1501, whence he returned to Mergellina after Frederick's death at Tours (1504). The later years of the poet seem to have been spent at Naples. In 1525 he succeeded the humanist Pietro Summonte as head of the Pontanian academy.

== Works ==
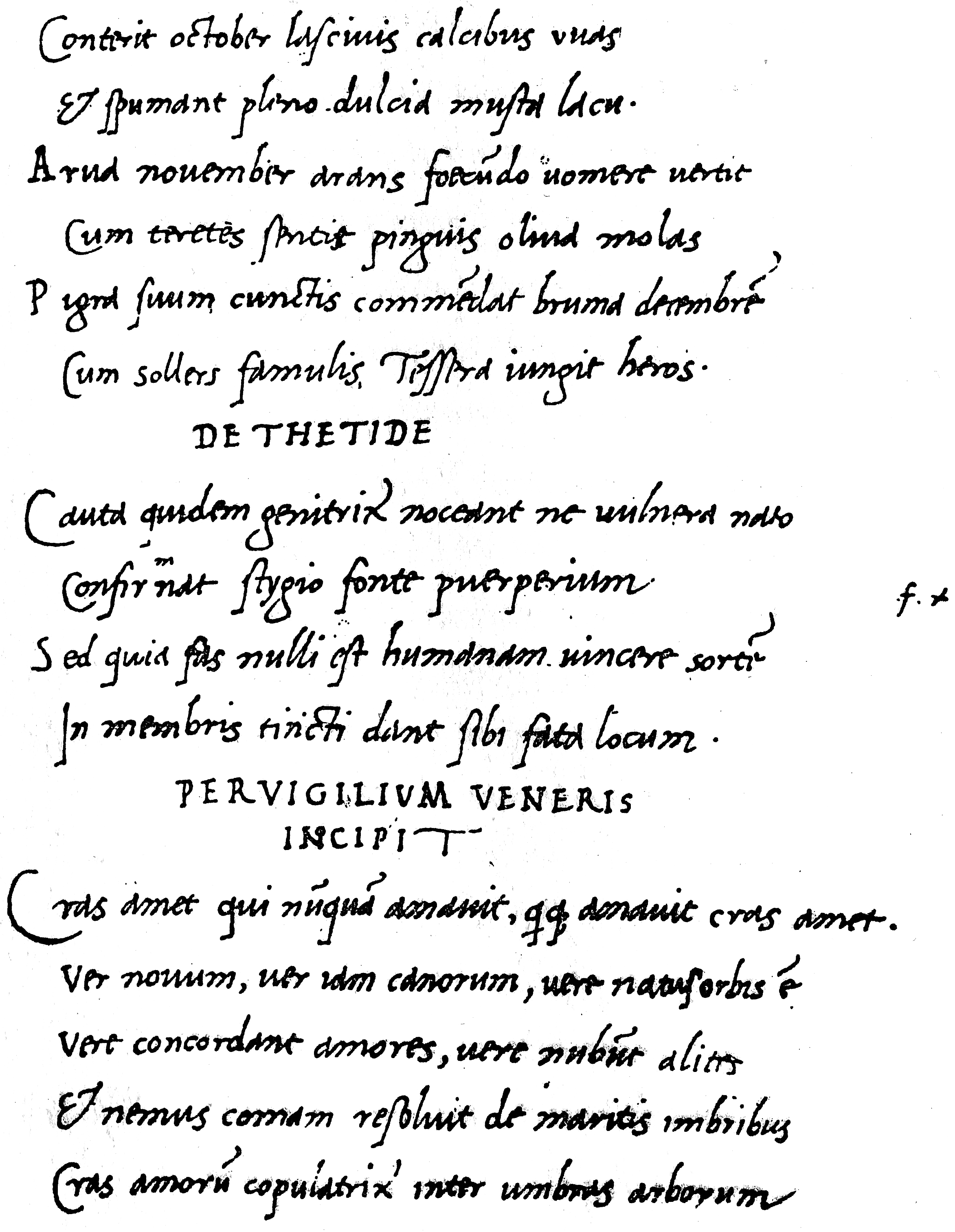
Sannazaro's humanist minuscule hand in a collection of Roman poems he copied in 1501–1503

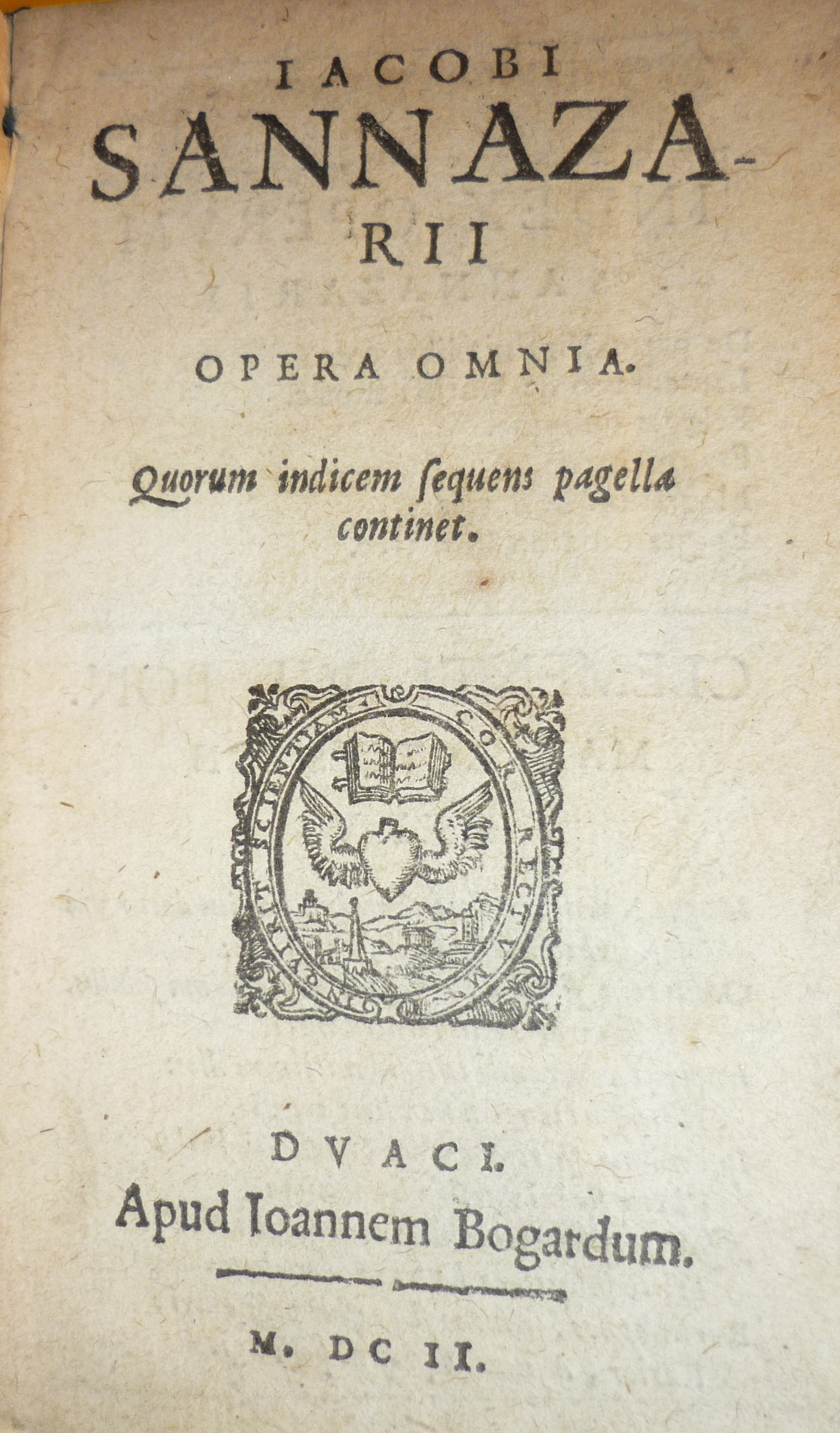
An edition of Sannazaro's collected works, printed in 1602

The Arcadia of Sannazaro was written in the 1480s, completed about 1489 and circulated in manuscript before its initial publication. Begun in early life and published in Naples in 1504, the Arcadia is a pastoral Romance, in which Sincero, the persona of the poet, disappointed in love, withdraws from the city (Naples in this case) to pursue in Arcadia an idealized pastoral existence among the shepherd-poets, in the manner of the Idylls of Theocritus. But a frightful dream induces him to return to the city, traversing a dark tunnel to his native Naples, where he learns of the death of his beloved. The events are amplified by extensive imagery drawn from classic sources, by the poet's languid melancholy and by atmospheric elegiac descriptions of the lost world of Arcadia. It was the first pastoral work in Renaissance Europe to gain international success. Inspired in part by classical authors who wrote in the pastoral mode— in addition to Virgil and Theocritus including comparatively obscure recently rediscovered Latin poets Calpurnius and Nemesianus— and by Boccaccio's Ameto, Sannazaro depicts a lovelorn first-person narrator ("Sincero") wandering the countryside (Arcadia) and listening to the amorous or mournful songs of the shepherds he meets. In addition to its pastoral setting, the other great originality of the work stems from its novel structure of alternating prose and verse.

Sannazaro's Arcadia – coupled with the Portuguese author Jorge de Montemayor's Diana (Los siete libros de la Diana, 1559), itself indebted to Sannazaro's work – had a profound impact on literature throughout Europe up until the middle of the seventeenth century.

With the Arcadia behind him, Sannazaro concentrated on Latin works of classical inspiration. His Virgilian bucolic works include the five Eclogae piscatoriae, eclogues on themes connected with the Bay of Naples, which originated the genre of the piscatorial eclogue; three books of elegies; and three books of epigrams. Other works in Latin include three books of epigrams, and two short works entitled Salices [Willows] and De Morte Christi Lamentatio ["Lament on the Death of Christ"].

Sannazaro's sacred poem in Latin, De partu Virginis, which gained for him the name of the "Christian Virgil", was extensively rewritten in 1519–21 and appeared in print, 1526. It has been characterized as "his version of Mary's Magnificat".

Among his works in Italian and Neapolitan are the recasting of Neapolitan proverbs as Gliommeri his Farse, and the Rime (published as Sonetti et canzoni di M. Jacopo Sannazaro, Naples and Rome, 1530), where the manner of Petrarch is paramount. He also wrote some savage and caustic epigrams. Most famous is the one he wrote against Pope Alexander VI after the murder of Giovanni Borgia, eldest son of the Pope, whose body was recovered from the Tiber River—Sannazaro cheekily described Alexander VI as a "fisher of men" (playing on the Christ's words to Peter). This epigram caused immense grief to the Pope.

His portrait by Titian, painted ca 1514–18, is in the Royal Collection, part of the diplomatic "Dutch Gift" to Charles II, in 1660.

The first complete translation into English of the Arcadia is by Ralph Nash, Jacopo Sannazaro: Arcadia and Piscatorial Eclogues (Detroit: Wayne State University Press) 1966. Nash returned to translate into English prose and verse The Major Latin Poems of Jacopo Sannazaro, (Detroit: Wayne State University Press) 1996. The distinguished Latinist Michael C. J. Putnam has recently published the first translation of all of Sannazaro's Latin poetry.

Sannazaro has also a long-time correspondence with some Italian humanists. The beloved pen-friend was Antonio Seripando, brother of the Augustinian friar Girolamo (1493–1563).

== Tomb ==
"Montfaucon describes the tomb of the poet Sannazaro in the church of the Olivetans, Naples, as ornamented with the statues of Apollo and Minerva, and with groups of satyrs. In the eighteenth century the ecclesiastical authorities tried to give a less profane aspect to the composition, by engraving the name of David under the Apollo, and of Judith under the Minerva".
