= Arcadia (poem) =

1480 pastoral poem by Jacopo Sannazaro

Arcadia is a pastoral poem written around 1480 by Jacopo Sannazaro and published in 1504 in Naples. Sannazaro's Arcadia influenced the literature of the 16th and 17th centuries (e.g., Philip Sidney, William Shakespeare, Marguerite de Navarre, Jorge de Montemayor, Garcilaso de la Vega and John Milton).

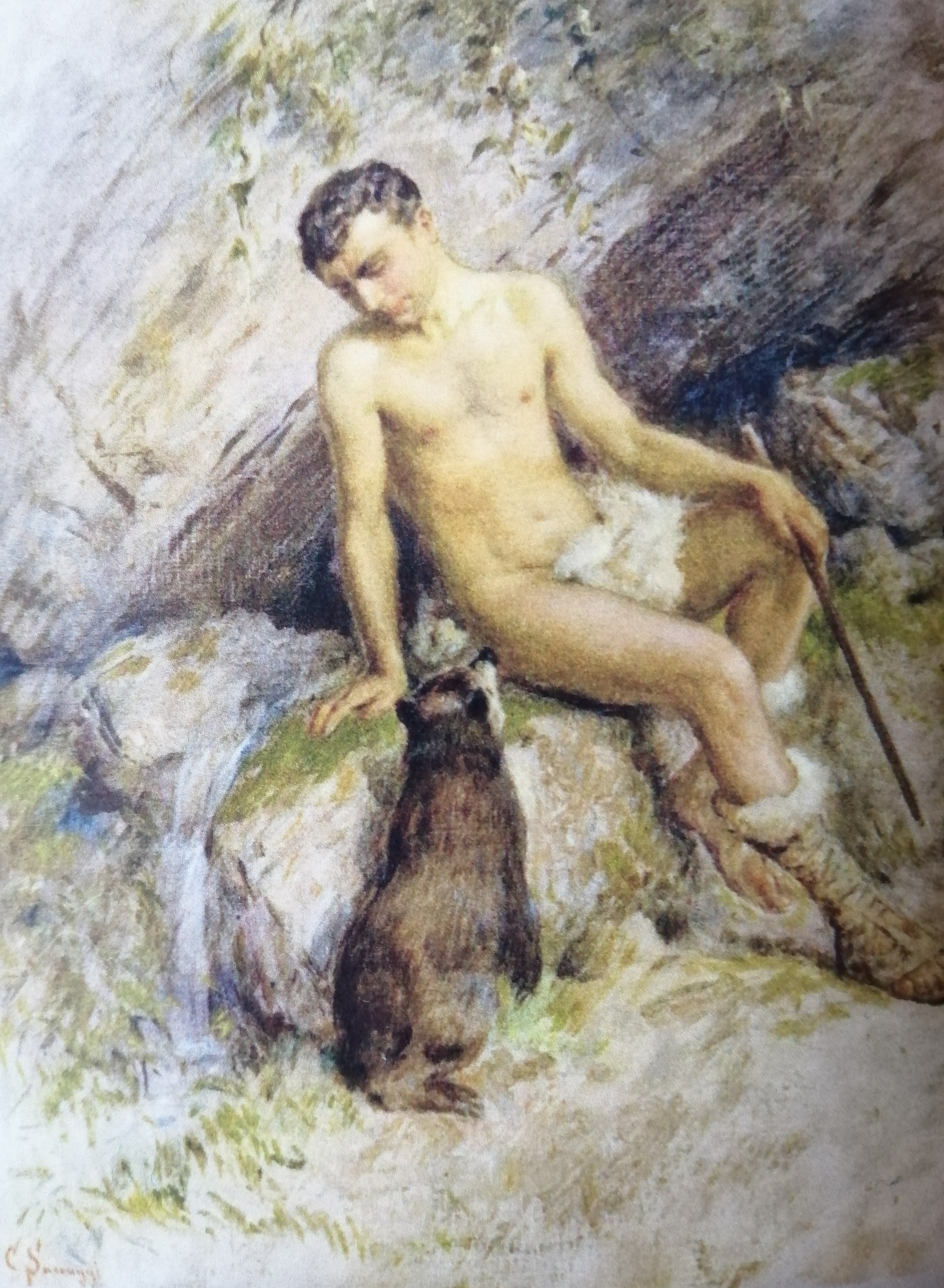
Arcadia Shepherd by Cesare Saccaggi from Tortona

== Form ==
Arcadia by Sannazaro could be considered a prosimetrum – a combination of prose and verse. The alternation of prose and verse is consistent, but each varies considerably. Many portions of the prose are descriptive. Other sections, especially in the second half of the poem, are narrative. Like the prose, the poetry is varied with a number of different poetical forms, including frottola, barzelletta, madrigal, and canzona. Because of the pastoral subject and the sections in prose, Arcadia could also be considered an example of the Pastoral novel genre. Sannazaro can be considered the founder of this literary genre; another well known example is L'Astrée by Honoré d'Urfé.

== Narrative ==
Both the poems (eclogues) and the prose sections of Arcadia constitute a continuous, if episodic, narrative. A young man called Sincero leaves his home in Naples and voyages to Arcadia, a rural area of Greece. There he joins a group of Arcadian shepherds in their work and leisure. They celebrate a spring festival in honor of Pales, the classical goddess of shepherds, and participate in singing contexts. Several young men recount their sad love affairs: one of them is the narrator, who eventually reveals that he is in fact the author, Sannazaro. The group consults a magician who purports to be able to cure lovesickness. The book is tinged with melancholy, deriving from the difficulties of love and the sorrows of death, leading to several poetic pastoral elegies. Near the end of the book, the shepherds mourn the first anniversary of the death of "Massilia"--perhaps based on Sannazaro's own mother—and celebrate her memory with funeral games reminiscent of those in the Iliad and the Aeneid.

In a startling conclusion, Sincero leaves Arcadia and is guided home by a nymph through an undersea passage, viewing the headwaters of all the rivers of the world and the volcanic cores below Mount Vesuvius, as well as the buried city of Pompeii (not to be excavated for another two centuries). He returns home only to find that Naples is also consumed with melancholy: a final eclogue is a moving elegy to the death of the wife of Sannazaro's mentor and colleague, the humanist scholar Giovanni Pontano.

Underlying the melancholy is a deep sense of social fragility, almost certainly referencing the multiple invasions and regime changes in Naples and the other states of the peninsula in the late 15th-century. Arcadia, though Utopian in many ways, is seen as subject to the loss of good government through death and predators.

== Publication history ==
The publication history of Arcadia has two phases. The first follows the tradition of manuscripts consisting of an introduction ("proemio") and ten units in prose and verse. Initially this literary collection was called Aeglogarum liber Arcadium inscriptus then Sannazaro decided to change the name to Libro pastorale nominato (intitulato) Arcadio.

Some years later Sannazaro modified the whole Arcadia again. The title became simply Arcadia and now consisted of a dedication, an introduction, twelve units of prose and verse, and an epilogue (A la Zampogna – To the bagpipes). Three eclogues (I, II and VI) were probably composed before Sannazaro planned to write Arcadia. They were modified and added to the Pastoral novel. The first version of Arcadia with introduction and the ten units of prose and verse was completed towards the end of 1484. A flawed version was published in Venice in 1501 without the approval of the author. The same edition was reprinted by Bernardino da Vercelli in 1502. The second edition was completed by Sannazaro around 1495. This last version was published by Pietro Summonte, who was a humanist and member of the Accademia Pontaniana, in Naples in 1504.

== Style ==
The early fame of Arcadia in Italy was due to its linguistic merits. What made this literary work so original was Sannazaro's decision to write in the Italian language instead of in a regional dialect or in Latin, which was extremely popular in the 15th and 16th centuries. Its style created a completely artificial literary idiom, unspoken by either Florentines or Neapolitans. The language used in Arcadia seems to blend Giovanni Boccaccio's prose and Petrarch's poetry.

== Reception ==
When Arcadia was printed in the 16th century, it became a bestseller. In Italy alone more than 66 editions were printed. Inspired in part by classical authors who described the pastoral world (Virgil, Theocritus, Ovid, Tibullus), and in part by Giovanni Boccaccio's Ameto, Sannazaro wrote a literary work that can be considered the first production of the European Renaissance.

A translation of the Arcadia into contemporary English, with an introduction and commentary, was published by Nicholas R. Jones in 2025; it is only the second translation of the book in English.

== See also ==
- Jacopo Sannazaro
