= Bartholomew Young =

English translator (fl. 1577–1598)

Bartholomew Young or Yong (fl. 1577–1598) was an English translator. He translated Montemayor's Spanish pastoral romance Diana into English.

== The translation ==
Young was, according to a pedigree in the Harleian MS 1754, son of Gregory Young of Yorkshire. He describes himself as of the Middle Temple, and took part as a French orator in a "public shew" given at the Middle Temple, when Lady Rich, probably the sister of Essex, was among the audience. About 1577 he was for two years in Spain. On coming home he spent "welny three yeeres in some serious studies and certaine affaires" without using his Spanish. At this point he fell into the company and acquaintance "of my especial good friend Edward Banister of Idesworth in the Countie of Southampton, Esquier". Banister gave him the first and second parts of Montemayor's Diana to translate into English, that he might not lose his Spanish. He did not publish his translation for sixteen years. In the meantime another translation was completed by Thomas Wilson (1560?–1629). Edward Banister's will is dated 27 March 1600. It leaves property to three friends, of whom Young is one, 'to be bestowed for the benefit of his soul,’ and to each friend four angels for rings. It begins: 'The first leaf of this my will is written by my loving friend Mr. Bartholomew Young, which he wrote for me in my sickness.' Probate is dated 24 Nov. 1606.

== Young's identity ==
Anthony Wood thought that Bartholomew Young was the same who lived at Ashhurst in Kent, and died there in 1621. Joseph Hunter identified him with a Bartholomew Young whose name occurs in the register of burials of St. Dunstan's-in-the-West on 25 September 1612. Since the dedication of Diana to Lady Rich is from High Ongar, Essex, Hunter suggested that he was a relative of Francis Young of Brent Pelham, to whom Anthony Munday in 1602 dedicated Palmerin of England.

== Complete writings ==
Young was the author of:

- The Civile Conversation of M. Stephen Guazzo, written first in Italian, divided into foure bookes, the first three translated out of French by G. Pettie... In the Fourth it is set doune the forme of Civile Conversation, by an Example of a Banquet, made in Cassale, betweene sixe Lords and foure Ladies. And now translated out of Italian into English by Barth. Young, of the Middle Temple, Gent. Imprinted at London by Thomas East, 1586, 4to.
- Amorous Fiammetta. Wherein is sette doune a catalogue of all and singuler passions of Love and jealosie, incident to an enamored yong Gentlewoman, with a notable caveat for all women to eschewe deceitfull and wicked Love, by an apparent example of a Neapolitan Lady her approved and long miseries, and with many sounde dehortations from the same. First wrytten in Italian by Master John Bocace, the learned Florentine, and Poet Laureat. And now done into English by B. Giovano del M. Temp. [B. Young of the Middle Temple]. With notes in the Margine, and with a Table in the ende, of the chiefest matters contayned in it. At London. Printed by I. C. for Thomas Gubbin and Thomas Newman. Anno 1587,’ b.l., 4to. This is dedicated to Sir William Hatton.
- Diana of George of Montemayor, translated out of Spanish into English by Bartholomew Yong of the Middle Temple, Gentleman. At London, Printed by Edm. Bollifant, impensis G. B.,’ 1598, fol. The dedication to Lady Rich, dated 'from High Onger in Essex the 28 of Novemb. 1598,’ is followed by 'The Preface to divers learned Gentlemen, and other my loving friendes;’

These contain some biographical details regarding the author. He praises the translation made in manuscript by Edward Paston of the Diana as better than his own, but, unfortunately, not complete. Young translates the first part of Diana by "George of Montemayor"; the second part by Alonzo Perez; and the third part, more properly called the first part of the Enamoured Diana, by Gaspar Gil Polo. There are many lyrics dispersed through these works which are translated by Young into English verse. Twenty-five of these lyrics are given in Englands Helicon, 1600. Shakespeare used the Story of the Shepherdess Felismena in writing the Two Gentlemen of Verona. It has been reprinted by Hazlitt in 'Shakspere's Library' (I. i. 275–312; for proof that Shakespeare used the Diana either in Young's manuscript or some other form, see especially p. 55 of Young's printed translation).

== Modern editions ==
- The Civile Conversation of M. Steven Guazzo, the first three books translated by George Pettie, anno 1581, and the fourth by Barth. Young, anno 1586; with an introduction by Sir Edward Sullivan, bart., Constable and Co., Ltd.; A.A. Knopf, 1925.
