= Diana (pastoral romance) =

1559 pastoral romance by Jorge de Montemayor

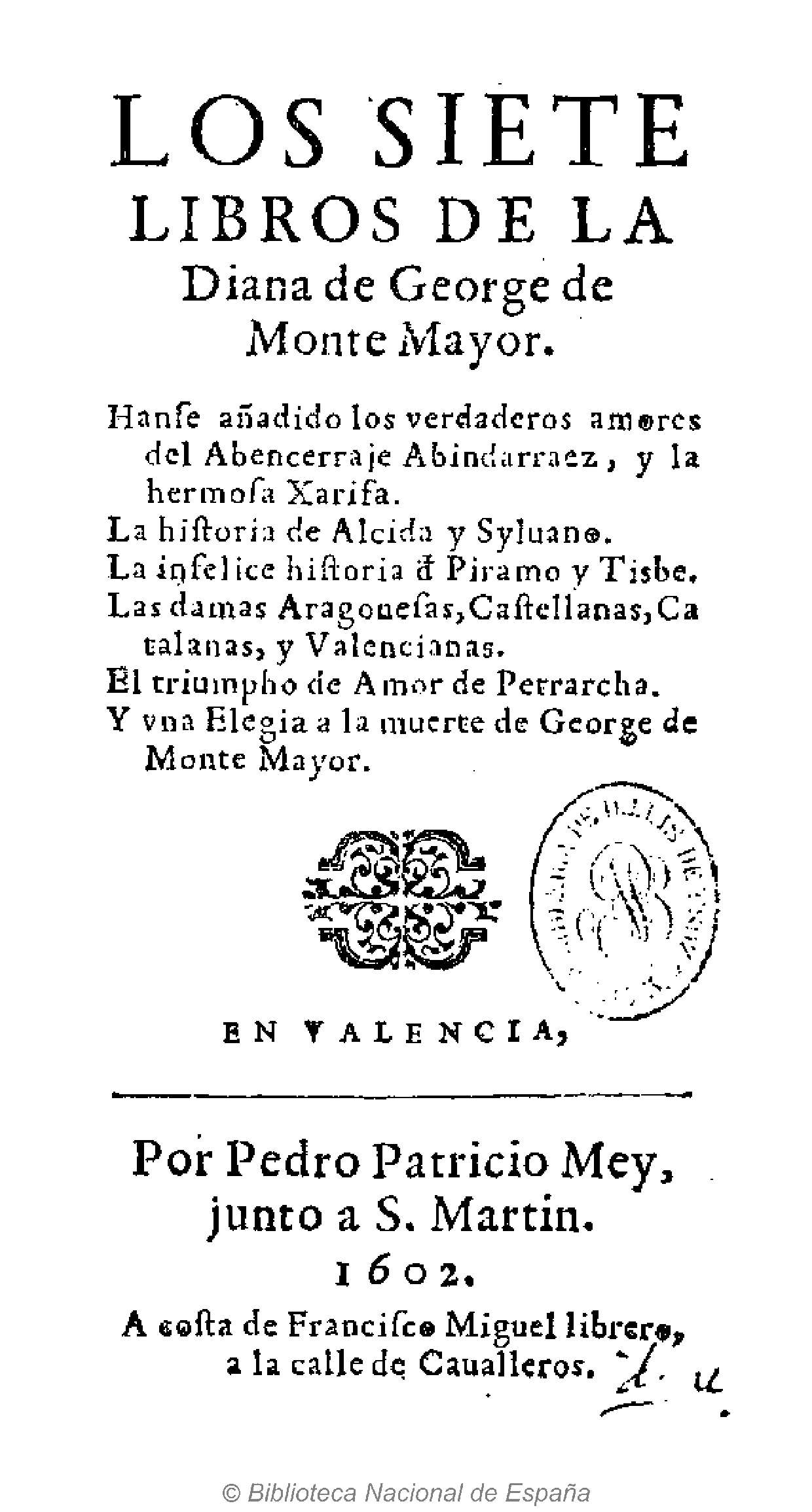
Title page of the 1602 edition

The Seven Books of the Diana (Spanish: Los siete libros de la Diana) is a pastoral romance written in Spanish by the Portuguese author Jorge de Montemayor. The romance was first published in 1559, though later editions expanded upon the original text. A sixteenth-century bestseller, the Diana helped launch a vogue for stories about shepherds, shepherdesses, and their experiences in love. One of its most famous readers was William Shakespeare, who seems to have borrowed the Proteus–Julia–Sylvia plot of The Two Gentlemen of Verona from Felismena's tale in the Diana.

== Plot ==
The Diana begins with a summary of previous events, telling us that the shepherd Sireno is in love with the shepherdess Diana. She once returned his love, but when Sireno was called away from their village, she was married to another shepherd named Delio. The story begins with Sireno's return after a year's absence, having already learned of Diana's marriage.

Over the course of the first three books, Sireno encounters other shepherds and shepherdesses who sing songs and tell stories of their own experiences with frustrated love. Among these is a warrior maiden named Felismena (not truly a shepherd, but dressed as one for the time being), who rescues Sireno and his friends from an attack by wild men. The group of shepherds is persuaded to seek out the enchantress Felicia, who may have the power to solve their romantic dilemmas. In the fourth book they are welcomed by Felicia at her castle, and proceed to tour the wonders within (including the halls of Venus and Mars, and a performance by the legendary Orpheus). After they have rested, Felicia administers her magic potion, causing some of the shepherds to either forget or reroute their old desires. Sireno is cured of his love for Diana. In the final three books the initial love stories are resolved, with the shepherds either finding new love partners or recovering ones they believed they had lost. Felismena finds her lover, Don Felis (or "Felix" in the English translation), and rescues him from an attack by enemy knights. With a little help from Felicia's magic, Felis remembers his love for Felismena and the two are married. The Sireno–Diana situation, however, remains unresolved. Sireno can now greet Diana with calm indifference, but Diana is clearly pained by his transformation and laments her forced marriage to another man. The book ends by promising a sequel, though Montemayor never lived to complete one.

== Expansions and sequels ==
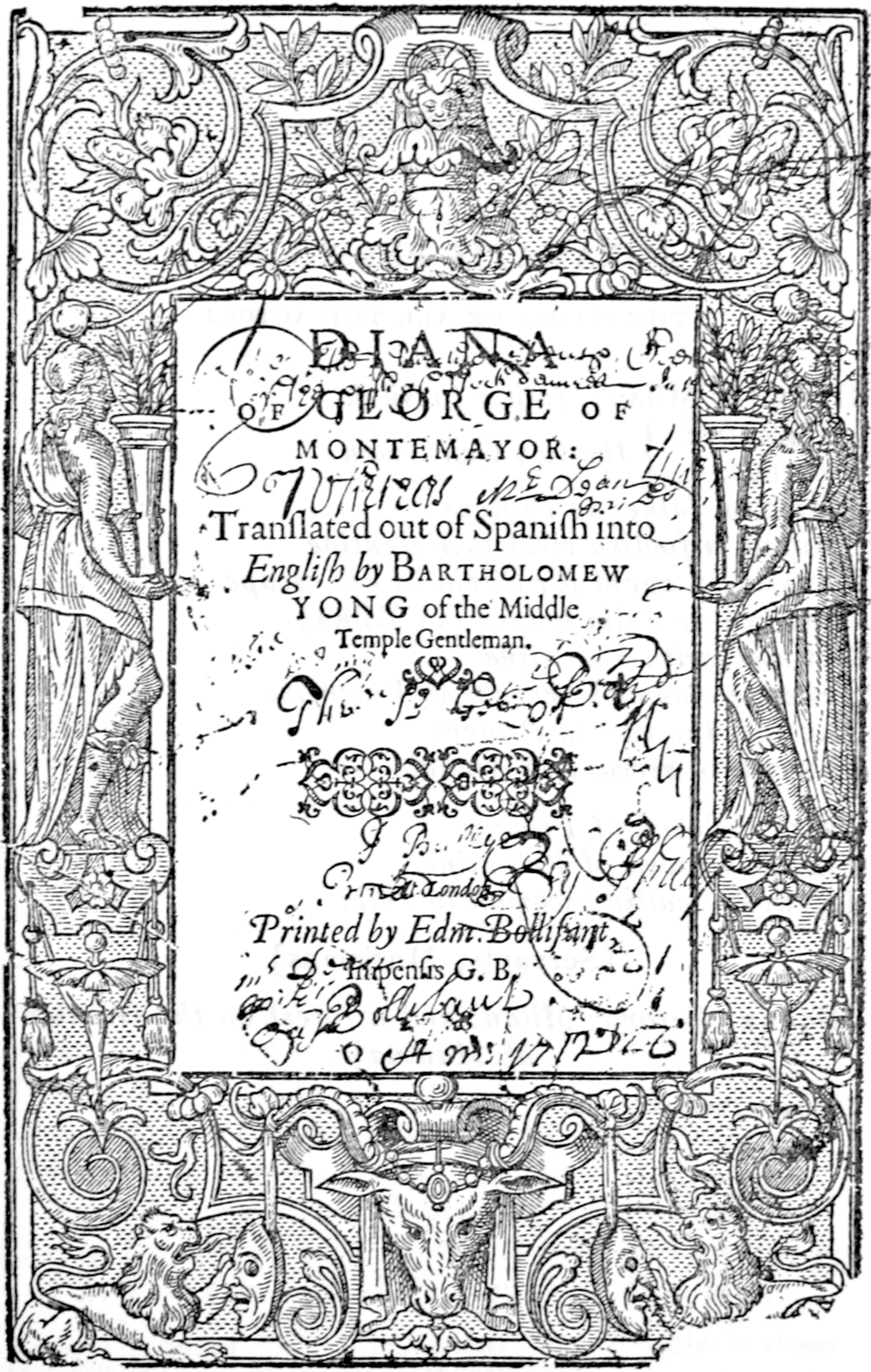
Title page of the 1598 English translation

The 1561 edition of Valladolid introduced certain changes into the text which were often reproduced in later editions and translations. The most significant of these changes is the insertion of a new interpolated tale, the "Abencerraje", told to entertain the shepherds in Felismena's palace at the end of book 4. Scholars now believe the new material to be Montemayor's own work, though the decision to add them to his pastoral romance may have been made by an enterprising publisher.

Montemayor's text prompted two separate sequels in Spanish, both published in 1564: Alonso Pérez's La Segunda Parte de la Diana (The Second Part of the Diana), and Gaspar Gil Polo's Diana Enamorada (Enamoured Diana). Bartholomew Yong's English translation of the Diana (completed ca. 1582 and published in 1598) included both sequels alongside Montemayor's original.

== Circulation and influence in the Renaissance ==
While inspired by Jacobo Sannazaro's Arcadia, Montemayor's Diana is arguably the first major work of pastoral prose fiction in the Renaissance, placing just as much emphasis on its ongoing plot and interwoven stories as on the poems sung by its shepherd protagonists. The Diana is significant for being one of the most popular works of early modern fiction not merely in Spain, but abroad as well. By Julián Arribas' count, there were at least thirty-one Spanish editions of the text printed in the sixteenth century alone. That same period also witnessed twelve French translated editions, and one English translation by Bartholomew Yong.

Felismena's back-story in the Diana, wherein Felismena cross-dresses as a page in order to pursue her faithless lover, was probably Shakespeare's source for his Two Gentlemen of Verona. Montemayor's ending differs from Shakespeare's play, however, since Montemayor's heroine saves her lover's life; the rekindling of their love is also helped along by Felicia's magic. Speaking more broadly, Geoffrey Bullough, Judith Kennedy, and Stuart Gillespie have all noted that Montemayor's pastoral romance seems to have been foundational for the development of Shakespeare's comedies: they point particularly to Montemayor's influential exploration of love, his emphasis on strong female heroines and their perspectives, and his treatment of amorous intrigue and entanglements.

Montemayor's Diana was also a major inspiration for Philip Sidney in writing the New Arcadia. Montemayor's influence was noticed early on by Sidney's contemporaries: as John Hoskins stated in 1599, "For the web, as it were, of [Sidney's] story, he followed three: Heliodorus in Greek, Sannazarius' Arcadia in Italian, and Diana by Montemayor in Spanish." Sidney in particular seems to have modeled his opening scene between the shepherds Strephon and Klaius on Montemayor's Sireno and Sylvano.

Miguel de Cervantes mentions the Diana with both approval and criticism in the book-burning episode of his Don Quixote (part I, chapter 6), where Quixote's friend the priest declares the book too good to be thrown in the fire like the rest:

And opening one, [the priest] saw that it was Diana, by Jorge de Montemayor, and he said, believing that all the others were of the same genre:
"These do not deserve to be burned like the rest, because they do not and will not cause the harm that books of chivalry have, for they are books of the understanding and do no injury to anyone. [...] To begin with Montemayor's Diana, I am of the opinion that it should not be burned, but that everything having to do with the wise Felicia and the enchanted water, and almost all the long verses, should be excised, and let it happily keep all the prose and the honor of being the first of such books."

== Translations ==
Diana has been translated into English twice. First by Bartholomew Yong in 1598, (republished in 1968) and more recently by RoseAnna M. Mueller in 1989.
