= George Pettie =

English writer

George Pettie (1548–1589) was an English writer of romances. His style influenced Robert Greene, and paved the way to euphuism.

== Life ==
He was younger son of John Le Petite or Pettie of Tetsworth and Stoke Talmage, Oxfordshire, by his wife Mary, daughter of William Charnell of Snareston, Leicestershire. He became a scholar of Christ Church, Oxford, in 1564, and graduated B.A. on 29 March 1569. According to Anthony Wood, William Gager of Christ Church was a close friend. At Christ Church, Pettie was servitor to Thomas Bernard, with Richard Verstegan.

Pettie travelled abroad, and apparently had some military experience. On returning home he concentrated on writing and translating. He died, according to Wood, during July 1589, in his prime, at Plymouth. He was buried in "the great Church" at Plymouth.

== Works ==
The success of The Palace of Pleasure (1566–7) of William Painter prompted Pettie to write a similar book: A Petite Pallace of Pettie his Pleasure, contayning many pretie Hystories by him, set foorth in comely Colours, and most delightfully discoursed.’ It was licensed for the press to Richard Watkins on 6 August 1576, and was published soon afterwards, without date. Pettie, in his preface, says he mainly wrote for gentlewomen, and deprecated all comparison with the Palace of Pleasure. The work contains the line "So long as I know it not, it hurteth mee not." which is cited in the Oxford Dictionary of Proverbs as being the oldest written record of the similar phrase: "what you don't know can't hurt you".

The author apologised for modernising classical tales. The stories are twelve in number. The book was popular, and two other editions, set up from new type, appeared in the same year. Other editions appeared in 1580 and 1598 by James Roberts, and in 1608 and 1613 by George Eld.

Pettie also translated the first three books of Stefano Guazzo's Civile Conversation, via French. Richard Watkins obtained a licence for the publication on 27 February 1581. The first edition appeared in that year with a dedication addressed from Pettie's lodging near St Paul's Cathedral, London, on 6 February 1581, to Marjorie, wife of Henry Norris, 1st Baron Norreys. The work is in prose, with a few verses interspersed. A second issue by Thomas East was dated 1586, and included a fourth book of Guazzo, begun by Pettie, but completed from the Italian by Bartholomew Young.

== Family ==
Pettie left lands at Aston Rowant, Kingston Blount, and Tetsworth, handed down from his father, to his brother Christopher. Another brother, Robert, was father of Mary Pettie, the mother of Anthony Wood.

== Notes ==
Attribution

This article incorporates text from a publication now in the public domain: Lee, Sidney, ed. (1896). "Pettie, George". Dictionary of National Biography. Vol. 45. London: Smith, Elder & Co.
