= Portrait of Jacopo Sannazaro =

Painting by Titian

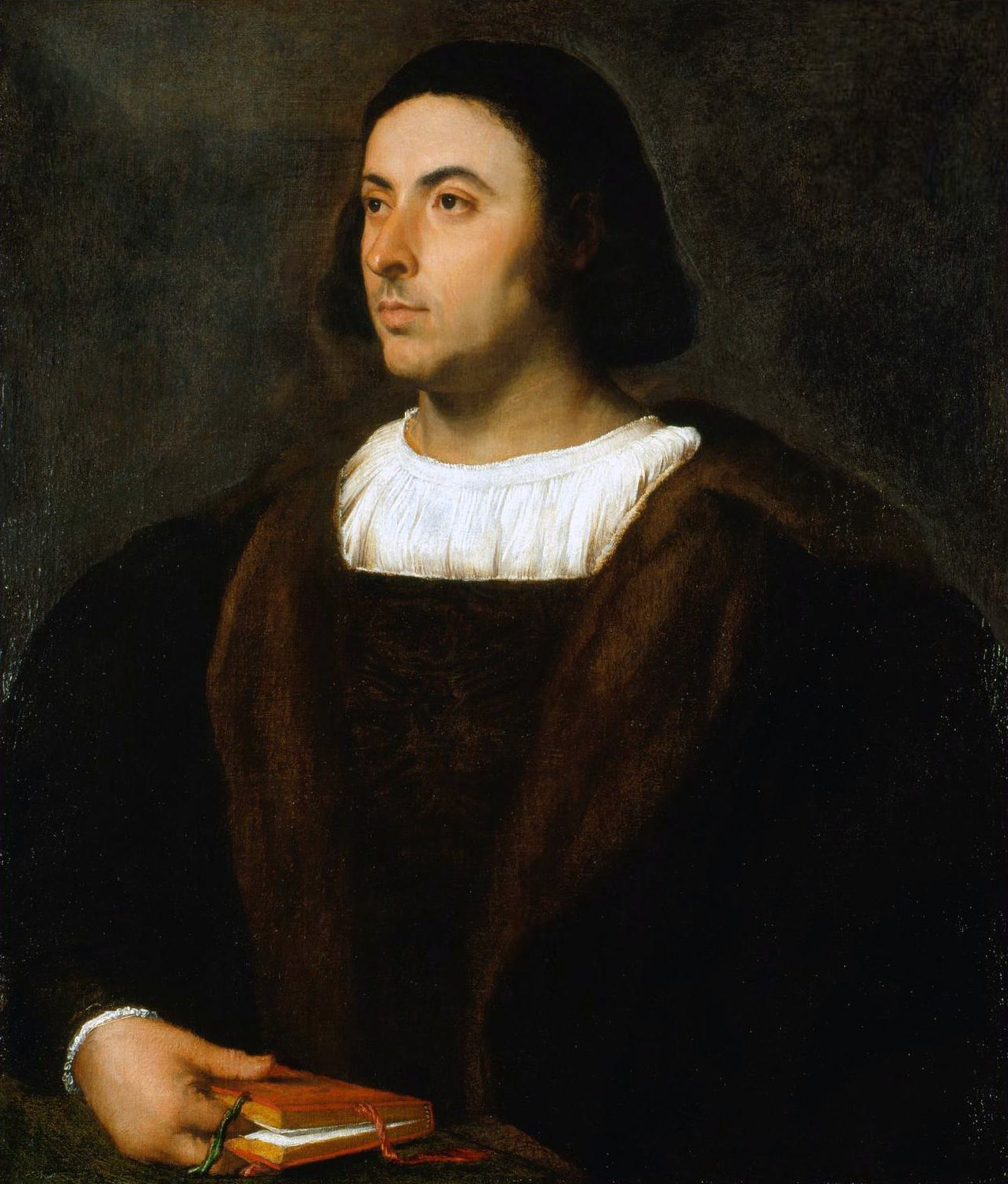
- Artist: Titian
- Year: c. 1513–1518
- Medium: Oil on canvas
- Dimensions: 85.7 cm × 72.7 cm (33.7 in × 28.6 in)
- Location: Buckingham Palace; London
- Accession: RCIN 407190

Portrait of Jacopo Sannazaro, also known as Portrait of a Man, is an oil painting by the Venetian master Titian, dated to about 1513. It is part of the Royal Collection, and hangs in Buckingham Palace.

== Subject ==
Both the names formerly given to this picture, Boccaccio and Alessandro de' Medici, are incorrect. The sitter is now thought to be Jacopo Sannazaro, a poet and humanist from Naples. This identification was first proposed by Georg Gronau in 1895, and is supported by an early copy of the painting (Walker Art Gallery, Liverpool) inscribed Sincerus Sannzarius ("Actius Sincerus" was a known alias of Sannazaro).

== History ==
The portrait has been dated variously from c. 1511 to the early 1520s. The style of the sitter's clothing and hair suggest a date closer to 1513; certainly before 1520. According to Gronau, "It has in style its companion in the Parma at Vienna, and must have been painted about 1511. It shows the period of transition from the purely Giorgionesque style to Titian's quite personal one."

== Analysis ==
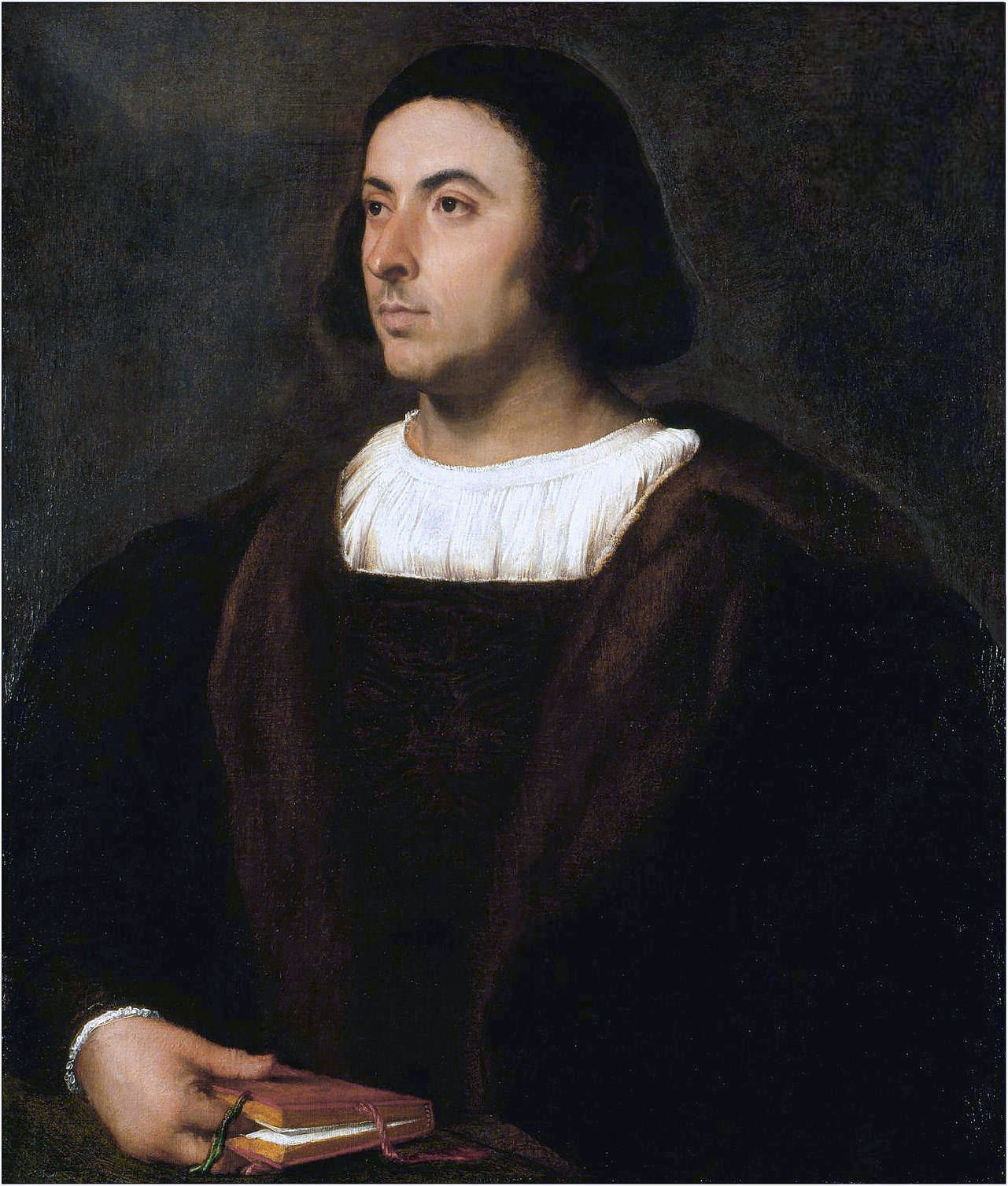
Portrait of Jacopo Sannazaro (retouched colours)

Georg Gronau notes how a comparison of the few single portraits belonging to Titian's earlier years leads us to observe that in them the hands are made use of as an essential characteristic of the personality. Here the sitter lets his only hand visible rest on a book lying on the parapet in front, while his eyes wander away into space. This makes us suppose him a literary man.

Charles Ricketts, writing in 1910, appraises the work highly:

The 'Alessandro' has few rivals among Titian's finest portraits. Dirt and old varnish have now been removed, and saving the large patch upon the brow, it is in good condition; few works better illustrate that magisterial quality which Reynolds praises in Titian's portraits. In the combination of dignity and simplicity, it ranks with the 'Parma' at Vienna, the 'Man in Black' (Louvre), and with 'L'Homme au Gant,' among his finest works.

== Provenance ==
This portrait is well known from Van Dalen's engraving. It is said to have belonged to the collection of Charles I; later in the Cabinet Van Reynst, which, after the death of its owner, was acquired by the States of Holland and West Friesland and presented to Charles II in 1660.

== Copies ==
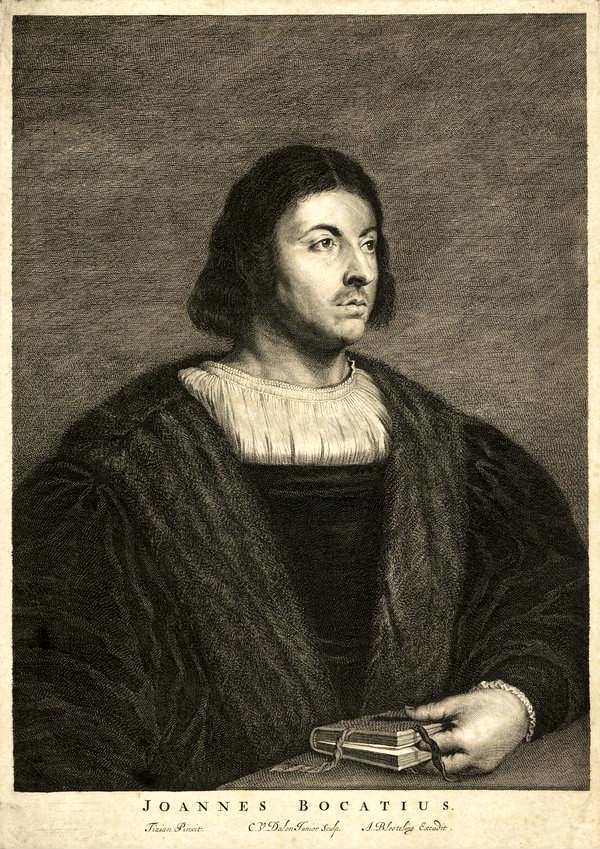
Joannes Bocatius. Line engraving on paper by Cornelis van Dalen II after Titian (Date unknown)

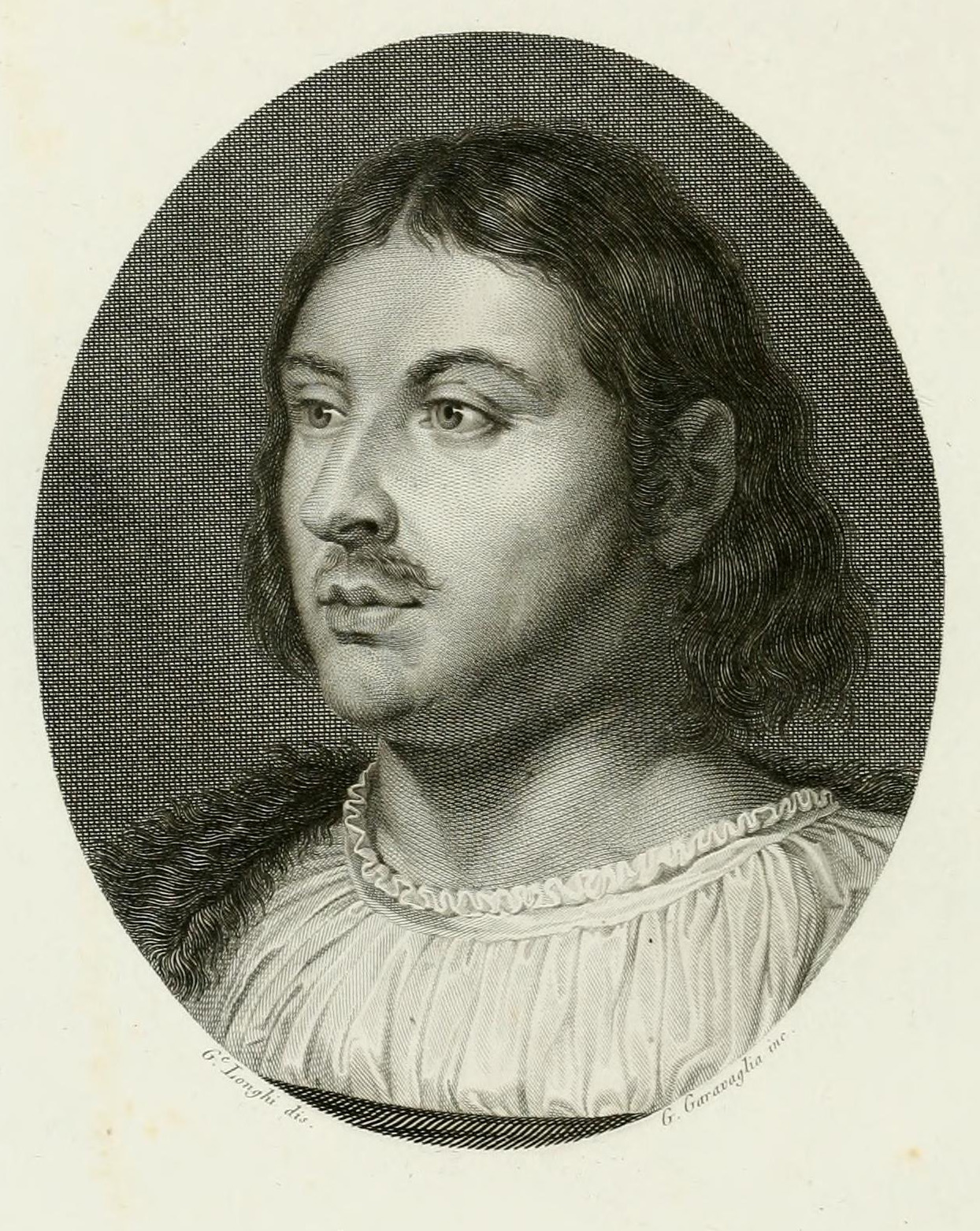
Giovanni Boccaccio. Burin engraving by G. Garavaglia based on a design by G^{e}. Longhi (1812)

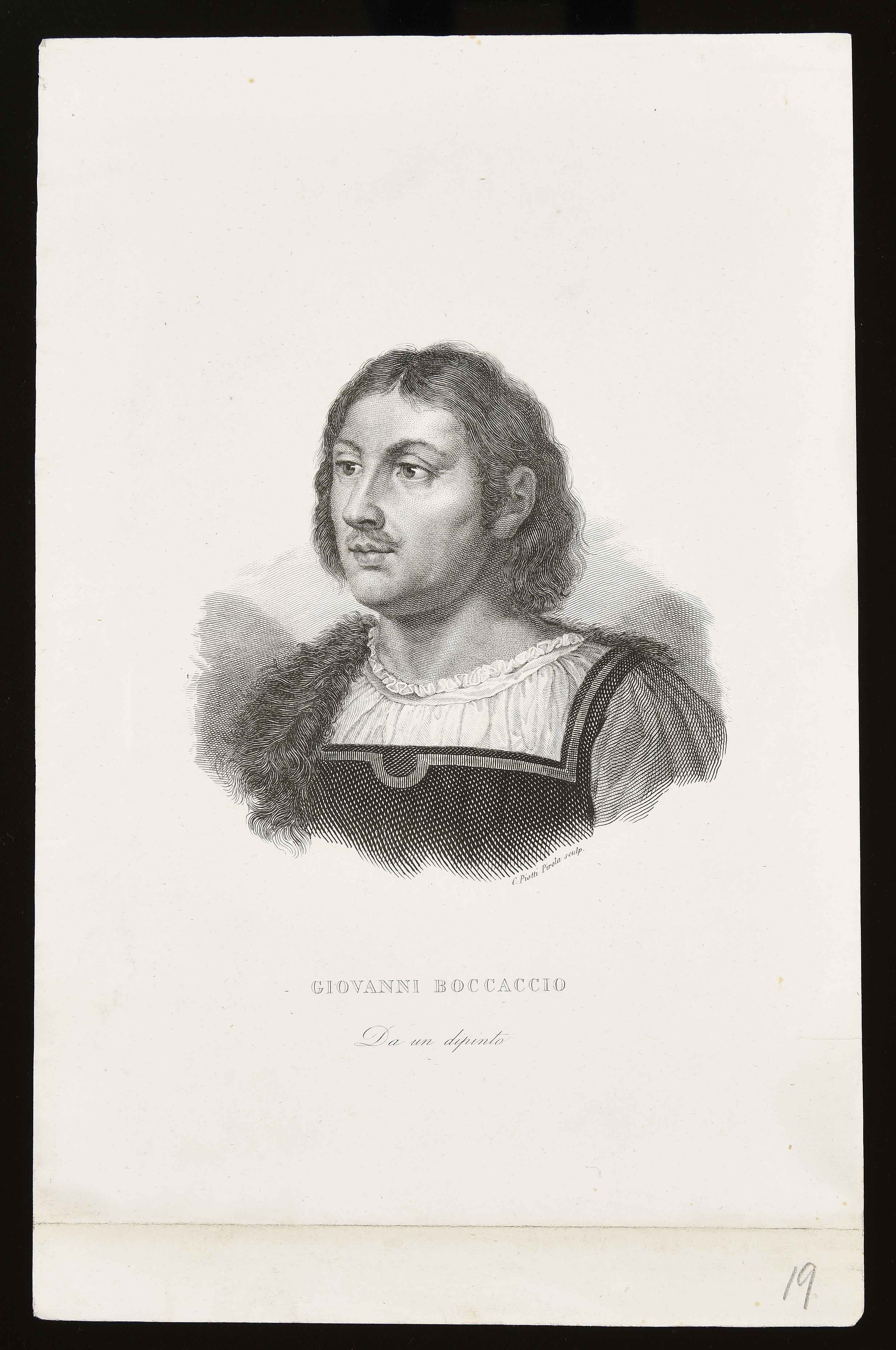
Giovanni Boccaccio / Da un dipinto. Copper engraving by
C. Piotti Pirola (1837)

== See also ==
- List of works by Titian
- Dutch Gift

== Sources ==
- Whitaker, Lucy; Clayton, Martin (2007). The Art of Italy in the Royal Collection: Renaissance & Baroque. St James's Palace, London: Royal Collection Enterprises Ltd. pp. 31, 32, 188, 189.
- "Portrait of Jacopo Sannazaro (1458-1530) c. 1514-18". Royal Collection Trust. Accessed 21 August 2022.

Attribution:
