= Pietro Summonte =

Italian humanist

Pietro Summonte (1463–1526) was an Italian Renaissance humanist of Naples, a member of the learned circle of friends in the Ciceronian manner that constituted Pontano's Accademia Pontaniana. Summonte's care in preserving his correspondence on artistic matters with the Venetian Marcantonio Michiel resulted in a precious archive mined by art historians. His major poem was the Canzone intitulata Aragonia. To him, Jacopo Sannazaro and Benedetto Cariteo addressed verses in Latin and the vernacular, and Sannazaro entrusted his Arcadia, which had circulated in manuscript since about 1485, but of which corrupt pirated editions appeared at Venice (1502) for a carefully corrected printing by Sigismondo Mayr (1504), in which Brian Richardson has detected revisions that brought the language closer to Boccaccio and Petrarch, so that it lost many of its southern dialect forms. Summonte, who took on the guidance of the Accademia Pontaniana after Pontano's death (1503), edited for publication Pontano's two books of Hendecasyllables, to which he applied the subtitle Baiae.
