= Barzelletta =

Verse form used by Italian frottola composers

Barzelletta (lit. "jest") was a popular verse form used by frottola composers in Italy in the fifteenth and sixteenth centuries. It is generally trochaic, with eight syllables per line. The barzelletta consists of two sections: a reprisa which is four rhyming lines (rhyme scheme ABBA or ABAB), a stanza, and a volta. The barzelletta tends to be lively and dance-like, with heavy accents on cadences.
