= The Two Gentlemen of Verona =

Play by William Shakespeare

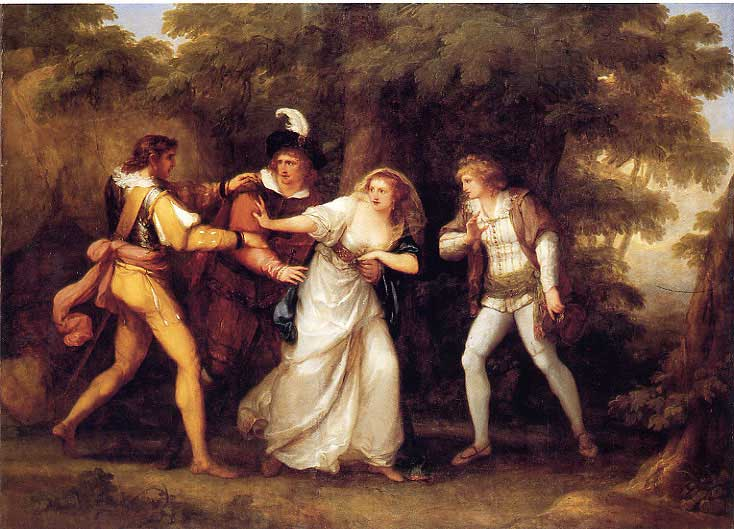
Two Gentlemen of Verona by Angelica Kauffman (1789)

The Two Gentlemen of Verona is a comedy by William Shakespeare, believed to have been written between 1589 and 1593. It is considered by some to be Shakespeare's first play, (Note: It is placed first in both The Oxford Shakespeare: The Complete Works (1986 and 2005), The Norton Shakespeare (1997 and 2008) and The Complete Pelican Shakespeare (2002); see also Leech (1969: xxx), Wells and Taylor (1997: 109), Carroll (2004: 130) and Warren (2008: 26–27)) and is often seen as showing his first tentative steps in laying out some of the themes and motifs with which he would later deal in more detail; for example, it is the first of his plays in which a heroine dresses as a boy. The play deals with the themes of friendship and infidelity, the conflict between friendship and love, and the foolish behaviour of people in love. The highlight of the play is considered by some to be Launce, the clownish servant of Proteus, and his dog Crab, to whom "the most scene-stealing non-speaking role in the canon" has been attributed.

Two Gentlemen is often regarded as one of Shakespeare's weakest plays. It has the smallest named cast of any play by Shakespeare.

== Characters ==
Verona:

- Valentine – a gentleman
- Proteus – Valentine's best friend
- Julia – Proteus' betrothed
- Launce – Proteus' servant
- Speed – Valentine's servant
- Antonio – Proteus' father
- Panthino – Antonio's servant
- Lucetta – Julia's servant
- Crab – Launce's dog

Milan:

- The Duke – Silvia's father
- Silvia – Valentine's beloved
- Thurio – a foolish suitor to Silvia
- Sir Eglamour – a knight who aids Silvia

The Forest:

- The Host – an innkeeper who helps Julia
- The Outlaws – banished men originally from Milan

== Summary ==
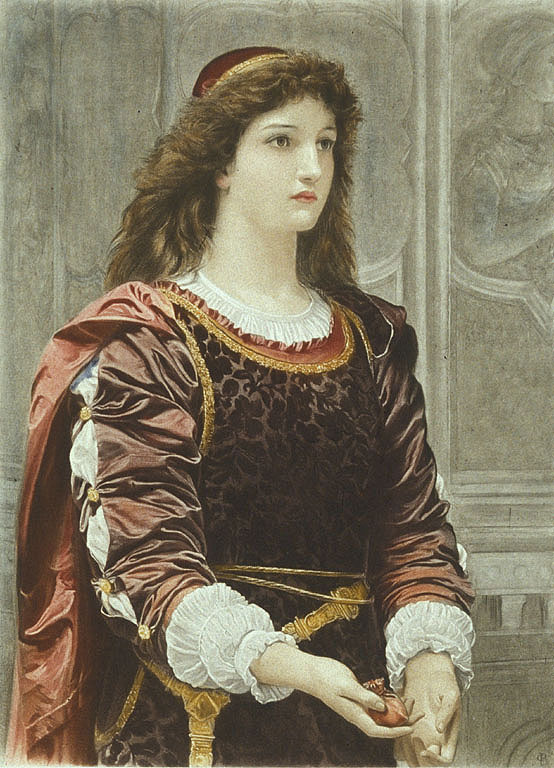
Silvia by Charles Edward Perugini (1888)

Valentine, a gentleman of Verona, is preparing to leave for Milan, accompanied by his servant, Speed, in order to expand his horizons at the Duke of Milan's court. He hopes that his best friend, Proteus, will come, but Proteus is unwilling to leave his love, Julia. Disappointed, Valentine departs alone.

Proteus's father, however, has been persuaded that Proteus too needs to further his gentlemanly education, and he orders his son to leave for Milan the very next day, prompting a tearful farewell with Julia, to whom Proteus swears eternal love. The couple exchange rings and vows. Proteus sets off accompanied by his own servant, Launce, and Launce's dog, Crab.

In Milan, Valentine has fallen in love with the Duke's daughter, Silvia, who clearly prefers this suitor to the wealthy but foppish Thurio whom her father wants her to marry. As soon as Proteus arrives, he too falls in love with Silvia. Determined to win her, and agonising only briefly about betraying both his friend and his lover, Proteus slyly tells the Duke that Valentine plans to elope with Silvia, using a corded ladder to rescue her from the tower room in which she is imprisoned each night. The Duke banishes Valentine. Wandering in the forest, Valentine runs into a band of outlaws. When Valentine claims he was exiled for killing a man in a duel, the outlaws believe him and elect him their leader.

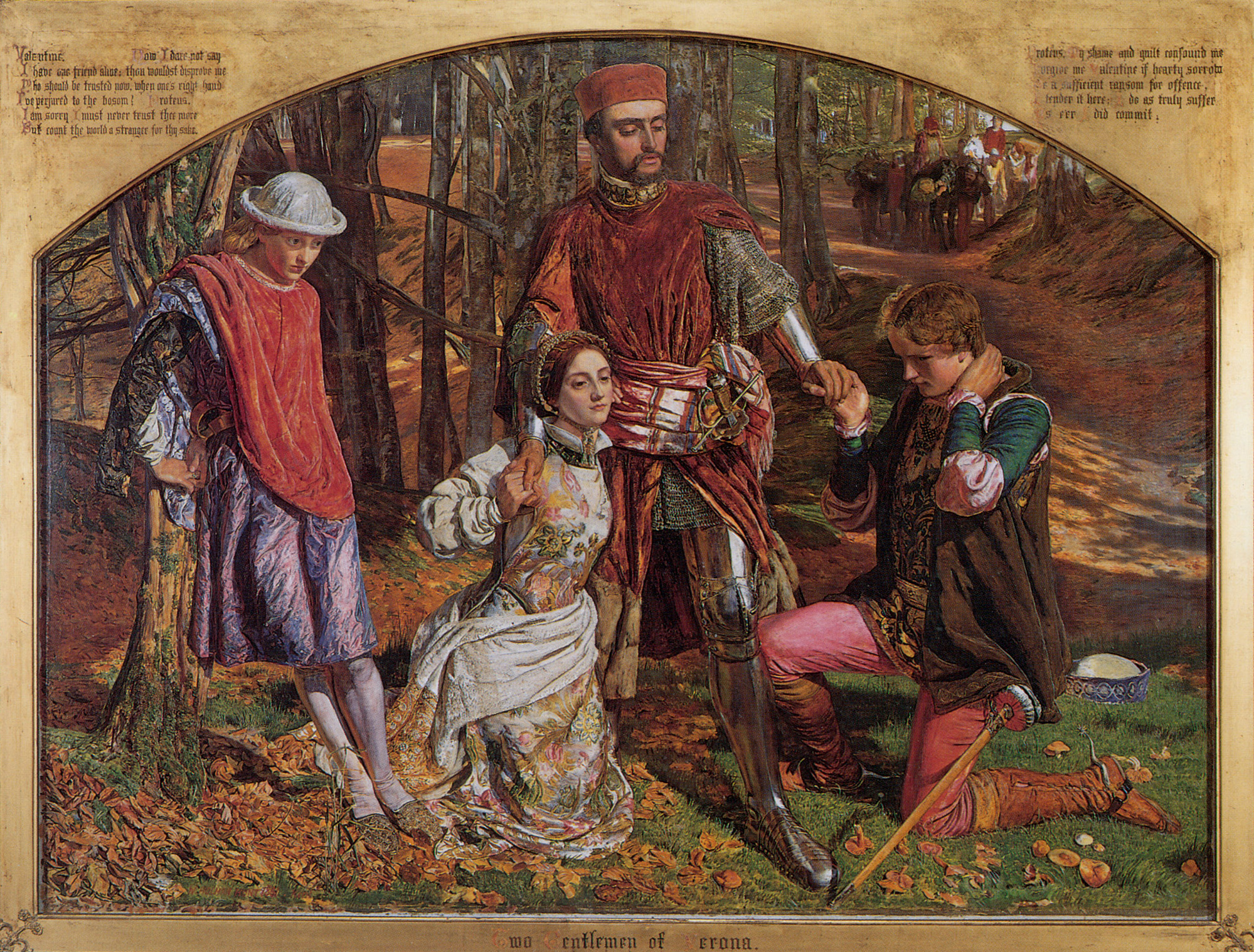
Valentine Rescuing Sylvia from Proteus by William Holman Hunt (1851)

Back in Verona, Julia decides to join her lover in Milan and convinces her maid Lucetta to dress her in boy's clothes. On arrival in Milan, Julia discovers Proteus's love for Silvia and watches him serenade her. To learn more, she contrives to become his page boy, calling herself Sebastian. Proteus sends Julia/Sebastian to Silvia with a gift of a ring that Julia had given him before he left Verona. Silvia scorns Proteus's affections, repelled by his inconstancy to the lover he has left behind.

In despair, Silvia flees into the forest, where she is quickly taken prisoner by the outlaws. They head to their new leader, Valentine, on the way encountering Proteus and Julia/Sebastian. Proteus rescues Silvia but, secretly observed by Valentine, continues to press his unwanted suit. When Proteus tells Silvia that he intends to force himself on her, Valentine intervenes.

Proteus professes to be horrified by his own behaviour. Convinced that Proteus's repentance is genuine, Valentine forgives him and says "All that was mine in Silvia I give thee". At this point, overwhelmed, Julia swoons, revealing her true identity. Proteus suddenly recalls his love for her and vows fidelity once again.

The Duke and Thurio are brought in by the outlaws. Thurio claims Silvia as his, but Valentine warns that if he makes a move toward her, he will kill him. Terrified, Thurio renounces his claim. The Duke, disgusted by Thurio's cowardice and impressed by Valentine's actions, approves Valentine's and Silvia's love and consents to their marriage. The two couples, Valentine and Silvia, and Proteus and Julia, are happily united. The Duke pardons the outlaws and permits their return to Milan.

== Sources ==
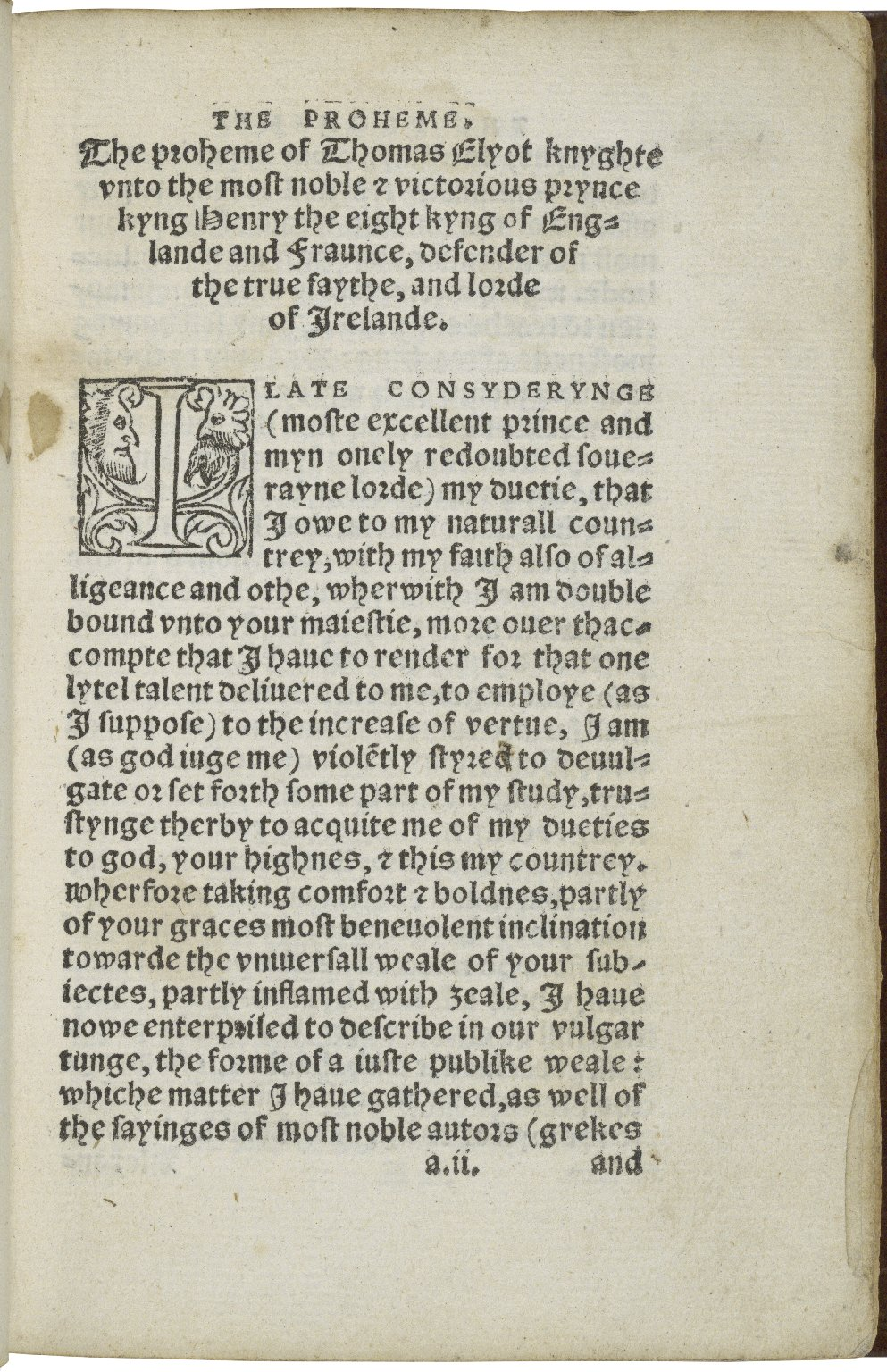
First page of The Boke Named the Governour by Thomas Elyot (1531)

In writing The Two Gentlemen of Verona, Shakespeare drew on the Spanish prose romance Los Siete Libros de la Diana (The Seven Books of the Diana) by the Portuguese writer Jorge de Montemayor. In the second book of Diana, Don Felix, who is in love with Felismena, sends her a letter explaining his feelings. Like Julia, Felismena pretends to reject the letter and be annoyed with her maid for delivering it. Like Proteus, Felix is sent away by his father, and is followed by Felismena, who, disguised as a boy, becomes his page, only to subsequently learn that Felix has fallen in love with Celia. Felismena is then employed by Felix to act as his messenger in all communications with Celia, who scorns his love. Instead, Celia falls in love with the page (i.e. Felismena in disguise). Eventually, after a combat in a wood, Felix and Felismena are reunited. Upon Felismena revealing herself, however, Celia, having no counterpart to Valentine, dies of grief.

Diana was published in Spanish in 1559 and translated into French by Nicholas Collin in 1578. An English translation was made by Bartholomew Young and published in 1598, though Young claims in his preface to have finished the translation sixteen years earlier (c. 1582). Shakespeare could have read a manuscript of Young's English translation, or encountered the story in French, or learned of it from an anonymous English play, The History of Felix and Philomena, which may have been based on Diana, and which was performed for the court at Greenwich Palace by the Queen's Men on 3 January 1585. The History of Felix and Philiomena is now lost.

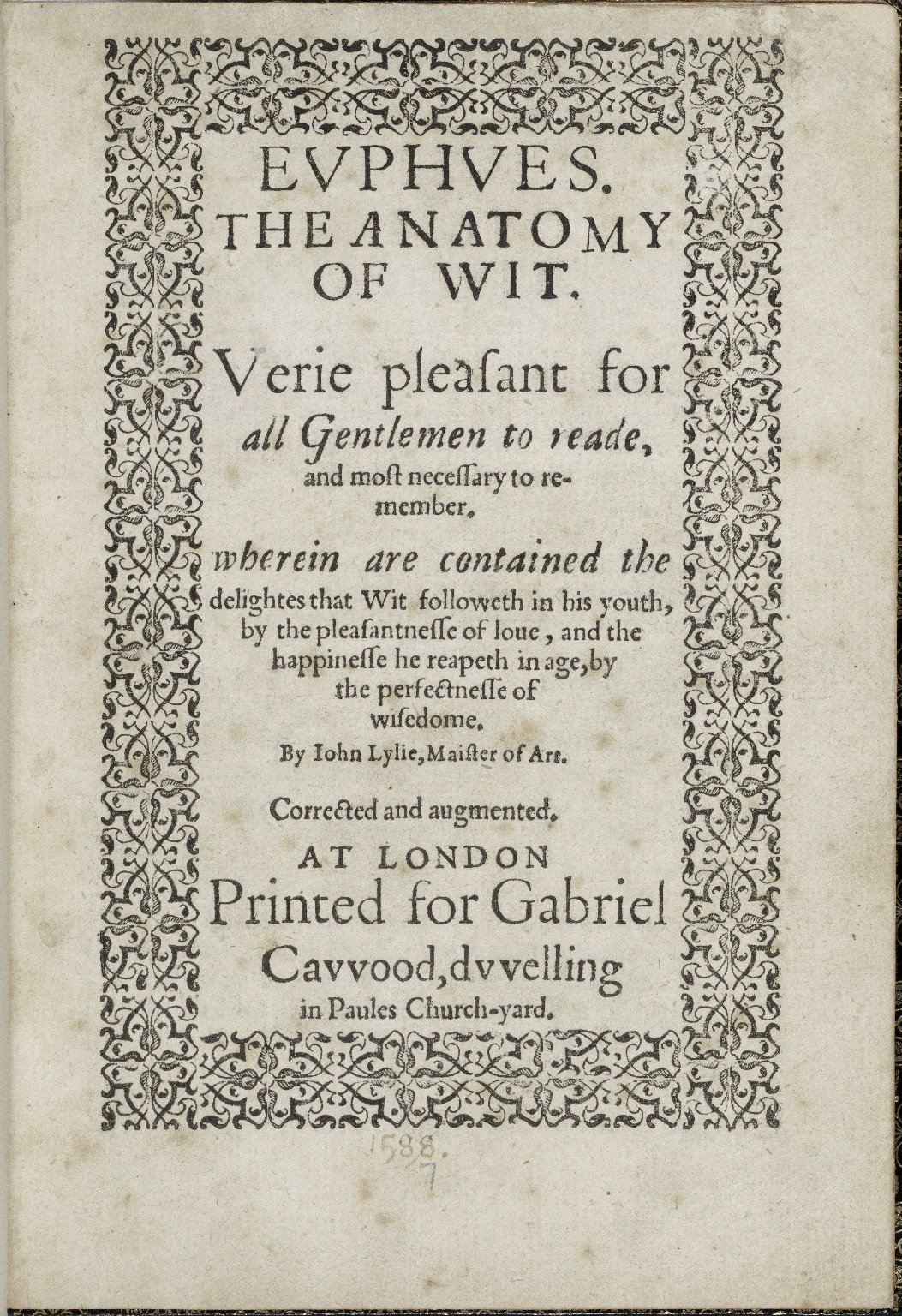
A 1587 printing of John Lyly's Euphues, The Anatomy of Wit

Another major influence on Shakespeare was the story of the intimate friendship of Titus and Gisippus as told in Thomas Elyot's The Boke Named the Governour in 1531 (the same story is told in The Decameron by Giovanni Boccaccio, but verbal similarities between The Two Gentlemen and The Governor suggest it was Elyot's work Shakespeare used as his primary source, not Boccaccio's). In this story, Titus and Gisippus are inseparable until Gisippus falls in love with Sophronia. He introduces her to Titus, but Titus is overcome with jealousy and vows to seduce her. Upon hearing of Titus' plan, Gisippus arranges for them to change places on the wedding night, thus placing their friendship above his love.

Also important to Shakespeare in the composition of the play was John Lyly's Euphues: The Anatomy of Wit, published in 1578. Like The Governor, Euphues presents two close friends who are inseparable until a woman comes between them, and, like both The Governor and Two Gentlemen, the story concludes with one friend sacrificing the woman so as to save the friendship. However, as Geoffrey Bullough argues "Shakespeare's debt to Lyly was probably one of technique more than matter." Lyly's Midas may also have influenced the scene where Launce and Speed run through the milkmaid's virtues and defects, as it contains a very similar scene between Lucio and Petulus.

Other minor sources include Arthur Brooke's narrative poem The Tragical History of Romeus and Juliet, Shakespeare's source for Romeo and Juliet. It features a character called Friar Laurence, as does Two Gentlemen, and a scene where a young man attempts to outwit his lover's father by means of a corded ladder (as Valentine does in Two Gentlemen). Philip Sidney's The Countess of Pembroke's Arcadia may also have influenced Shakespeare insofar as it contains a character who follows her betrothed, dressed as his page, and later on, one of the main characters becomes captain of a group of Helots.

== Date and text ==
=== Date ===
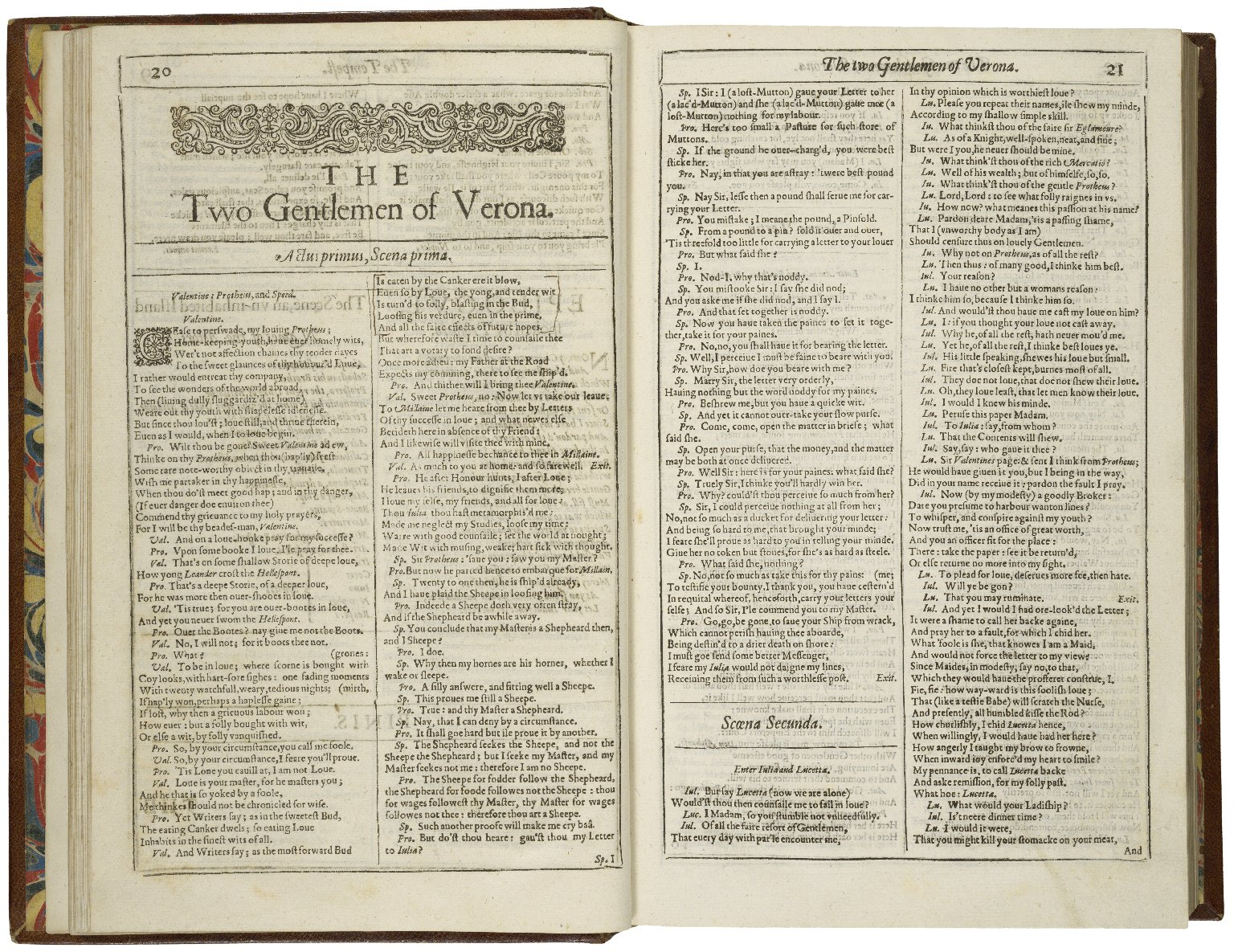
First page of The Two Gentlemen of Verona from the First Folio (1623)

The exact date of composition of The Two Gentlemen of Verona is unknown, but it is generally believed to have been one of Shakespeare's earliest works. The first evidence of its existence is in a list of Shakespeare's plays in Francis Meres's Palladis Tamia, published in 1598, but it is thought to have been written in the early 1590s. Clifford Leech, for example, argues for 1592/1593; G. Blakemore Evans places the date at 1590–1593; Gary Taylor suggests 1590–1591; Kurt Schlueter posits the late 1580s; William C. Carroll suggests 1590–1592; Roger Warren tentatively suggests 1587, but acknowledges 1590/1591 as more likely.

It has been argued that Two Gentlemen may have been Shakespeare's first work for the stage. This theory was first suggested by Edmond Malone in 1821, in the Third Variorum edition of Shakespeare's plays, edited by James Boswell based on Malone's notes. Malone dated the play 1591, a modification of his earlier 1595 date from the third edition of The Plays of William Shakespeare. At this time, the dominant theory was that the Henry VI trilogy had been Shakespeare's first work. More recently, the play was placed first in The Oxford Shakespeare: The Complete Works of 1986, again in the 2nd edition of 2005, and again in the New Oxford Shakespeare edition of 2016, in The Norton Shakespeare of 1997, and again in the 2nd edition of 2008, and in The Complete Pelican Shakespeare of 2002.

A large part of the theory that this may be Shakespeare's first play is the quality of the work itself. Writing in 1968, Norman Sanders argued "all are agreed on the play's immaturity." The argument is that the play betrays a lack of practical theatrical experience on Shakespeare's part, and as such, it must have come extremely early in his career. Stanley Wells, for example, has written the "dramatic structure is comparatively unambitious, and while some of its scenes are expertly constructed, those involving more than, at the most, four characters betray an uncertainty of technique suggestive of inexperience." This uncertainty can be seen in how Shakespeare handles the distribution of dialogue in such scenes. Whenever there are more than three characters on stage, at least one of those characters tends to fall silent. For example, Speed is silent for almost all of 2.4, as are Thurio, Silvia and Julia for most of the last half of the final scene. It has also been suggested that the handling of the final scene in general, in which the faithful lover seemingly offers his beloved as a token of his forgiveness to the man who has just attempted to rape her, is a sign of Shakespeare's lack of maturity as a dramatist.

In his 2008 edition of the play for the Oxford Shakespeare, Roger Warren argues that the play is the oldest surviving piece of Shakespearean literature, suggesting a date of composition as somewhere between 1587 and 1591. He hypothesizes that the play was perhaps written before Shakespeare came to London, with an idea towards using the famous comic actor Richard Tarlton in the role of Launce (this theory stems from the fact that Tarlton had performed several extremely popular and well-known scenes with dogs). However, Tarlton died in September 1588, and Warren notes several passages in Two Gentlemen which seem to borrow from John Lyly's Midas, which wasn't written until at least late 1589. As such, Warren acknowledges that 1590/1591 is most likely the correct date of composition.

=== Text ===
The play was not printed until 1623, when it appeared in the First Folio of Shakespeare's plays.

== Criticism and analysis ==
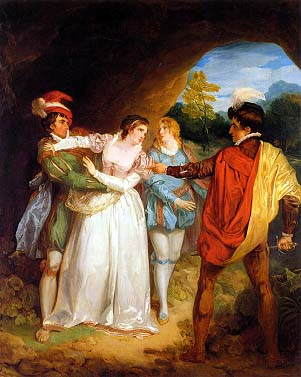
Silvia Rescued by Valentine by Francis Wheatley (1792)

=== Critical history ===
Perhaps the most critically discussed issue in the play is the sequence, bizarre by modern Western standards, in 5.4, in which Valentine seems to 'give' Silvia to Proteus as a sign of his friendship. For many years, the general critical consensus on this issue was that the incident revealed an inherent misogyny in the text. For example, Hilary Spurling wrote in 1970, "Valentine is so overcome [by Proteus's apology] that he promptly offers to hand over his beloved to the man who, not three minutes before, had meant to rape her." Modern scholarship, however, is much more divided about Valentine's actions at the end of the play, with some critics arguing that he does not offer to give Silvia to Proteus at all. The ambiguity lies in the line "All that was mine in Silvia I give thee" (5.4.83). Some critics (such as Stanley Wells, for example) interpret this to mean that Valentine is indeed handing Silvia over to her would-be rapist, but another school of thought suggests that Valentine simply means "I will love you [Proteus] with as much love as I love Silvia," thus reconciling the dichotomy of friendship and love as depicted elsewhere in the play. This is certainly how Jeffrey Masten, for example, sees it, arguing that the play as a whole "reveals not the opposition of male friendship and Petrarchan love but rather their interdependence." As such, the final scene "stages the play's ultimate collaboration of male friendship and its incorporation of the plot we would label "heterosexual"."

This is also how Roger Warren interprets the final scene. Warren cites several productions of the play as evidence for this argument, including Robin Phillips' Royal Shakespeare Company (RSC) production in 1970, where Valentine kisses Silvia, makes his offer and then kisses Proteus. Another staging cited by Warren is Edward Hall's 1998 Swan Theatre production. In Hall's version of the scene, after Valentine says the controversial line, Silvia approaches him and takes him by the hand. They remain holding hands for the rest of the play, clearly suggesting that Valentine has not 'given' her away. Warren also mentions Leon Rubin's 1984 Stratford Shakespeare Festival production (where the controversial line was altered to "All my love to Silvia I also give to thee"), David Thacker's 1991 Swan Theatre production, and the 1983 BBC Television Shakespeare adaptation as supporting the theory that Valentine is not giving Silvia away, but is simply promising to love Proteus as much as he loves Silvia. Patty S. Derrick also interprets the BBC production in this manner, arguing that "Proteus clearly perceives the offer as a noble gesture of friendship, not an actual offer, because he does not even look towards Silvia but rather falls into an embrace with Valentine" (although Derrick does raise the question that if Valentine is not offering Silvia to Proteus, why does Julia swoon?).

There are other theories regarding this final scene, however. For example, in his 1990 edition of the play for the New Cambridge Shakespeare, Kurt Schlueter suggests that Valentine is indeed handing Silvia over to Proteus, but the audience is not supposed to take it literally; the incident is farcical, and should be interpreted as such. Schlueter argues that the play provides possible evidence it was written to be performed and viewed primarily by a young audience, and as such, to be staged at university theatres, as opposed to public playhouses. Such an audience would be more predisposed to accepting the farcical nature of the scene, and more likely to find humorous the absurdity of Valentine's gift. As such, in Schlueter's theory, the scene does represent what it appears to represent; Valentine does give Silvia to her would-be rapist, but it is done purely for comic effect.

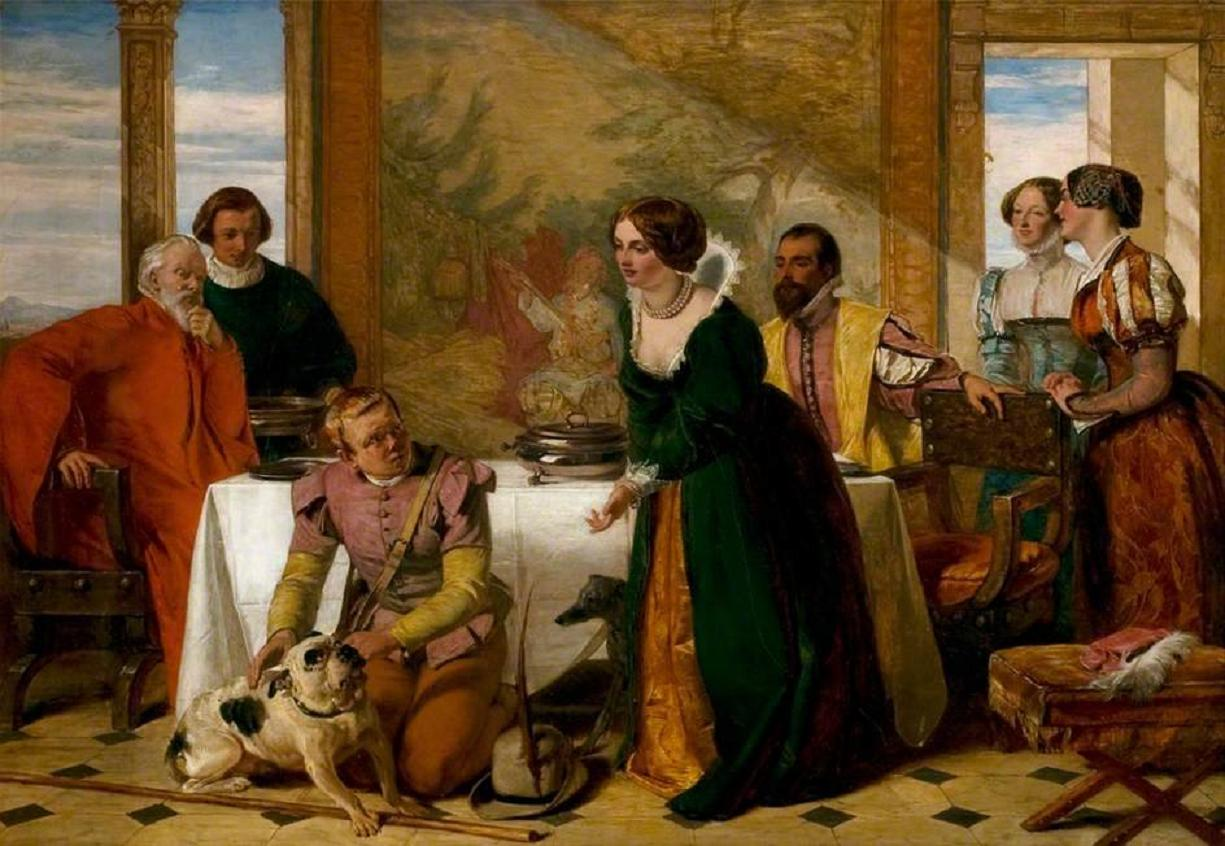
Launce's substitute for Proteus's dog by Augustus Egg (1849)

Another theory is provided by William C. Carroll in his 2004 edition for the Arden Shakespeare, Third Series. Carroll argues, like Schlueter, that Valentine is indeed giving Silvia to Proteus, but unlike Schlueter, Carroll detects no sense of farce. Instead, he sees the action as a perfectly logical one in terms of the notions of friendship which were prevalent at the time:

the idealisation of male friendship as superior to male-female love (which was considered not romantic or compassionate but merely lustful, hence inferior) performs a project of cultural nostalgia, a stepping back from potentially more threatening social arrangements to a world of order, a world based on a 'gift' economy of personal relations among male social equals rather than one based on a newer, less stable economy of emotional and economic risk. The offer of the woman from one male friend to another would therefore be the highest expression of friendship from one point of view, a low point of psycho-sexual regression from another.

As in Schlueter, Carroll here interprets Valentine's actions as a gift to Proteus, but unlike Schlueter, and more in line with traditional criticism of the play, Carroll also argues that such a gift, as unacceptable as it is to modern eyes, is perfectly understandable when one considers the cultural and social milieu of the play itself.

=== Language ===
Language is of primary importance in the play insofar as Valentine and Proteus speak in blank verse, but Launce and Speed speak (for the most part) in prose. More specifically, the actual content of many of the speeches serve to illustrate the pompousness of Valentine and Proteus's exalted outlook, and the more realistic and practical outlook of the servants. This is most apparent in 3.1. Valentine has just given a lengthy speech lamenting his banishment and musing on how he cannot possibly survive without Silvia; "Except I be by Silvia in the night/There is no music in the nightingale./Unless I look on Silvia in the day/There is no day for me to look upon" (ll.178–181). However, when Launce enters only a few lines later, he announces that he too is in love, and proceeds to outline, along with Speed, all of his betrothed's positives ("She brews good ale"; "She can knit"; "She can wash and scour"), and negatives ("She hath a sweet mouth"; "She doth talk in her sleep"; "She is slow in words"). After weighing his options, Launce decides that the woman's most important quality is that "she hath more hair than wit, and more faults than hairs, and more wealth than faults" (ll.343–344). He announces that her wealth "makes the faults gracious" (l.356), and chooses for that reason to wed her. This purely materialistic reasoning, as revealed in the form of language, is in stark contrast to the more spiritual and idealised love espoused by Valentine earlier in the scene.

=== Themes ===
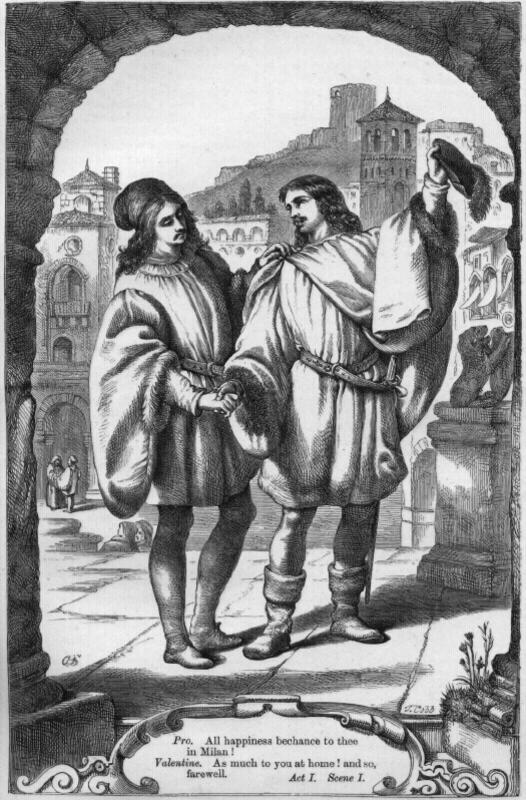
H.C. Selous' illustration of Valentine and Proteus's farewell in 1.1; from The Plays of William Shakespeare: The Comedies, edited by Charles Cowden Clarke and Mary Cowden Clarke (1830)

One of the dominant theories as regards the value of Two Gentlemen is that thematically, it represents a 'trial run' of sorts, in which Shakespeare deals briefly with themes which he would examine in more detail in later works. E. K. Chambers, for example, believed that the play represents something of a gestation of Shakespeare's great thematic concerns. Writing in 1905, Chambers stated that Two Gentlemen

was Shakespeare's first essay at originality, at fashioning for himself the outlines of that romantic or tragicomic formula in which so many of his most characteristic dramas were afterwards to be cast. Something which is neither quite tragedy nor quite comedy, something which touches the heights and depths of sentiment and reveals the dark places of the human heart without lingering long enough there to crystallise the painful impression, a love story broken for a moment into passionate chords by absence and inconstancy and intrigue, and then reunited to the music of wedding bells.

As such, the play's primary interest for critics has tended to lie in relation to what it reveals about Shakespeare's conception of certain themes before he became the accomplished playwright of later years. Writing in 1879, A. C. Swinburne, for example, states "here is the first dawn of that higher and more tender humour that was never given in such perfection to any man as ultimately to Shakespeare." Similarly, in 1906, Warwick R. Bond writes "Shakespeare first opens the vein he worked so richly afterwards – the vein of crossed love, of flight and exile under the escort of the generous sentiments; of disguised heroines, and sufferings endured and virtues exhibited under their disguise; and of the Providence, kinder than life, that annuls the errors and forgives the sin." More recently, Stanley Wells has referred to the play as a "dramatic laboratory in which Shakespeare first experimented with the conventions of romantic comedy which he would later treat with a more subtle complexity, but it has its own charm."

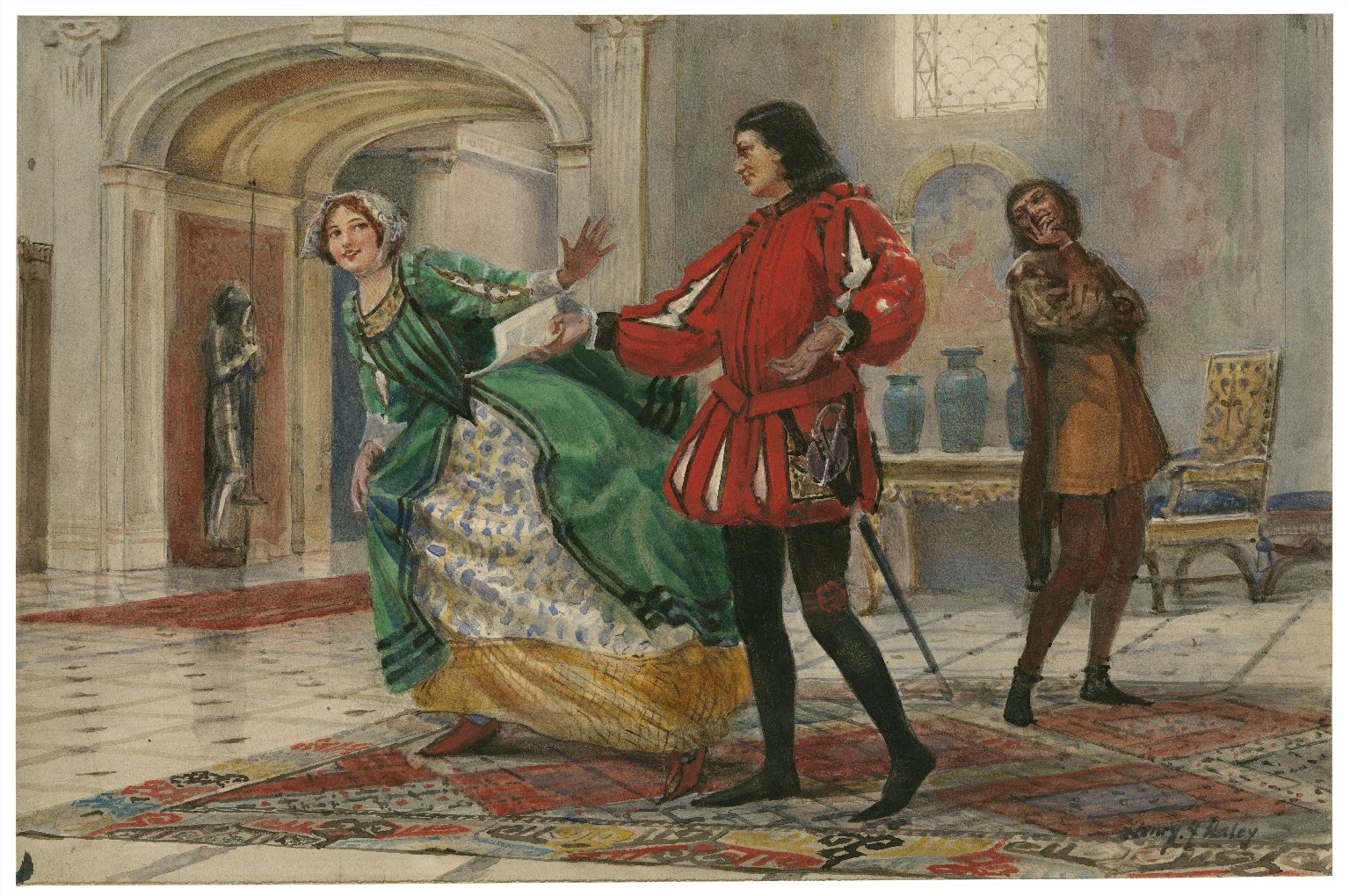
Early 20th-century Henry James Haley illustration of 2.1 (Silvia refusing Valentine's letter)

Other critics have been less kind, however, arguing that if the later plays show a skilled and confident writer exploring serious issues of the human heart, Two Gentlemen represents the initial, primarily unsuccessful attempt to do likewise. In 1921, for example, J. Dover Wilson and Arthur Quiller-Couch, in their edition of the play for the Cambridge Shakespeare, famously stated that after hearing Valentine offer Silvia to Proteus "one's impulse, upon this declaration, is to remark that there are, by this time, no gentlemen in Verona." H.B. Charlton, writing in 1938, argues that "clearly, Shakespeare's first attempt to make romantic comedy had only succeeded so far as it had unexpectedly and inadvertently made romance comic." Another such argument is provided by Norman Sanders in 1968; "because the play reveals a relatively unsure dramatist and many effects managed with a tiro's lack of expertise, it offers us an opportunity to see more clearly than anywhere else in the canon what were to become characteristic techniques. It stands as an 'anatomie' or show-through version, as it were, of Shakespeare's comic art." Kurt Schlueter, on the other hand, argues that critics have been too harsh on the play precisely because the later plays are so much superior. He suggests that when looking at Shakespeare's earlier works, scholars put too much emphasis on how they fail to measure up to the later works, rather than looking at them for their own intrinsic merits; "we should not continue the practice of holding his later achievements against him when dealing with his early beginnings."

==== Love and friendship ====
Norman Sanders calls the play "almost a complete anthology of the practices of the doctrine of romantic love which inspired the poetic and prose Romances of the period." At the very centre of this is the contest between love and friendship; "an essential part of the comicality of The Two Gentlemen of Verona is created by the necessary conflict between highly stylised concepts of love and friendship." This is manifested in the question of whether the relationship between two male friends is more important than that between lovers, encapsulated by Proteus's rhetorical question at 5.4.54; "In love/Who respects friend?" This question "exposes the raw nerve at the heart of the central relationships, the dark reality lurking beneath the wit and lyricism with which the play has in general presented lovers' behaviour." In the program notes for John Barton's 1981 RSC production at the Royal Shakespeare Theatre, Anne Barton, his wife, wrote that the central theme of the play was "how to bring love and friendship into a constructive and mutually enhancing relationship." As William C. Carroll points out, this is a common theme in Renaissance literature, which often celebrates friendship as the more important relationship (because it is pure and unconcerned with sexual attraction), and contends that love and friendship cannot co-exist. As actor Alex Avery argues, "The love between two men is a greater love for some reason. There seems to be a sense that the function of a male/female relationship is purely for the family and to procreate, to have a family. But a love between two men is something that you choose. You have arranged marriages, [but] a friendship between two men is created by the desires and wills of those two men, whereas a relationship between a man and a girl is actually constructed completely peripheral to whatever the feelings of the said boy and girl are."

Carroll sees this societal belief as vital in interpreting the final scene of the play, arguing that Valentine does give Silvia to Proteus, and in so doing, he is merely acting in accordance with the practices of the day. However, if one accepts that Valentine does not give Silvia to Proteus, as critics such as Jeffrey Masten argue, but instead offers to love Proteus as much as he loves Silvia, then the conclusion of the play can be read as a final triumphant reconciliation between friendship and love; Valentine intends to love his friend as much as he does his betrothed. Love and friendship are shown to be co-existent, not exclusive.

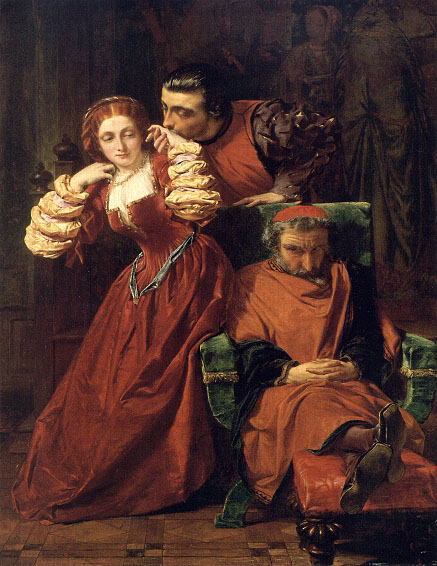
Scene from The Two Gentlemen of Verona (Valentine woos Silvia; the Duke sits nearby, pretending to be asleep) by Alfred Elmore (1857)

==== Foolishness of lovers ====
Another major theme is the foolishness of lovers, what Roger Warren refers to as "mockery of the absurdity of conventional lovers' behaviour." Valentine for example, is introduced into the play mocking the excesses of love; "To be in love, where scorn is bought with groans/Coy looks with heart-sore sighs, one fading moment's mirth/With twenty watchful, weary, tedious nights" (1.1.29–31). Later, however, he becomes as much a prisoner of love as Proteus, exclaiming, "For in revenge of my contempt for love/Love hath chased sleep from my enthrall'd eyes/And made them watchers of my own heart's sorrow" (2.4.131–133).

The majority of the cynicism and mockery as regards conventional lovers, however, comes from Launce and Speed, who serve as foils for the two protagonists, and "supply a mundane view of the idealistic flights of fancy indulged in by Proteus and Valentine." Several times in the play, after either Valentine or Proteus has made an eloquent speech about love, Shakespeare introduces either Launce or Speed (or both), whose more mundane concerns serve to undercut what has just been said, thus exposing Proteus and Valentine to mockery. For example, in 2.1Act 2, Scene 1, as Valentine and Silvia engage in a game of flirtation, hinting at their love for one another, Speed provides constant asides which serve to directly mock the couple;

Valentine: "Peace, here she comes."
[Enter Silvia]
Speed (aside): "O excellent motion! O exceeding puppet! Now he will interpret her."
Valentine: "Madame and mistress, a thousand good-morrows."
Speed (aside): "O, give ye good e'en. Here's a million of manners."
Silvia: "Sir Valentine and servant, to you two thousand."
Speed (aside): "He should give her interest, and she gives it him."
(2.1.85–94)

==== Inconstancy ====
A third major theme is inconstancy, particularly as manifested in Proteus, whose very name hints at his changeable mind (in Ovid's Metamorphoses, Proteus is a sea-god forever changing its shape). At the start of the play, Proteus has only eyes for Julia. However, upon meeting Silvia, he immediately falls in love with her (although he has no idea why). He then finds himself drawn to the page Sebastian (Julia in disguise) whilst still trying to woo Silvia, and at the end of the play, he announces that Silvia is no better than Julia and vows he now loves Julia again. Indeed, Proteus himself seems to be aware of this mutability, pointing out towards the end of the play; "O heaven, were man/But constant, he were perfect. That one error/Fills him with faults, makes him run through all th'sins;/Inconstancy falls off ere it begins" (5.4.109–112).

== Performance ==
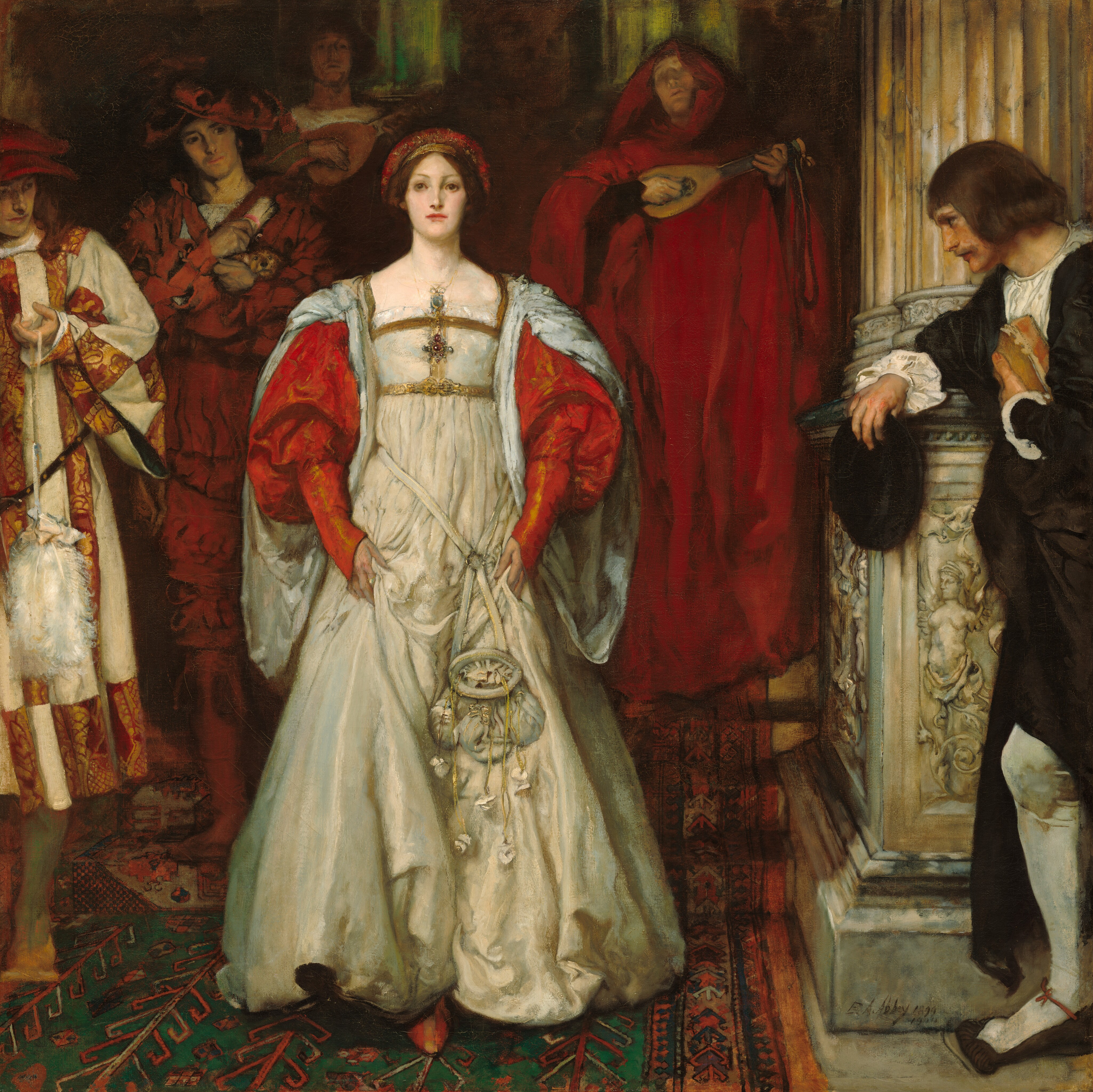
Who is Sylvia – What is she, that all the swains commend her by Edwin Austin Abbey (1899)

There is no record of a performance during Shakespeare's lifetime, although due to its inclusion in Francis Meres' Palladis Tamia, we know the play had definitely been performed by 1598. The earliest known performance was at Drury Lane in 1762. However, this production was of a version of the play rewritten by Benjamin Victor. The earliest known performance of the straight Shakespearean text was at Covent Garden in 1784, advertised as "Shaxespeare's with alterations." Although the play was supposed to run for several weeks, it closed after the first night.

From the middle of the eighteenth century, even if staging Shakespeare's original (as opposed to Victor's rewrite) it was common to cut the lines in the final scene where Valentine seems to offer Silvia to Proteus. This practice prevailed until William Macready reintroduced the lines in 1841 in a production at Drury Lane, although they were still being removed as late as 1952, in Denis Carey's production at the Bristol Old Vic. Notable nineteenth-century performances include Charles Kean's 1848 production at the Haymarket Theatre, Samuel Phelps' 1857 production at Sadler's Wells Theatre and William Poel's 1892 and 1896 productions.

During the twentieth century, the play has been produced sporadically in the English-speaking world, although it has proved more popular in Europe. Indeed, there have been only a few significant English-speaking productions. Little is known, for example, about Harley Granville-Barker's 1904 production at the Court Theatre, F.R. Benson's 1910 production at the Shakespeare Memorial Theatre, Robert Atkins' 1923 production at the Apollo Theatre, or Ben Iden Payne's 1938 production at Stratford-upon-Avon. The earliest production about which we have significant information is Michael Langham's 1957 production at The Old Vic, starring Richard Gale as Valentine, Keith Michell as Proteus, Barbara Jefford as Julia and Ingrid Hafner as Silvia. In this production, set in late nineteenth-century Italy and grounded very much in high Romanticism, Proteus threatens to kill himself with a pistol at the end of the play, prompting Valentine's hasty offer of Silvia.

Perhaps the most notable 20th-century production was Peter Hall's 1960 production at the Royal Shakespeare Theatre. Set in a late medieval milieu, the play starred Denholm Elliott as Valentine, Derek Godfrey as Proteus, Susan Maryott as Silvia, Frances Cuka as Julia, and featured a much-lauded performance by Patrick Wymark as Launce. Hall had only recently been appointed as artistic director of the RSC, and, somewhat unexpectedly, he chose Two Gentlemen as his inaugural production, billed as the opening show in a re-examination of the development of Shakespearean comedy.

Ten years later, in 1970, Robin Phillips' RSC production starred Peter Egan as Valentine, Ian Richardson as Proteus, Helen Mirren as Julia, Estelle Kohler as Silvia, and Patrick Stewart as Launce. This production concentrated on the issues of friendship and treachery and set the play in a decadent world of social elitism. Valentine and Proteus were presented as aristocratic students, the Duke was a Don, and Eglamour an old scoutmaster. On the other hand, the poverty-stricken outlaws were dressed in animal skins.

The RSC again staged the play at the Royal Shakespeare Theatre in 1981, as a double bill with Titus Andronicus, with both plays heavily edited. Directed by John Barton, the production starred Peter Chelsom as Valentine, Peter Land as Proteus, Julia Swift as Julia and Diana Hardcastle as Silvia. This production saw the actors not involved in the current on-stage scene sit at the front of the stage and watch the performance. Leon Rubin directed a performance at the Stratford Shakespeare Festival in 1984, where the actors were dressed in modern clothes and contemporary pop music was featured within the play (for example, the outlaws are portrayed as an anarchic rock group).

A 1991 RSC production at the Swan Theatre saw director David Thacker use an on-stage band for the duration of the play, playing music from the 1930s, such as Cole Porter and George Gershwin. Thacker's production featured Hugh Bonneville (then billed as Richard Bonneville) as Valentine, Finbar Lynch as Proteus, Clare Holman as Julia and Saskia Reeves as Silvia. In 1992, Thacker's production moved to the Barbican Centre, and in 1993 went on regional tour. In 1996, Jack Shepherd directed a modern dress version at the Royal National Theatre as part of Shakespeare's Globe's "Prologue Season". The production starred Lenny James as Valentine, Mark Rylance as Proteus, Stephanie Roth Haberle as Julia and Anastasia Hille as Silvia. Another RSC production took place at the Swan in 1998, under the direction of Edward Hall, and starring Tom Goodman-Hill as Valentine, Dominic Rowan as Proteus, Lesley Vickerage as Julia and Poppy Miller as Silvia. This production set the play in a grimy unnamed contemporary city where material obsession was all-encompassing.

Valentine (Alex Avery), Silvia (Rachel Pickup) and Proteus (Laurence Mitchell) in the 2004 Fiona Buffini production

In 2004, Fiona Buffini directed a touring production for the RSC. Premiering at the Swan, the production starred Alex Avery as Valentine, Laurence Mitchell as Proteus, Vanessa Ackerman as Julia and Rachel Pickup as Silvia. Buffini set the play in a swinging 1930s milieu, and featuring numerous dance numbers. Additionally, London and New York replaced Verona and Milan; initially, Valentine and Proteus are shown as living in the English countryside, in a rural paradise devoid of any real vitality, the sons of wealthy families who have retired from the city. When Valentine leaves, he heads to New York to pursue the American Dream and falls in love with Silvia, the famous actress daughter of a powerful media magnate. Another change to the play was that the roles of the outlaws (represented here as a group of paparazzi) were increased considerably. Scenes added to the play show them arriving in New York and going about their daily business, although none of the new scenes featured any dialogue. Another performance worth noting occurred at the Courtyard Theatre in Stratford in 2006. A non-professional acting company from Brazil, named Nós do Morro, in collaboration with a Gallery 37 group from Birmingham, gave a single performance of the play during the RSC's presentation of the Complete Works, directed by Guti Fraga. The production was spoken in Portuguese, with the original English text projected as surtitles onto the back of the stage. It also featured two 17-year-olds in the roles of Valentine and Proteus (usually, actors in their 20s are cast), and Crab was played not by a dog, but by a human actor in a dog costume. In 2009, Joe Dowling directed the play at the Guthrie Theater, starring Sam Bardwell as Valentine, Jonas Goslow as Proteus, Sun Mee Chomet as Julia and Valeri Mudek as Silvia. Staged as a 1950s live television production, large black-and-white monitors were set on either side of the stage, with cameras feeding the action to them. Additionally, period advertisements appeared both before the show and during the intermission. The actors spoke the original dialogue but wore 1950s clothing. Rock and roll music and dance sequences were occasionally mixed with the action.

In 2011, Laura Cole directed a production at the Shakespeare Tavern. Presented as an "in repertory" production, alongside The Taming of the Shrew and The Comedy of Errors, it starred Kenneth Wigley as Valentine, Jonathan Horne as Proteus, Amee Vyas as Julia and Kati Grace Morton as Silvia. In 2012, P.J. Paparelli directed a Shakespeare Theatre Company production at the Lansburgh Theatre, starring Andrew Veenstra as Valentine, Nick Dillenburg as Proteus, Natalie Mitchell as Silvia and Miriam Silverman as Julia. Set in the 1990s, and featuring a contemporary soundtrack, mobile phones and guns, the production downplayed the comedy and instead presented the play as a semi-tragic coming-of-age story. Reviews were mixed, with most critics impressed with the attempts to do something new with the play, but not universally sure the new ideas worked. Also in 2012, a touring production was staged at various venues throughout the UK, including a performance at the Globe Theatre as part of the Globe to Globe Festival, under the name Vakomana Vaviri Ve Zimbabwe (The Two Gentlemen from Zimbabwe). Directed by Arne Pohlmeier, and spoken in Shona, the entire play was performed with a cast of two; Denton Chikura and Tonderai Munyevu. In 2014, for the first time since Robin Phillips' 1970 production, the RSC performed the play in a full production at the Royal Shakespeare Theatre. Directed by Simon Godwin, the production starred Michael Marcus as Valentine, Mark Arends as Proteus, Pearl Chanda as Julia and Sarah MacRae as Silvia. On 3 September, the play was broadcast live to cinemas around the world as part of the "Live from Stratford-upon-Avon" series. The production received generally positive reviews, with most critics happy to see it back on the RSC stage.

== Adaptations ==
=== Theatrical ===
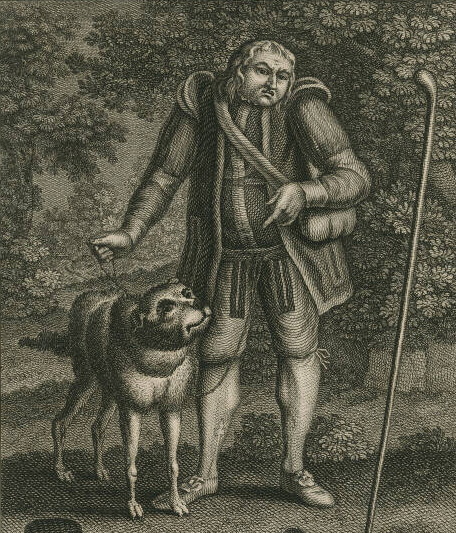
Henry Roberts' engraving of Richard Yates as Launce in the 1762 Drury Lane adaptation by Benjamin Victor

Benjamin Victor rewrote the play for performance in 1762 (the earliest recorded performance we have of the play), at the Theatre Royal in Drury Lane. Starring Richard Yates as Launce, his wife, Mary Ann Yates as Julia and Elizabeth Pope as Silvia, Victor brought all of the Verona scenes together, removed Valentine's 'gift' of Silvia to Proteus and increased the roles of Launce and Crab (especially during the outlaw scenes, where both characters are intimately involved in the action). He also switched the emphasis of the play away from the love-friendship dichotomy and instead focused on the issues of fidelity, with the last line of the play altered to, "Lovers must be faithful to be bless'd." This necessitated rewriting Valentine as a near-flawless protagonist who represents such faithfulness, and Proteus as a traditional villain, who does not care for such notions. The two are not presented as old friends, but simply as acquaintances. Thurio was also rewritten as a harmless, but lovable fool, not unlike Launce and Speed. Although not a major success (the play initially ran for only six performances), it was still being staged as late as 1895.

In 1790, John Philip Kemble staged his own production of the play at Drury Lane, maintaining many of Victor's alterations whilst also adding many of his own. The production starred Richard Wroughton as Proteus and Elizabeth Satchell as Silvia. The play was again staged at Covent Garden in 1808, with Kemble, who was fifty years old at the time, playing Valentine.

The name of Edward Albee's 2002 Broadway play The Goat, or Who Is Sylvia? references Proteus's song to Silvia.

=== Opera/musical ===
Frederic Reynolds staged an operatic version in 1821 at Covent Garden as part of his series of adaptations of the works of Shakespeare. Reynolds wrote the lyrics, with Henry Bishop writing the music. The production ran for twenty-nine performances, and included some of Shakespeare's sonnets set to music. Augustin Daly revived the opera in 1895 at Daly's Theatre, in an elaborate production starring Ada Rehan as Julia.

In 1826, Franz Schubert set a German translation by Eduard von Bauernfeld of Proteus's serenade to Silvia ("Who is Silvia? What is she,/That all our swains commend her?") to music. This song is usually known in English as "Who is Sylvia?," but in German it is known as "An Sylvia" ("Vier Lieder", opus 106, number 4, D. 891). In 1909, Eric Coates's "Four Old English Songs" included a setting of "Who is Sylvia". In 1942, Gerald Finzi included a setting of "Who Is Silvia?" in his song cycle on Shakespearean texts Let Us Garlands Bring; the title of the work is the last line of the song.

In 1971, Galt MacDermot, John Guare and Mel Shapiro adapted the show into a rock musical under the same name as the play. Guare and Shapiro wrote the book, Guare the lyrics, and MacDermot the music. Opening at the St. James Theatre on 1 December 1971, with Shapiro directing and Jean Erdman as choreographer, it ran for 614 performances, closing on 20 May 1973. During its initial run, the play won two Tony Awards; Best Musical and Best Book. The original cast included Clifton Davis as Valentine, Raul Julia as Proteus, Jonelle Allen as Silvia and Diana Dávila as Julia. The play moved to the West End in 1973, playing at the Phoenix Theatre from 26 April, and running for 237 performances. It was revived in 1996 at the New Jersey Shakespeare Festival, directed by Robert Duke, and again in 2005, directed and choreographed by Kathleen Marshall as part of the Shakespeare in the Park festival. Marshall's production was performed at the Delacorte Theater in Central Park, and starred Norm Lewis as Valentine, Oscar Isaac as Proteus, Renée Elise Goldsberry as Silvia and Rosario Dawson as Julia.

=== Film ===
The only cinematic adaptation of the play is Yī jiǎn méi (more commonly known by its English title A Spray of Plum Blossoms), a 1931 silent film from China, directed by Bu Wancang and written by Huang Yicuo. A loose adaptation of the play, the film tells the story of Bai Lede (Wang Chilong) and Hu Luting (Jin Yan), two military cadets who have been friends since they were children. After graduating, Hu, a playboy uninterested in love, is appointed as a captain in Guangdong and leaves his home town in Shanghai. Bai however, deeply in love with Hu's sister, Hu Zhuli (Ruan Lingyu) stays behind. At Guangdong, Hu falls in love with the local general's daughter, Shi Luohua (Lim Cho-cho), although the general, Shi (Wang Guilin), is unaware of the relationship, and instead wants his daughter to marry the foolish Liao Di'ao (Kao Chien Fei). Meanwhile, Bai's father uses his influence to get Bai posted to Guangdong, and after a sorrowful farewell between himself and Zhuli, he arrives at his new post and instantly falls in love with Luohua. In an effort to have her for himself, Bai betrays his friend, by informing General Shi of his daughter's plans to elope with Hu, leading to Shi dishonourably discharging Hu. Bai tries to win Luohua over, but she is uninterested, only concerned with lamenting the loss of Hu. In the meantime, Hu encounters a group of bandits who ask him to be their leader, to which he agrees, planning on returning for Luohua at some point in the future. Some time passes, and one day, as Luohua, Bai and Liao are passing through the forest, they are attacked. Luohua manages to flee, and Bai pursues her into the forest. They engage in an argument, but just as Bai seems about to lose his temper, Hu intervenes, and he and Luohua are reunited. General Shi arrives in time to see Liao flee the scene, and he now realises that he was wrong to get in the way of the relationship between Hu and his daughter. Hu then forgives Bai his betrayal, and Bai reveals that he has discovered that his only true love is Zhuli back in Shanghai. The film is notable for being one of many Chinese films of the period which, although performed in Mandarin when filming, used English intertitles upon its original release. In the English intertitles and credits, the characters are named after their counterparts in the play; Hu is Valentine, Bai is Proteus, Zhuli is Julia and Luohua is Silvia. Liao is named Tiburio rather than Thurio.

Two Gentlemen is also featured in Shakespeare in Love (1998). Directed by John Philip Madden and written by Marc Norman and Tom Stoppard, the film tells the fictional story of William Shakespeare's (Joseph Fiennes) composition of Romeo and Juliet. Early in the film, Queen Elizabeth (Judi Dench) attends a production of Two Gentlemen, greatly enjoying William Kempe (Patrick Barlow) being thoroughly outperformed by Crab, and then falling asleep during Henry Condell's (Nicholas Boulton) recitation of Proteus's soliloquy from 2.1. Later, after reading the first draft of Romeo and Ethel, theatre manager Philip Henslowe (Geoffrey Rush) suggests that Shakespeare add a dog to liven the play up.

=== Television ===
The first television adaptation was in 1952, when BBC Television Service broadcast Act 1 of the play live from the Bristol Old Vic. Directed by Denis Carey, the production starred John Neville as Valentine, Laurence Payne as Proteus, Gudrun Ure as Silvia and Pamela Ann as Julia.

In 1956, the entire play was broadcast on West German TV channel Das Erste from a performance at the Munich Kammerspiele, under the title Zwei Herren aus Verona. The theatrical production was directed by Hans Schalla, with the TV adaptation directed by Ernst Markwardt. The cast included Rolf Schult as Valentine, Hannes Riesenberger as Proteus, Helga Siemers as Julia and Isolde Chlapek as Silvia. In 1964, the play was made into a TV movie in West Germany, again using the title Zwei Herren aus Verona. Screened on ZDF, it was directed by Hans Dieter Schwarze and starred Norbert Hansing as Valentine, Rolf Becker as Proteus, Katinka Hoffman as Julia and Heidelinde Weis as Silvia. Another West German TV movie, under the title Die zwei herren aus Verona, was screened on Das Erste in 1966. Directed by Harald Benesch, it starred Jürgen Kloth as Valentine, Lothar Berg as Proteus, Anne-Marie Lermon as Julia and Carola Regnier as Silvia. In 1969, the entire play was broadcast on Austrian TV channel ORF eins from a performance at the Theater in der Josefstadt, under the title Zwei aus Verona. The theatrical production was directed by Edwin Zbonek, with the TV adaptation directed by Wolfgang Lesowsky. The cast included Klaus Maria Brandauer as Valentine, Albert Rueprecht as Proteus, Kitty Speiser as Julia and Brigitte Neumeister as Silvia.

An outlaw hides in the "Christmas at Selfridges" set (note the stylised steel 'trees' and tinsel foliage).

In 1983, the play was adapted for the BBC Television Shakespeare series, as the fourth episode of the sixth season. Directed by Don Taylor, it starred Tyler Butterworth as Proteus, John Hudson as Valentine, Tessa Peake-Jones as Julia and Joanne Pearce as Silvia. For the most part, the adaptation is taken verbatim from the First Folio, with some very minor differences. For example, omitted lines include the Duke's "Knowing that tender youth is soon suggested" (3.1.34), and Julia's "Her eyes are grey as glass, and so are mine" (4.4.189). Other differences include a slightly different opening scene to that indicated in the text. Whereas the play seems to open with Valentine and Proteus in mid-conversation, the adaptation begins with Mercatio and Eglamour attempting to formally woo Julia; Mercatio by showing her a coffer overflowing with gold coins, Eglamour by displaying a parchment detailing his ancestry. Neither Eglamour nor Mercatio appear in the text. However, there is no dialogue in this scene, and the first words spoken are the same as in the text ("Cease to persuade my loving Proteus"). Eglamour is also present in the final scene, albeit once again without any dialogue, and, additionally, the capture of Silvia and the flight of Eglamour is seen, as opposed to merely being described. The music for the episode was created by Anthony Rooley, who wrote new arrangements of works from Shakespeare's own time, such as John Dowland's "Lachrimae". Performed by The Consort of Musicke, other musicians whose music was used include William Byrd, Thomas Campion, Anthony Holborne, John Johnson, Thomas Morley and Orazio Vecchi.

Taylor initially planned a representational setting for the film; Verona, Milan and the forest were all to be realistic. However, he changed his mind early in preproduction and had production designer Barbara Gosnold go in the opposite direction – a stylised setting. To this end, the forest is composed of metal poles with bits of green tinsel and brown sticks stuck to them (the cast and crew referred to the set as "Christmas at Selfridges"). Whilst the set for Verona remained relatively realistic, that for Milan featured young actors dressed like cherubs as extras. This was to convey the idea that the characters lived in a 'Garden of Courtly Love', which was slightly divorced from the everyday reality represented by Verona. Working in tandem with this idea, upon Proteus's arrival in Milan, after meeting Silvia, he is left alone on screen, and the weather suddenly changes from calm and sunny to cloudy and windy, accompanied by a thunderclap. The implication being that Proteus has brought a darkness within him into the garden of courtly delights previously experienced by Silvia. Although the production is edited in a fairly conventional manner, much of it was shot in extremely long takes, and then edited into sections, rather than actually shooting in sections. Director Don Taylor would shoot most of the scenes in single takes, as he felt this enhanced performances and allowed actors to discover aspects which they never would were everything broken up into pieces.

In 1995, a production of the play aired on Polish TV channel TVP1 under the title Dwaj panowie z Werony, directed by Roland Rowiński and starring Rafal Krolikowski as Proteus, Marek Bukowski as Valentine, Agnieszka Krukówna as Julia and Edyta Jungowska as Sylvia.

In 2000, episode three of season four of Dawson's Creek, "Two Gentlemen of Capeside" loosely adapted the plot of the play. Written by Chris Levinson and Jeffrey Stepakoff, and directed by Sandy Smolan, the episode depicts how Dawson Leery (James Van Der Beek) and Pacey Witter (Joshua Jackson), formerly best friends, have been driven apart over their love for the same woman. The play is referenced early in the episode as the characters are reading it for their English class.

=== Radio ===
In 1923, extracts from the play were broadcast on BBC Radio, performed by the Cardiff Station Repertory Company as the first episode of a series of programs showcasing Shakespeare's plays, entitled Shakespeare Night. In 1924, the entire play was broadcast by 2BD, directed by Joyce Tremayne and R.E. Jeffrey, with Treymane playing Silvia and Jeffrey playing Valentine, alongside G.R. Harvey as Proteus and Daisy Moncur as Julia. In 1927, the scenes between Julia and Lucetta were broadcast on BBC Radio as part of the Echoes from Greenwich Theatre series. Betty Rayner played Julia and Joan Rayner played Lucetta. BBC National Programme broadcast the full play in 1934, adapted for radio by Barbara Burnham and produced by Lance Sieveking. Ion Swinley played Valentine, Robert Craven was Proteus, Helen Horsey was Silvia and Lydia Sherwood played Julia.

In 1958, the entire play was broadcast on BBC Third Programme. Produced and directed by Raymond Raikes, it starred John Westbrook as Valentine, Charles Hodgson as Proteus, Caroline Leigh as Silvia, Perlita Neilson as Julia, and Frankie Howerd as Launce. BBC Third Programme aired another full production of the play in 1968, produced and directed by R.D. Smith and starring Denys Hawthorne as Valentine, Michael N. Harbour as Proteus, Judi Dench as Julia and Kate Coleridge as Silvia.

In 2007, producer Roger Elsgood and director Willi Richards adapted the play into a radio drama called The Two Gentlemen of Valasna. Set in two Indian princely states called Malpur and Valasna in the weeks leading up to the Indian Rebellion of 1857, the play was first broadcast on BBC Radio 3 on 29 July 2007. It was recorded on location in Maharashtra, India earlier in 2007 with a cast drawn from Bollywood, Indian television and the Mumbai English-speaking theatre traditions; actors included Nadir Khan as Vishvadev (i.e. Valentine), Arghya Lahiri as Parminder (Proteus), Anuradha Menon as Syoni (Silvia), Avantika Akerkar as Jumaana/Servi (Julia/Sebastian), Sohrab Ardishir as The Maharaja (Duke of Milan) and Zafar Karachiwala as Thaqib (Thurio).
