= Jorge de Montemor =

16th century Portuguese novelist and poet

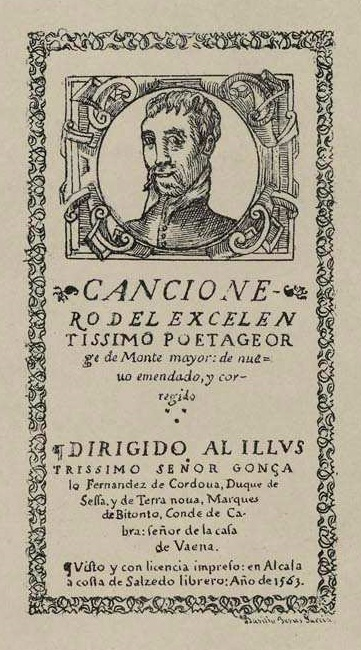
1869 facsimile of a 1563 edition of his poetry

Jorge de Montemor (Spanish: Jorge de Montemayor; c. 1520 – 26 February 1561) was a Portuguese novelist and poet, who wrote almost exclusively in Spanish. His most famous work is a pastoral prose romance, the Diana (1559).

== Biography ==
Montemor was born in Montemor-o-Velho (near Coimbra), whence he derived his name, the Spanish form of which is Montemayor.

He seems to have studied music in his youth, and to have gone to Spain in 1543 as chorister in the suite of the Portuguese Infanta Maria, first wife of Philip II. In 1552 he went back to Portugal in the suite of the Infanta Juana, wife of João Manuel, Prince of Portugal, and on the death of this prince in 1554 returned to Spain. He is said to have served in the army, to have accompanied Philip II to England in 1555, and to have travelled through Italy and the Low Countries; but it is certain that his poetical works were published in Antwerp in 1554, and again in 1558.

His reputation is based on a prose work, the Diana, a pastoral romance published about 1559. Shortly afterwards, Montemor was killed in Piedmont, apparently in a love affair; a late edition of the Diana gives the exact date of his death.

The Diana is generally stated to have been printed in Valencia in 1542; but, as the Canto de Orfeo refers to the widowhood of the Infanta Juana in 1554, the book must be of later date.

It is important as the first pastoral novel published in Spain; as the starting-point of a widespread literary fashion; and as the indirect source, through the translation included in Barnabe Googe's Eglogs, epytaphes and sonnets (1563), of an episode in The Two Gentlemen of Verona. Though Portuguese was Montemor's native language, he only used it for two songs and a short prose passage in the sixth book of the Diana. Miguel de Cervantes, who judges the verses in the Diana with severity, recognizes the merit of Montemor's prose style. That it pleased its generation is proved by the seventeen editions and two continuations of the Diana published in the 16th century, by parodies, imitations and renderings in French and English.
