= 16th century in literature =

This article presents lists of literary events and publications in the 16th century.

== Events ==
1501

- Italic type (cut by Francesco Griffo) is first used by Aldus Manutius at the Aldine Press in Venice, in an octavo edition of Virgil's Aeneid. He also publishes an edition of Petrarch's Le cose volgari and first adopts his dolphin and anchor device.

1502

- Aldine Press editions appear of Dante's Divine Comedy, Herodotus's Histories and Sophocles.

1507

- King James IV grants a patent for the first printing press in Scotland to Walter Chapman and Andrew Myllar.

1508

- April 4 – John Lydgate's The Complaint of the Black Knight becomes the first book printed in Scotland.
- The earliest known printed edition of the chivalric romance Amadis de Gaula, as edited and expanded by Garci Rodríguez de Montalvo, is published in Castilian at Zaragoza.
- Elia Levita completes writing the Bovo-Bukh.

1509

- Desiderius Erasmus writes The Praise of Folly while staying with Thomas More in England.

1510

- April 10 – Henry Cornelius Agrippa pens the dedication of De occulta philosophia libri tres to Johannes Trithemius.

1510–1511

- Ein kurtzweilig Lesen von Dyl Ulenspiegel, geboren uß dem Land zu Brunßwick, wie er sein leben volbracht hat ... is published by printer Hans Grüninger in Strassburg in Early New High German, the first appearance of the trickster character Till Eulenspiegel in print.

1512

- The word "masque" is first used to denote a poetic drama.

1513

- The Aldine Press editiones principes of Lycophron, Lysias, Pindar and Plato is published by Aldus Manutius in Venice.
- Niccolò Machiavelli is banished from Florence by the House of Medici and writes The Prince as De Principatibus (On Principalities) in Tuscany this summer.
- Johannes Potken publishes the first Ge'ez text, Psalterium David et Cantica aliqua, at Rome.

1514

- May 15 – The earliest printed edition of Saxo Grammaticus' 12th-century Scandinavian history Gesta Danorum, edited by Christiern Pedersen from an original found near Lund, is published as Danorum Regum heroumque Historiae by Jodocus Badius in Paris.
- Gregorio de Gregorii begins printing Kitab Salat al-Sawa'i (a Christian book of hours), the first known book printed in the Arabic alphabet using movable type. It is falsely assigned in Venice to Fano.

1515

- Christoph Froschauer becomes the first printer in Zürich.

1516

- Samuel Nedivot prints the 14th-century Hebrew Sefer Abudirham in Fez, the first book printed in Africa.
- Paolo Ricci translates the 13th-century Kabbalistic work Sha'are Orah by Joseph ben Abraham Gikatilla as Portae Lucis.

1519

- Apokopos by Bergadis, the first book in Modern Greek, is printed in Venice.
- The chivalric romance Libro del muy esforzado e invencible caballero Don Claribalte (Book of the much striving and invincible knight Don Claribalte), the first work by Gonzalo Fernández de Oviedo y Valdés, is published in Valencia, Spain, by Juan Viñao. In a foreword dedicating it to Ferdinand, Duke of Calabria, Oviedo relates that it has been conceived and written in the Captaincy General of Santo Domingo (the Caribbean island of Hispaniola), where he has been working since 1514. It can therefore claim to be the first literary work created in the New World.

1521

- June 29 or 30 – Neacșu's letter is the oldest surviving dateable document written primarily in Romanian (using the Romanian Cyrillic alphabet).

1522

- Luo Guanzhong's 14th-century compilation Romance of the Three Kingdoms is first printed as Sanguozhi Tongsu Yanyi.
- Luther Bible: Martin Luther's translation of the New Testament into Early New High German from Greek, Das newe Testament Deutzsch, is published.

1522–24

- St Ignatius Loyola writes his Exercitia spiritualia (Spiritual Exercises), on which Jesuit spirituality is based. It is published in 1548 after formal approval by Pope Paul III.

1524

- Eyn Gespräch von dem gemaynen Schwabacher Kasten ("als durch Brüder Hainrich, Knecht Ruprecht, Kemerin, Spüler, und irem Maister, des Handtwercks der Wüllen Tuchmacher") is published in Germany, the first publication in the "Schwabacher" blackletter typeface.

1526

- Spring – The first complete printed translation of the New Testament into English by William Tyndale arrives in England from Germany, having been printed in Worms. In October, Cuthbert Tunstall, Bishop of London, attempts to collect all the copies in his diocese and burn them.
- The New Testament in Swedish, the first official Bible translation into Swedish, is made by Olaus Petri under royal patronage.
- The first complete Dutch-language translation of the Bible is printed by Jacob van Liesvelt in Antwerp.
- The Bibliotheca Corviniana in Ofen is destroyed by troops of the Ottoman Empire.

1530

- January – The first printed translation of the Torah in English, by William Tyndale, is published in Antwerp for distribution in Britain.
- An edition of Erasmus's Paraphrasis in Elegantiarum Libros Laurentii Vallae is the first book to use the Roman form of the Garamond typeface cut by Claude Garamond.
- Paracelsus finishes writing Paragranum.

1533

- October – The censors of the Collège de Sorbonne condemn François Rabelais' Pantagruel as obscene.

1534

- Luther Bible: Martin Luther's Biblia: das ist die gantze Heilige Schrifft Deudsch, a translation of the complete Bible into German, is printed by Hans Lufft in Wittenberg, with woodcut illustrations.
- Cambridge University Press is granted a royal charter by King Henry VIII of England to print "all manner of books" and so becomes the first of the privileged presses.
- Rabbi Asher Anchel's Mirkevet ha-Mishneh (a Tanakh concordance) is the first book printed in Yiddish (in Kraków).

1535

- The earliest printed book in Estonian, a Catechism with a translation by Johann Koell from the Middle Low German Lutheran text of Simon Wanradt, is printed by Hans Lufft in Wittenberg for use in Tallinn.

1536

- Petar Zoranić writes the first Croatian novel, the pastoral-allegorical Planine ("Mountains"); it first appears posthumously in Venice in 1569.

1537

- Construction of the Biblioteca Marciana in Venice to the design of Jacopo Sansovino begins, continuing to 1560.
- Paracelsus starts to write Astronomia Magna or the whole Philosophia Sagax of the Great and Little World.
- December 28 – Ordonnance de Montpellier initiates a legal deposit system for books in the Kingdom of France.

1538

- Paracelsus finishes writing Astronomia Magna or the whole Philosophia Sagax of the Great and Little World.
- December 20 – Pietro Bembo is made a Cardinal.

1539

- April – Printing of the Great Bible (The Byble in Englyshe) is completed. It is distributed to churches in England. Prepared by Myles Coverdale, it contains much material from the Tyndale Bible, unacknowledged as Tyndale's version is officially considered heretical.
- Game Place House in Great Yarmouth becomes the first English building to be used regularly as a public theatre.
- Marie Dentière writes an open letter to Marguerite of Navarre, sister of the King of France; the Epistre tres utile (Very useful letter) calls for expulsion of Catholic clergy from France.
- The first printing press in North America is set up in Mexico City. Its first known book, Manual de Adultos, appears in 1540.

1540

- Sir David Lyndsay's Middle Scots satirical morality play A Satire of the Three Estates is first performed, privately.

1541

- Elia Levita's chivalric romance, the Bovo-Bukh, is first printed, becoming the earliest published secular work in Yiddish.

1542

- La relación/The Account, written by Álvar Núñez Cabeza de Vaca, appears, as the first European publication devoted wholly to discussion of North America.

1550

- Primož Trubar's Catechismus and Abecedarium, the first books in Slovene, are printed in Schwäbisch Hall.
- Popol Vuh is written after a long oral tradition.

1551

- An edition of the Book of Common Prayer becomes the first book printed in Ireland.

1552

- June – Sir David Lyndsay's Middle Scots satirical morality play A Satire of the Three Estates is first performed publicly in full, at Cupar in Fife.

1554

- Publication of Menno Simons' Uytgangh ofte bekeeringhe begins the Dutch Golden Age of literature.

1565

- Torquato Tasso enters the service of Cardinal Luigi d'Este at Ferrara.

1567

- October 14 – António Ferreira becomes Desembargador da Casa do Civel and leaves Coimbra for Lisbon.
- Approximate date – The first publication in book form of the Chinese shenmo fantasy novel Fengshen Yanyi.

1571

- October 7 – In the naval Battle of Lepanto, Miguel de Cervantes is wounded.
- Michel de Montaigne retires from public life and isolates himself in the tower of the Château de Montaigne.

1572

- England's Vagabonds Act 1572 prescribes punishment for rogues. This includes acting companies lacking formal patronage.
- Luís Vaz de Camões of Portugal publishes his epic Os Lusíadas.

1575

- September 26 – Miguel de Cervantes is captured by Barbary pirates, to be ransomed only five years later.
- Sir Philip Sidney meets Penelope Devereux, the inspiration for his Astrophel and Stella.

1576

- December – James Burbage builds The Theatre, London's first permanent public playhouse. This opens the great age of English Renaissance theatre.

1586

- October 17 – The poet Sir Philip Sidney (born 1554) dies of wounds received at the Battle of Zutphen.

1590

- A troupe of boy actors, the Children of Paul's, is suppressed due to its playwright John Lyly's role in the Marprelate controversy.

1596

- Blackfriars Theatre opens in London.

1597

- Ben Jonson is briefly jailed in Marshalsea Prison after his play The Isle of Dogs is suppressed.

1598

- September 22 – Ben Jonson kills actor Gabriel Spenser in a duel, but is only held briefly in Newgate Prison.
- December 28 – The Theatre in London is dismantled .
- Thomas Bodley refounds the Bodleian Library at the University of Oxford.

1599

- Spring/Summer – The Globe Theatre built in Southwark, London, utilises material from The Theatre.
- June 4 – Bishops' Ban of 1599: Thomas Middleton's Microcynicon: Six Snarling Satires and John Marston's Scourge of Villainy are publicly burned as the English ecclesiastical authorities clamp down on published satire.
- Late – The War of the Theatres, a satirical controversy, breaks out on the London stage.

== New books ==
1500

- This is the Boke of Cokery, the first known printed cookbook in English
- Desiderius Erasmus – Collectanea Adagiorum (1st ed., Paris)
- Singiraja – Maha Basavaraja Charitra

1501

- Desiderius Erasmus – Handbook of a Christian Knight (Enchiridion militis Christiani)
- Margery Kempe – The Book of Margery Kempe (posthumous)
- Marko Marulić – Judita (written)

1502

- Shin Maha Thilawuntha – Yazawin Kyaw

1503

- William Dunbar – The Thrissil and the Rois
- Euripides – Tragoediae
- Approximate date: "Robin Hood and the Potter" (ballad)

1505

- Georges Chastellain – Récollections des merveilles advenues en mon temps (posthumous)
- Stephen Hawes
  - The Passtyme of Pleasure
  - The Temple of Glass
- Lodovico Lazzarelli – Crater Hermetics (posthumous)
- Pierre Le Baud – Cronique des roys et princes de Bretaigne armoricane (completed)

1508

- William Dunbar – The Goldyn Targe
- Erasmus of Rotterdam – Adagiorum chiliades (2nd ed., Venice)
- Johannes Trithemius – De septem secundeis

1509

- Manjarasa – Samyukta Koumudi

1510

- Garci Rodríguez de Montalvo – Las sergas de Esplandián
- Ruiz Paez de Ribera – Florisando

1511

- The Demaũdes Joyous (joke book published by Wynkyn de Worde in English)
- Erasmus – The Praise of Folly

1512

- Henry Medwall – Fulgens and Lucrece
- Huldrych Zwingli – De Gestis inter Gallos et Helvetios relatio
- Il-yeon - The Samguk Yusa

1513

- Mallanarya of Gubbi – Bhava Chintaratna
- First translation of Virgil's Aeneid into English (Scots dialect) by Gavin Douglas

1514–15

- Gian Giorgio Trissino – Sofonisba

1516

- Henry Cornelius Agrippa
  - Dialogus de homine (Casale)
  - De triplici ratione cognoscendi Deum
- Erasmus – Novum Instrumentum omne (Greek New Testament translation)
- Robert Fabyan (anonymous; died c. 1512) – The New Chronicles of England and France
- Marsilio Ficino – De triplici vita
- Thomas More – Utopia

1517

- Francysk Skaryna's Bible translation and printing
- Teofilo Folengo's Baldo, a popular Italian work of comedy

1518

- Henry Cornelius Agrippa – De originali peccato
- Erasmus – Colloquies
- Tantrakhyan (Nepal Bhasa literature)

1519

- Santikirti – Santinatha Purana

1520

- Scholars at Complutense University, Alcalá de Henares, under the direction of Diego Lopez de Zúñiga – Complutensian Polyglot Bible

1521

- Goražde Psalter

1522

- Luo Guanzhong (attrib.) – Romance of the Three Kingdoms; first publication
- Martin Luther – Das newe Testament Deutzsch, translation of the New Testament into German

1523

- Jacques Lefèvre d'Étaples – Nouveau Testament, translation of the New Testament into French
- Martin Luther – Das allte Testament Deutsch, translation of the Pentateuch into German
- Maximilianus Transylvanus – De Moluccis Insulis, the first published account of the Magellan–Elcano circumnavigation

1524

- Philippe de Commines – Mémoires (Part 1: Books 1–6); first publication (Paris)
- Martin Luther and Paul Speratus – Etlich Cristlich Lider: Lobgesang un Psalm ("Achtliederbuch"), the first Lutheran hymnal (Wittenberg)
- Martin Luther and others – Eyn Enchiridion oder Handbüchlein (the "Erfurt Enchiridion"), two editions of a hymnal printed respectively by Johannes Loersfeld and Matthes Maler (Erfurt)
- Johann Walter – Eyn geystlich Gesangk Buchleyn ("A sacred little hymnal") (Wittenberg)

1525

- Pietro Bembo – Prose della volgar lingua
- Francesco Giorgi – De harmonia mundi totius
- Paracelsus – De septem puncti idolotriae christianae
- Antonio Pigafetta – Relazione del primo viaggio intorno al mondo ("Report on the First Voyage Around the World"); partial publication (Paris)

1526

- William Tyndale's New Testament Bible translation

1527

- Hector Boece – Historia Scotorum
- Philippe de Commines – Mémoires (Part 2: Books 7–8); first publication
- Hans Sachs and Andreas Osiander – Eyn wunderliche Weyssagung von dem Babsttumb, wie es ihm biz an das endt der welt gehen sol ("A wonderful prophecy of the papacy about how things will go for it up until the end of the world")

1528

- Baltissare Castiglione – The Book of the Courtier (Il Cortegiano)
- Jacques Lefèvre d'Étaples – Ancien Testament, translation of the Old Testament into French
- Francisco Delicado – Portrait of Lozana: The Lusty Andalusian Woman (Retrato de la Loçana andaluza)
- William Tyndale – The Obedience of a Christian Man

1530

- William Tyndale – The Practice of Prelates

1531

- Henry Cornelius Agrippa – De occulta philosophia libri tres, Book One
- Andrea Alciato – Emblemata
- Sir Thomas Elyot – The Boke Named the Governour, the first English work concerning moral philosophy
- Niccolò Machiavelli (posthumous) – Discourses on Livy
- Paracelsus – Opus Paramirum (written in St. Gallen)
- Michael Servetus – De trinitatis erroribus ("On the Errors of the Trinity")

1532

- Niccolò Machiavelli (posthumous) – The Prince
- François Rabelais (as Alcofribas Nasier) – Pantagruel (Les horribles et épouvantables faits et prouesses du très renommé Pantagruel Roi des Dipsodes, fils du Grand Géant Gargantua)
- Feliciano de Silva – Don Florisel de Niquea

1533

- Henry Cornelius Agrippa – Books Two and Three of De occulta philosophia libri tres
- Antoine Marcourt (as Pantople) – Le livre des marchans

1534

- Asher Anchel – Mirkevet ha-Mishneh
- Martin Luther (translator) – "Luther Bible" (Biblia)
- François Rabelais (as Alcofribas Nasier) – Gargantua (La vie très horrifique du grand Gargantua, père de Pantagruel)
- Polydore Vergil – Historia Anglica

1535

- John Bourchier, 2nd Baron Berners – Huon of Bordeaux
- Simon Wanradt and Johann Koell – Catechism
- Bible d'Olivétan (first translation of the complete Bible made from the original Hebrew and Greek into French)

1536

- John Calvin – Institutes of the Christian Religion (in Latin)
- Sir Thomas Elyot – The Castel of Helth
- Paracelsus – Die große Wundarzney

1538

- Hélisenne de Crenne – Les Angoisses douloureuses qui procèdent d'amours
- Sir Thomas Elyot – The dictionary of syr Thomas Eliot knyght (Latin to English)

1539

- Robert Estienne – Alphabetum Hebraicum

1540

- Historia Scotorum of Hector Boece, translated into vernacular Scots by John Bellenden at the special request of James V of Scotland
- The Byrth of Mankynde, the first printed book in English on obstetrics, and one of the first published in England to include engraved plates

1541

- George Buchanan
  - Baptistes
  - Jephtha
- Joachim Sterck van Ringelbergh – Lucubrationes vel potius absolutissima kyklopaideia

1542

- Paul Fagius – Liber Fidei seu Veritatis
- Edward Hall – The Union of the Two Noble and Illustrate Famelies of Lancastre & Yorke

1543

- Nicolaus Copernicus – De revolutionibus orbium coelestium (On the Revolution of the Heavenly Spheres)
- Andreas Vesalius – De humani corporis fabrica libri septem (On the Fabric of the Human body in Seven Books)

1544

- Cardinal John Fisher – Psalmi seu precationes (posthumous) in an anonymous English translation by its sponsor, Queen Katherine Parr
- John Leland – Assertio inclytissimi Arturii regis Britanniae

1545

- Roger Ascham – Toxophilus
- Bernard Etxepare – Linguae Vasconum Primitiae
- Sir John Fortescue – De laudibus legum Angliae (written c. 1471)
- Queen Katherine Parr – Prayers or Meditations, the first book published by an English queen under her own name

1546

- Sir John Prise of Brecon – Yn y lhyvyr hwnn (first book in Welsh; anonymous)
- François Rabelais – Le tiers livre

1547

- Gruffudd Hiraethog – Oll synnwyr pen Kembero ygyd (posthumous collection of Welsh proverbs made by William Salesbury)
- Martynas Mažvydas – The Simple Words of Catechism (first printed book in Lithuanian)
- Queen Katherine Parr – The Lamentation of a Sinner
- William Salesbury – A Dictionary in Englyshe and Welshe

1548

- John Bale – Illustrium majoris Britanniae scriptorum, hoc est, Angliae, Cambriae, ac Scotiae Summarium... ("A Summary of the Famous Writers of Great Britain, that is, of England, Wales and Scotland"; 1548–9)

1549

- Johannes Aal – Johannes der Täufer (St. John Baptist)
- The Complaynt of Scotland

1550

- Martin Bucer – De regno Christi
- The Facetious Nights of Straparola published in Italian, the first European storybook to contain fairy-tales

1552

- François Rabelais – Le quart livre
- Gerónimo de Santa Fe – Hebræomastix (posthumous)
- Libellus de Medicinalibus Indorum Herbis (Little Book of the Medicinal Herbs of the Indians), composed in Nahuatl by Martín de la Cruz and translated into Latin by Juan Badiano.

1553

- Francesco Patrizi – La Città felice ("The Happy City")

1554

- Anonymous – Lazarillo de Tormes

1559

- The Elizabethan version of the Book of Common Prayer of the Church of England, which remains in use until the mid-17th century and becomes the first English Prayer Book in America
- Jorge de Montemayor – Diana
- Pavao Skalić – Encyclopediae seu orbis disciplinarum tam sacrarum quam profanarum epistemon

1560

- Jacques Grévin – Jules César
- William Whittingham, Anthony Gilby, Thomas Sampson – Geneva Bible

1562

- William Bullein – Bullein's Bulwarke of Defence againste all Sicknes, Sornes, and Woundes

1563

- John Foxe – Foxe's Book of Martyrs

1564

- John Dee – Monas Hieroglyphica

1565

- Camillo Porzio – La Congiura dei baroni

1567

- Joan Perez de Lazarraga – Silbero, Silbia, Doristeo, and Sirena (MS in Basque)
- Magdeburg Centuries, vols X-XI
- William Salesbury – Testament Newydd ein Arglwydd Iesu Christ (translation of New Testament into Welsh)
- Séon Carsuel, Bishop of the Isles – Foirm na n-Urrnuidheadh (translation of Knox's Book of Common Order into Classical Gaelic)

1569

- Alonso de Ercilla y Zúñiga – La Araucana, part 1
- Petar Zoranić – Planine

1571

- François de Belleforest – La Pyrénée (or La Pastorale amoureuse), the first French "pastoral novel"
- Aibidil Gaoidheilge agus Caiticiosma (first printing in Irish)

1572

- Friedrich Risner – Opticae thesaurus
- Turba Philosophorum

1560–1575

- Dawlat Wazir Bahram Khan – Laily-Majnu in Bengali

1576

- Jean Boudin – Six livres de la République
- George Pettie – A Petite Palace of Pettie His Pleasure
- The Paradise of Dainty Devices, the most popular of the Elizabethan verse miscellanies

1577

- Richard Eden – The History of Travayle in the West and East Indies
- Thomas Hill – The Gardener's Labyrinth
- Raphael Holinshed – The Chronicles of England, Scotland and Irelande

1578

- George Best – A True Discourse of the Late Voyages of Discoverie...under the Conduct of Martin Frobisher
- John Florio – First Fruits
- Jaroš Griemiller – Rosarium philosophorum
- Gabriel Harvey – Smithus, vel Musarum lachrymae
- John Lyly – Euphues: the Anatomy of Wit

1579

- Stephen Gosson – The Schoole of Abuse
- Thomas Lodge – Honest Excuses

1581

- Barnabe Riche – Riche his Farewell to Militarie Profession conteining verie pleasaunt discourses fit for a peaceable tyme

1582

- George Buchanan – Rerum Scoticarum Historia
- Richard Hakluyt – Divers Voyages
- John Leland – A learned and true assertion of the original, life, actes, and death of the most noble, valiant, and renoumed Prince Arthure, King of great Brittaine (posthumous translation)

1583

- Philip Stubbes – The Anatomy of Abuses

1584

- James VI of Scotland – Some Reulis and Cautelis
- David Powel – Historie of Cambria
- Reginald Scot – The Discovery of Witchcraft

1585

- Miguel de Cervantes – La Galatea
- William Davies – Y Drych Cristianogawl

1586

- John Knox – Historie of the Reformatioun of Religioun within the Realms of Scotland
- John Lyly – Pappe with an hatchet, alias a figge for my Godsonne
- George Puttenham (attr.) – The Arte of English Poesie

1588

- Thomas Hariot – A Briefe and True Report of the New Found Land of Virginia
- Thomas Nashe – The Anatomie of Absurditie

1590

- Thomas Lodge – Rosalynde: Euphues Golden Legacie
- Thomas Nashe – An Almond for a Parrat

1592

- Robert Greene – Greene's Groatsworth of Wit
- Gabriel Harvey – Foure Letters and certaine Sonnets
- Richard Johnson – Nine Worthies of London

1594

- Sir John Davis – The Seamans Secrets
- Richard Hooker – Of the Lawes of Ecclesiastical Politie

1595

- Sir Philip Sidney (posthumous) – An Apology for Poetry (written c. 1579)

1596

- Sir Walter Raleigh – The Discoverie of the Large, Rich and Beautiful Empyre of Guiana

1597

- Francis Bacon – Essays

1598

- John Bodenham – Politeuphuia (Wits' Commonwealth)
- King James VI of Scotland – The Trew Law of Free Monarchies
- Francis Meres – Palladis Tamia, Wits Treasury
- John Stow – Survey of London

1599

- John Bodenham – Wits' Theater

== New drama ==
1502

- The Monologue of the Cowboy

1504

- Beunans Meriasek (Cornish)

1508

- Ludovico Ariosto – Cassaria
- The World and the Child, also known as Mundas et Infans (probable date of composition)

1509

- Ludovico Ariosto – I suppositi

1513

- Juan del Encina – Plácida y Victoriano

1517

- A Trilogia das Barcas

1522

- Niklaus Manuel Deutsch I – Vom Papst und Christi Gegensatz

1523

- Farsa de Inês Pereira

1524

- Niklaus Manuel Deutsch I – Vom Papst und seiner Priesterschaft

1525

- Niklaus Manuel Deutsch I – Der Ablasskrämer

1531

- Accademia degli Intronati – Gl' Ingannati

1536

- Hans Ackermann – Der Verlorene Sohn

1538

- John Bale
  - Kynge Johan, the earliest known English historical drama (in verse)
  - Three Laws of Nature, Moses and Christ, corrupted by the Sodomytes, Pharisees and Papystes most wicked

1541

- Giovanni Battista Giraldi – Orbecche

1551

- Marin Držić – Dundo Maroje

1553

- (about 1553) – Gammer Gurton's Needle and Ralph Roister Doister, the first comedies written in English
- António Ferreira – Bristo

1562

- Thomas Norton and Thomas Sackville – Gorboduc
- Jack Juggler – anonymous, sometimes attributed to Nicholas Udall

1566

- George Gascoigne – Supposes

1567

- John Pickering – Horestes

1568

- Ulpian Fulwell – Like Will to Like

1573

- Torquato Tasso – Aminta

1582

- Giovanni Battista Guarini – Il pastor fido

1584

- John Lyly
  - Campaspe
  - Sapho and Phao
- George Peele – The Arraignment of Paris
- Robert Wilson – The Three Ladies of London (published)

1588

- George Peele – The Battle of Alcazar (performed)

1589

- The Rare Triumphs of Love and Fortune – anonymous (published)

1590

- Christopher Marlowe – Tamburlaine (both parts published)
- George Peele – Famous Chronicle of King Edward the First
- Robert Wilson – The Three Lords and Three Ladies of London (published)

1591

- John Lyly – Endymion (published)
- The Troublesome Reign of King John – Anonymous (published)

1592

- Thomas Kyd – The Spanish Tragedy (published)
- William Shakespeare – Henry VI, Part 1, Part 2, Part 3
- Arden of Faversham – anonymous (previously attributed to Shakespeare)

1594

- Samuel Daniel – Cleopatra
- Robert Greene
  - Friar Bacon and Friar Bungay (published)
  - Orlando Furioso (published)
- Thomas Lodge & Robert Greene – A Looking Glass for London (published)
- Lope de Vega – El maestro de danzar ("The Dancing Master")
- George Peele – The Battle of Alcazar (published)
- William Shakespeare – Romeo and Juliet
- Robert Wilson – The Cobbler's Prophecy (published)

1595

- Anonymous – Locrine (published)

1597

- Thomas Nashe and Ben Jonson – The Isle of Dogs
- William Shakespeare – Richard II (published)

1598

- Robert Greene – The Scottish Historie of James the Fourth (published)
- Ben Jonson – Every Man in His Humour

1599

- Thomas Dekker – The Shoemaker's Holiday
- Thomas Dekker, Henry Chettle, and William Haughton – Patient Grissel
- Ben Jonson – Every Man Out of His Humour
- William Shakespeare – Henry V

== New poetry ==
1505

- Pietro Bembo – Gli Asolani

1514

- Francesco Maria Molzo – Translation of the Aeneid into Italian, in consecutive unrhymed verse (forerunner of blank verse)

1516

- Ludovico Ariosto – Orlando Furioso (first version, April)

1527

- Pietro Aretino – Sonetti Lussuriosi ("Sonnets of lust" or "Aretino's Postures", to accompany an edition of Raimondi's erotic engravings, I Modi)

1528

- Anna Bijns – Refrains

1530

- Pietro Bembo – Rime

By 1534

- "A Gest of Robyn Hode"

1550

- Sir Thomas Wyatt – Pentential Psalms

1557

- Giovanni Battista Giraldi – Ercole
- Tottel's Miscellany

1562

- Arthur Brooke – The Tragical History of Romeus and Juliet
- Torquato Tasso – Rinaldo

1563

- Barnabe Googe – Eclogues, Epitaphs, and Sonnets

1567

- George Turberville – Epitaphs, Epigrams, Songs and Sonnets

1572

- Luís de Camões – Os Lusíadas

1573

- George Gascoigne – A Hundred Sundry Flowers

1575

- Nicholas Breton – A Small Handful of Fragrant Flowers
- George Gascoigne – The Posies

1576

- The Paradise of Dainty Devices, the most popular of the Elizabethan verse miscellanies

1577

- Nicholas Breton – The Works of a Young Wit and A Flourish upon Fancy

1579

- Edmund Spenser – The Shepherd's Calendar

1581

- Torquato Tasso – Jerusalem Delivered
- Thomas Watson – Hekatompathia or Passionate Century of Love

1586

- Luis Barahona de Soto – Primera parte de la Angélica

1590

- Sir Philip Sidney – Arcadia
- Edmund Spenser – The Faerie Queene, Books 1–3

1591

- Sir Philip Sidney – Astrophel and Stella (published posthumously)

1592

- Henry Constable – Diana

1593

- Michael Drayton – The Shepherd's Garland
- Giles Fletcher, the Elder – Licia

1594

- Michael Drayton – Peirs Gaveston

1595

- Thomas Campion – Poemata

1596

- Sir John Davies – Orchestra, or a Poeme of Dauncing
- Michael Drayton – The Civell Warres of Edward the Second and the Barrons
- Edmund Spenser – The Faerie Queene, Books 1–6

1597

- Michael Drayton – Englands Heroicall Epistles

1598

- Lope de Vega
  - La Arcadia
  - La Dragontea

1599

- Sir John Davies
  - Hymnes of Astraea
  - Nosce Teipsum
- George Peele – The Love of King David and Faire Bethsabe

== Births ==
- c. 1501 – Garcilaso de la Vega, Spanish soldier and poet (died 1536)
- 1503 – Thomas Wyatt
- 1504 – Nicholas Udall (died 1556)
- 1508 – Primož Trubar, author of the first printed books in Slovene (died 1586)
- 1510 – Martynas Mažvydas
- 1511 – Johannes Secundus (died 1535)
- 1513 – Daniele Barbaro (died 1570)
- 1515 – Roger Ascham
- 1515 – Johann Weyer, Dutch occultist (died 1588)
- 1517 – Henry Howard
- c. 1520 – Christophe Plantin, printer (died 1589)
- 1524 – Luís de Camões (died 1580)
- 1547 – Miguel de Cervantes (died 1616)
- 1551 – William Camden
- 1554 – Philip Sidney
- 1555 – Lancelot Andrewes
- 1558 – Robert Greene
- 1558 – Thomas Kyd
- 1561 – Luís de Góngora y Argote, Spanish poet (died 1627)
- 1562 – Lope de Vega, Spanish poet and dramatist (died 1635)
- 1564 – Henry Chettle, English dramatist (died 1607)
- 1564 – Christopher Marlowe, English poet and dramatist (died 1593)
- 1564 – William Shakespeare, English poet and dramatist (died 1616)
- 1570 – Robert Aytoun
- 1572 – Ben Jonson, John Donne
- 1576 – John Marston
- 1577 – Robert Burton
- 1580 – Francisco de Quevedo (died 1645)
- 1581 – Pieter Corneliszoon Hooft
- 1583 – Philip Massinger
- 1587 – Joost van den Vondel
- 1594 – James Howell

== Deaths ==
- 1502
  - Felix Fabri (Felix Faber), Swiss Dominican theologian and travel writer (born c. 1441)
  - Henry Medwall, English dramatist (born c. 1462)
- 1513 – Robert Fabyan, English chronicler and sheriff (year of birth unknown)
- 1515 – Aldus Manutius, Italian publisher (born 1449)
- 1527 – Ludovico Vicentino degli Arrighi, Italian calligrapher and type designer (born 1475)
- 1534 – Wynkyn de Worde, Lotharingian-born English printer
- 1536 – Johannes Secundus, Dutch poet writing in Latin (born 1511)
- 1542 – Thomas Wyatt, English poet (born 1503)
- 1546 – Meera, Indian poet and mystic (born 1498)
- 1552 – Alexander Barclay, English or Scottish poet (born c. 1476)
- 1553
  - Hanibal Lucić, Croatian poet and playwright (born c. 1485)
  - François Rabelais, French writer and polymath (year of birth unknown)
- 1555 – Polydore Vergil (Polydorus Vergilius), Italian scholar (born c. 1470)
- 1563
  - John Bale, English historian, controversialist and bishop (born 1495)
  - Martynas Mažvydas, Lithuanian religious writer (born 1510)
- 1566 – Marco Girolamo Vida, Italian poet (born 1485?)
- 30 December 1568 – Roger Ascham, English scholar and didact (born 1515)
- 1570 – Daniele Barbaro, Italian writer, translator and cardinal (born 1513)
- 1577 – George Gascoigne, English poet and soldier (born c. 1535)
- 1580 or 1582 – Wu Cheng'en, Chinese writer (born c. 1500)
- 1584 – Jan Kochanowski, Polish poet (born 1530)
- 1585 – Pierre de Ronsard, French poet (born 1524)
- 1586 – Primož Trubar, Slovene author (born 1508)
- 1588 – Johann Weyer, Dutch occultist (born 1515)
- 1 July 1589 – Christophe Plantin, Dutch humanist and printer (born c. 1520)
- 3 September 1592 – Robert Greene, English dramatist (born 1558)
- 30 May 1593 – Christopher Marlowe, English dramatist, poet and translator (born 1564)
- 15 August 1594 (burial) – Thomas Kyd, English dramatist (born 1558)
- 5 November 1595 – Luis Barahona de Soto, Spanish poet (born 1548)

== In literature ==
- The main action of Peter Shaffer's drama The Royal Hunt of the Sun (1964) is set in 1532–33.

== See also ==
- 16th century in poetry
- 15th century in literature
- 17th century in literature
- List of years in literature
- Early Modern literature
- Renaissance literature
