= 1586 in literature =

This article contains information about the literary events and publications of 1586.

== Events ==
- September 19 – The English poet Chidiock Tichborne, imprisoned in the Tower of London on the eve of being hanged, drawn and quartered for his part in the Babington Plot, writes his Elegy ("My prime of youth is but a frost of cares").
- September 22 – The English poet, critic, courtier and soldier Sir Philip Sidney is fatally wounded at the Battle of Zutphen.
- unknown dates
  - Francis Bacon takes a new seat as MP in the Parliament of England, that of Taunton.
  - Oxford University Press is recognised in a decree of the Star Chamber in England.

== New books ==
=== Prose ===
- Caesar Baronius – Roman martyrology (new edition)
- Timothie Bright - A Treatise of Melancholie
- William Camden – Britannia (in Latin)
- Dirck Volckertszoon Coornhert – Zedekunst (Art of Ethics)
- Angel Day – The English Secretary
- Robert Greene – Morando, the Tritameron of Love (part 2)
- John Knox – Historie of the Reformatioun of Religioun within the Realms of Scotland
- John Lyly – Pappe with an hatchet, alias a figge for my Godsonne
- Jerónimo Osório – De rebus Emmanuelis
- George Puttenham (attributed) – The Arte of English Poesie
- Luis Barahona de Soto – Primera parte de la Angélica
- George Whetstone – English Myrror

=== Drama ===
- Anonymous – Locrine (estimated year of writing)
- Miguel de Cervantes (attributed) – La conquista de Jerusalén por Godofre de Bullón (first recorded performance)
- Christopher Marlowe and Thomas Nashe – Dido, Queen of Carthage (estimated year of writing)

=== Poetry ===
- Luis Barahona de Soto – Primera parte de la Angélica
- William Warner – Albion's England

See also 1586 in poetry

== Births ==
- April 12 (bapt.) – John Ford, English dramatist (died c. 1639)
- Unknown dates
  - Antony Hickey, Irish Franciscan theologian (died 1641)
  - Francisco de Moncada, Spanish diplomat, soldier and historian (died 1635)
  - Lady Mary Wroth, English poet (died c. 1651)

== Deaths ==
- March 20 – Richard Maitland, Scottish statesman and historian (born 1496)
- April 8 – Martin Chemnitz, German Lutheran theologian (born 1522)
- June 1 – Martín de Azpilcueta, Spanish theologian (born 1491)
- June 28 – Primož Trubar, author of first printed book in Slovene (born 1508)
- August 1 – Richard Maitland, Scottish poet (born 1496)
- September 20 – Chidiock Tichborne, English poet and conspirator (executed, born 1558)
- October 17 – Sir Philip Sidney, English poet and critic (of wounds, born 1554)
- Unknown dates
  - Antonio Agustín y Albanell, Spanish historian (born 1516)
  - Birbal, Indian poet and wit (born 1528)
  - Giulio Cesare Brancaccio, Italian writer and entertainer (born 1515)
  - Sur (Surdas), Hindu devotional poet (born between 1478 and 1483)
