= Reddish House =

House in the village of Broad Chalke in Wiltshire

Coordinates: 51.0268°N 1.9464°W

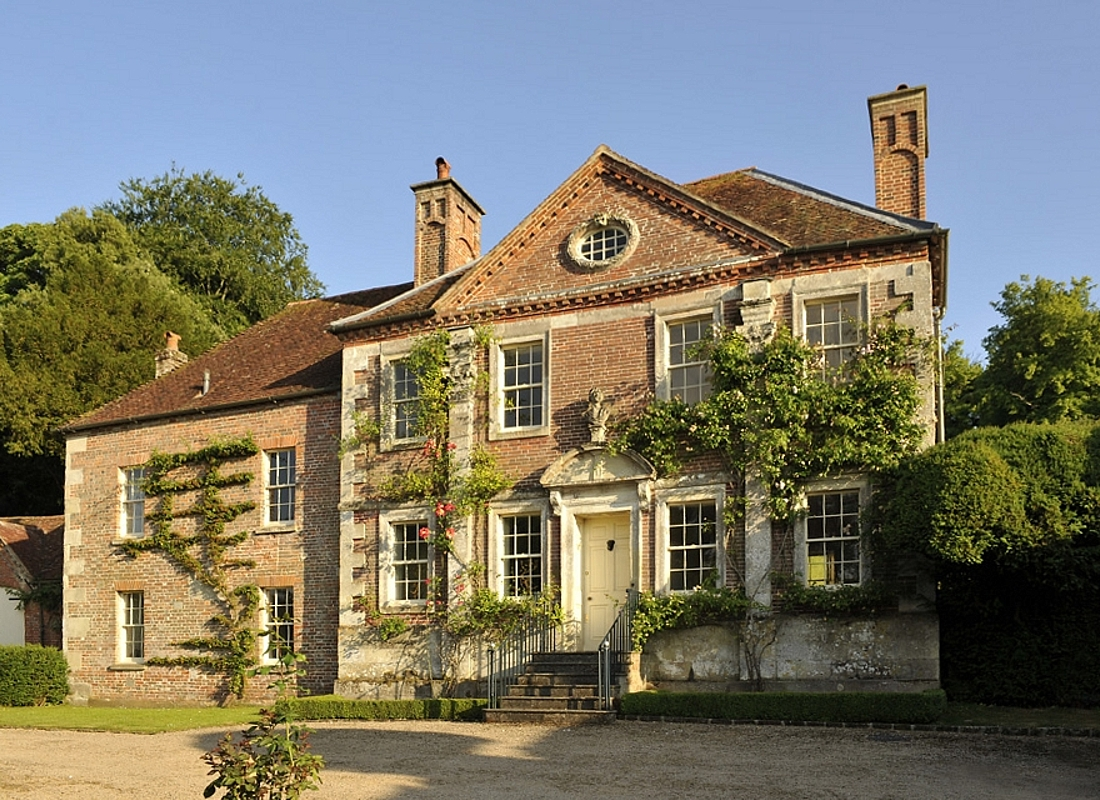
Front view of Reddish House in Wiltshire

Reddish House, also known as Reddish Manor, is an early 18th-century manor house in the village of Broad Chalke in Wiltshire, England. It was possibly built in its current form for Jeremiah Cray, a clothier. It is a Grade II listed building.

Whilst the history of the property can be traced to the early 16th century, the house as it currently stands appears to have been developed in the early 18th century, when owned by a series of three absentee landlords all sharing the name Jeremiah Cray. The construction and design appear to show a mélange of influences of the architectural styles favoured during the reigns of Charles II (1660–1685); William III and Mary II (1689–1702); and Queen Anne (1702–1714).

== Chronology ==
=== 16th century ===
In the early 16th century, Littlecote farm was bought from John Littlecote by Sir Richard Elyot, serjeant-at-law and Attorney-General to the Queen consort, Elizabeth of York. After his death in 1522 it passed to his only son, Thomas Elyot a diplomat and author. The 50 acre farm was taken by the crown at the Dissolution of the Monasteries, and it is surmised that this was because Sir Thomas Elyot had included it in an endowment to Salisbury Cathedral. In 1560 Queen Elizabeth I granted it to William Reddiche who already owned several properties in the village as a 'Free tenant' of the Earl of Pembroke in Wilton.

William Reddiche of Maiden Bradley was married to Alice Dyer, daughter of Sir James Dyer, a judge and Speaker of the House of Commons.

During the Dissolution period (circa 1530s) the farm appears to have been leased by John Penny. He died in 1555 bequeathing to his son the 80 sheep, grazing rights, sown crops and farm equipment.

=== 17th century ===
The Reddish/Reddiche family owned the estate from 1560 until 1696 but as they lived in Maiden Bradley it was inhabited by a series of lessees. These appear to include the descendants of John Penny because in 1630 a new lease was granted to a John Penny.

The absentee Reddish family who owned the house and farm included Christopher Reddish (circa 1599); Edward Reddish (circa 1628); his sons William Reddish (circa 1662) and James Reddish who sold it in 1696 to Jeremiah Cray. Of Ibsley, Hampshire, Cray was another absentee landlord who owned several estates including Cray's Farm at Verwood.

=== 18th century ===
Jeremiah Cray died in 1709 (or 1710) bequeathing most of his estates to either his brother Alexander or his nephew John Cray. In 1725 John Cray passed it to his own son Jeremiah who died in 1731 and whose own son, another Jeremiah Cray (the third Jeremiah) died in 1786. During the Cray ownership Reddish had been inhabited and farmed by a series of lessees including a mercer John Coombs from 1702 to 1706, and George Northover for over 50 years and James Lawes.

In 1786 Jeremiah Cray's estates were shared by his two daughters, Sarah and Margaret, wives of Sir Alexander Grant, 7th Baronet and Percival Lewis respectively.

=== 19th century ===
Records indicate that a large service wing extended from the east side of the Baroque wing in the early 1800s but no physical evidence exists.

In 1806 the house was sold to George Young from Horton in Dorset who became the first resident owner for 246 years. It was probably during his ownership that the service wing was removed and a Drawing Room added as part of the alterations completed at his behest. Young bequeathed the property to his son George Bland Young in 1828; the coach house was probably constructed during his ownership, before 1886. It was then bequeathed to George Edgar Young in 1893.

=== 20th century ===
The house was inhabited by Norah Young until 1918, and by Major C.A. Wells until 1929 when it was purchased by R.W. Williamson to amalgamate the 100 acres into the neighbouring Knowle farm. In 1935 Claude Williamson sold the house and its 2.5 acre gardens to Dr. Lucius Wood and his wife Clara who lived there from 1935 until 1947, running his General Practice and dentistry. Their son, the artist Christopher Wood, is buried with them in the village churchyard; his headstone was carved by Eric Gill.

After losing the tenancy of his beloved Ashcombe House, society photographer and artist Sir Cecil Beaton bought nearby Reddish House in 1947 and transformed the interior. Beaton added rooms on the eastern side, extended the parlour southwards, and introduced many new fittings. Greta Garbo was a visitor. The upper floor had been equipped for illegal cock-fighting at the beginning of the 20th century; Beaton used the cages as wardrobes to store the costumes for his play "The Gainsborough Girls". The water garden he created in 1971 in the meadow at the front of the house, with meandering walks, is still in place. Beaton also added the indoor "Winter Garden" with a glass dome roof and a small pool in the marble floor. A historic research report by Adam Architecture is less complimentary about some other changes made during his tenure: "Beaton removed some important historic features within the house such as original partitioning and several fireplaces, and hid elements such as timber framing". He remained at the house until his death in 1980 and is buried in the churchyard.

The house was Grade II listed in March 1960, originally as Reddish Manor and stables; the listing was updated in December 1986. The list entry does not discuss the modifications made by Beaton and simply states that "it is probable that some of the interior was remodelled by Cecil Beaton".

In 1980, Ursula Henderson bought the house from the estate of Cecil Beaton and lived there until 1987, when she moved to the neighbouring village of Bishopstone. She was born Ursula von Pannwitz and was once styled Countess of Chichester from her first marriage to John Pelham, 8th Earl of Chichester who died on active service in 1944. While living at Reddish House, Henderson kept macaws which flew noisily and freely around the village, stripping bark from trees.

The house was owned and extensively renovated by musician Robert Fripp and his wife Toyah Willcox from December 1987 until July 1999.

=== 21st century ===
Reports since that time do not specify the owners of the property, but a June 2017 architects' document states that "further additions and alterations were made ... most recently, in 2006. Articles published after the listing of the property for sale in 2020 discuss upgrades such as a "red brick and clay tile roof exterior opens into a ... reception hall with fireplace and ... Italian marble columns", a sitting room on the ground floor, an improved kitchen with modern appliances, and a carriage room. Two cottages in the grounds were also renovated.
