= The Book of the Governor =

1531 book by Thomas Elyot

The Boke named the Governour, sometimes referred to in modern English as The Book of the Governor, is a book written by Thomas Elyot and published in 1531. It was dedicated to Henry VIII and is largely a treatise on how to properly train statesmen. It also discusses ethical dilemmas in the education system of the time. The Book of the Governor is evidence of the impact that Renaissance humanism had on prose writing.

== Thomas Elyot ==
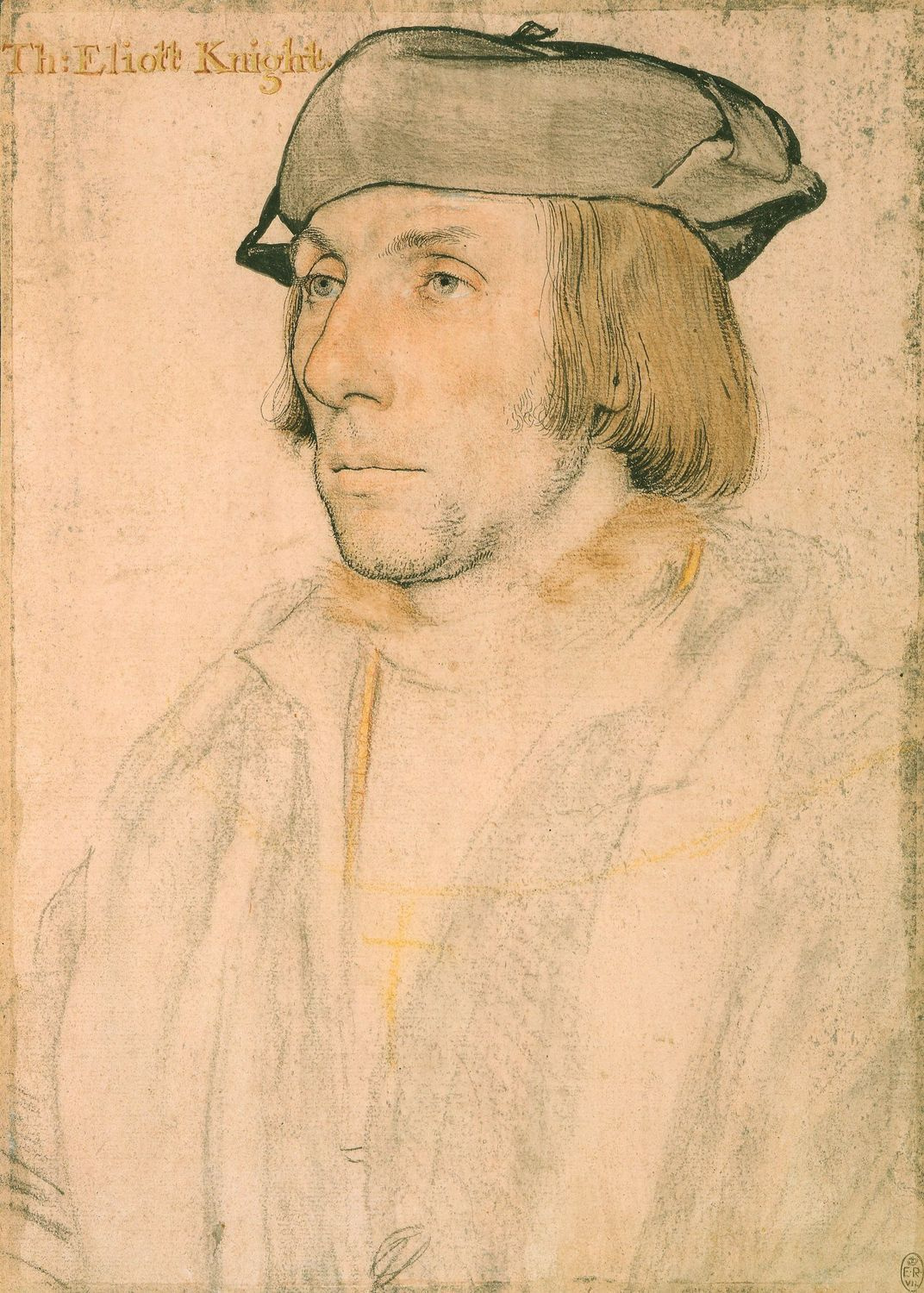
Holbein Sir Thomas Elyot

Thomas Elyot was born before 1490 and died in 1546. He was the son of Sir Richard Elyot and Alice Fynderne. His father was a prominent lawyer, so Thomas received a quality education. Both Cambridge and Oxford claim him as an alumnus, but there is no sufficient evidence either way. He studied mostly liberal arts and philosophy, but also some medicine. In 1510 he married Margaret Aborough. In 1530 he was knighted. In 1531, he was made ambassador to the Emperor, Charles V. In 1538 he published the first Latin-English dictionary. As a writer, he is clear, precise, measured, and practically monotonous. His major works include:

- The Boke named the Governour (1531)
- Of the Knowledge which maketh a Wise Man (1533)
- The Education of Children, translated out of Plutarch (1535)
- Dictionary (1538)
- The Castel of Helth (1539)
- The Defence of Good Women (1540)

The Boke named the Governour is considered to be the first educational treatise in English. It sets out the way of life for member of the English governing class. Between 1531 and 1580, the book went through seven different editions. According to Biblio.com, the Book of the Governor "went through edition after edition all through the sixteenth century. It achieved this fame for many reasons. It is the first work in recognizably modern English prose, to which Elyot added many new words. It provided influential advocacy for the study of the classics, from which he quotes extensively. the principal cause of its popularity was the current vogue for its subject – it is a treatise on moral philosophy, laying down the lines on which the education of those destined to govern should be directed, and inculcating the high moral principles which should rule them in the performance of their duties. There was nothing very original or revolutionary in the thoughts expressed: Elyot acknowledges his debt to the Institutio Principis Christiani of Erasmus and Castiglione’s Il Cortegiano, though not that to Francesco Patrizzi, Bishop of Gaeta at the end of the fifteenth century, whose De Rego et Regis Institutione was certainly the model for The Governour. Nevertheless it remained a textbook for behaviour for generations and had a lasting effect on the writing of English."

== Humanism ==
Elyot wrote his book at the beginning of English Renaissance humanism. During this time, "humanists were distinguished from other scholars not by exclusive focus on human or secular texts, but rather by their focus on secular writings, particularly classical ones, as well as on religious texts and thoughts". It was during this time that the Greek and Roman classics were finally coming back. This is the time when Plato played a significant role in philosophical history. Renaissance humanism also introduced a new richness in the English language – writers began to use rhetoric, and language was viewed as a worthy subject to study. This is why Elyot's book became so popular not only with the people, but also the King.
