= Encyclopaediæ, seu orbis disciplinarum, tam sacrarum quam prophanarum, epistemon =

1559 Latin encyclopedia by Paul Skalic

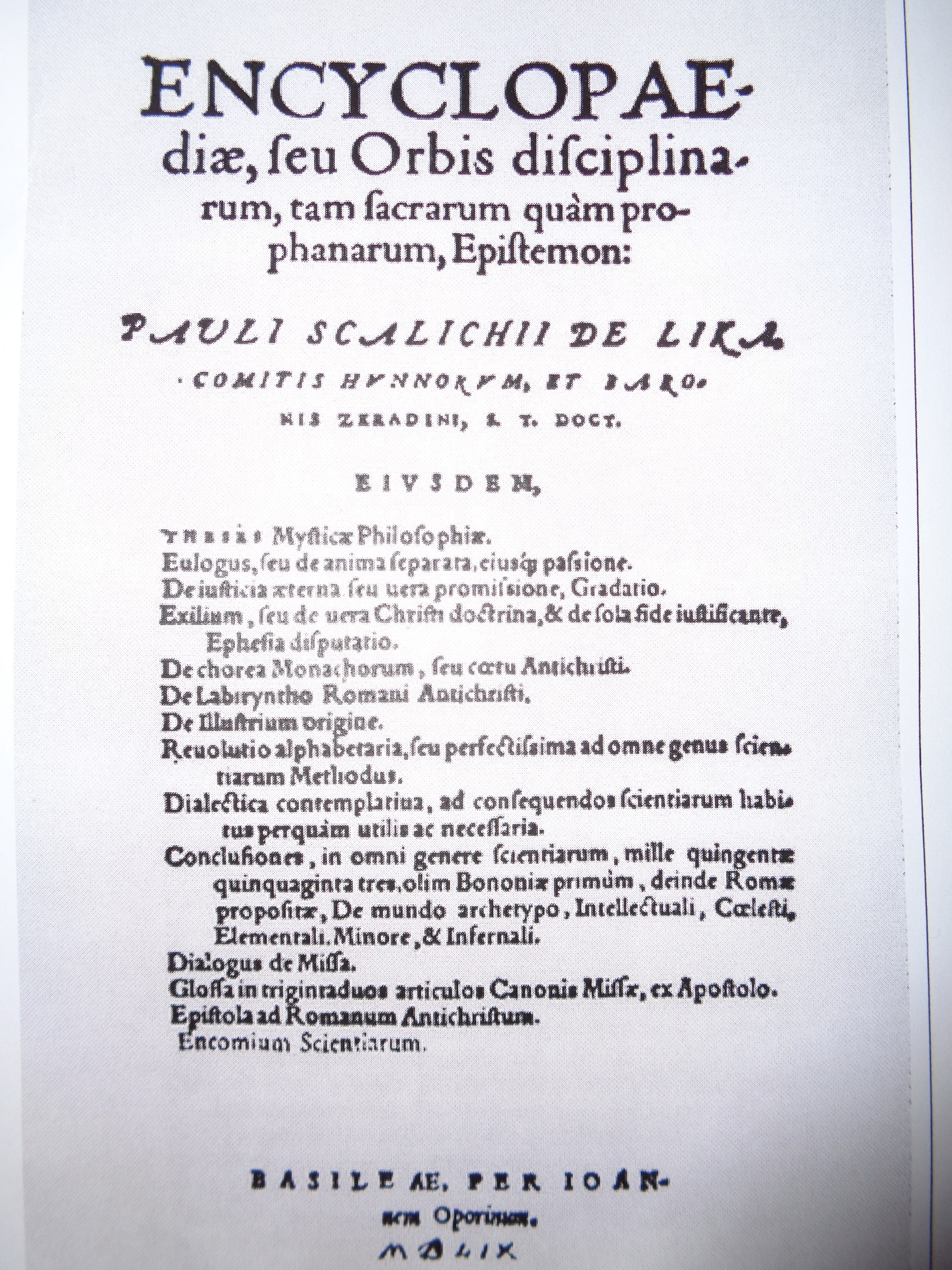
Title page of Skalich's Latin: Encyclopaediæ, seu orbis disciplinarum, tam sacrarum quam prophanarum, epistemon from 1559, arguable one of the first encyclopedias to clearly use the word encyclopediain its title.

Latin: Encyclopaediæ, seu orbis disciplinarum, tam sacrarum quam prophanarum, epistemon ("Encyclopaedia or Knowledge, Both Sacred and Profane, of the World of Disciplines") is an early encyclopedia written in Latin by Zagreb born philosopher Paul Skalic. It was first published in Basel in 1559 and reprinted in Cologne, Germany in 1571. It is often considered to be the first encyclopedia to use the term encyclopedia in its title. This is not to be confused with the first appearance of the word which was disputed by Robert Collison who later reported that the work was poorly written, and that Joachim Sterck van Ringelbergh had used the word "cyclopaedia" to describe his work in 1541.
