= Professional Writers Association of Canada =

The Professional Writers Association of Canada (PWAC) is a professional association representing professional freelance writers in Canada, predominantly in the newspaper and magazine industries. However, PWAC members also write magazine and newspaper articles, books, speeches, newsletters, media releases, white papers, annual reports, advertising and brochure copy, sales and marketing material, Web content, training manuals, film scripts, radio and television documentaries, and much more.

== History ==
The association was formerly known as the Periodical Writers Association of Canada but changed its name to better reflect reality in 2005. It was founded in 1976 and has nearly 600 members across Canada. There are three categories for membership: Professional Members (80% of members are Professional), Associate and Student (for full-time university students).

In 2020, the PWAC membership voted in favour of merging with former members of the Canadian Media Guild (CMG) Freelance Branch, to form the Canadian Freelance Guild, as a group within CWA Canada.

== Mandate ==
PWAC's Mandate:

- Develop and maintain professional standards in editor-writer and client-writer relationships.
- Offset the isolation felt among freelance writers by providing networking opportunities, regular meetings and the chance for writers to share their experiences online and in person.
- Provide professional development workshops and materials for members across the country.
- Encourage higher industry standards and fees for all types of freelance writing.
- Lobby for freedom of the press and freedom of expression in Canada.
- Assist members in finding new business opportunities.
