= Eucolpius =

Eucolpius or Encolpius was an Ancient Roman writer of the third century. He is named by Aelius Lampridius as the author of a life of the emperor Severus Alexander, with whom he lived upon terms of intimacy.

A book published by Thomas Elyot, a man celebrated for his learning in the reign of Henry VIII, under the title The Image of Governance Compiled of the Actes and Sentences Notable, of the Moste Noble Emperour Alexander Severus (1541) was actually a loose translation of Lampridius's contribution towards the Historia Augusta.
