= George Puttenham =

16th-century English writer and literary critic

George Puttenham (1529–1590) was an English writer and literary critic. He is generally considered to be the author of the influential handbook on poetry and rhetoric, The Arte of English Poesie (1589).

== Family and early life ==
Puttenham was the second son of Robert Puttenham of Sherfield-on-Loddon in Hampshire and his wife Margaret, the daughter of Sir Richard Elyot and sister of Sir Thomas Elyot. He had an elder brother, Richard. He matriculated at Christ's College, Cambridge, in November 1546, aged 17, but took no degree, and was admitted to the Middle Temple on 11 August 1556.

In late 1559 or early 1560 Puttenham married Elizabeth, Lady Windsor (1520–1588), the daughter and coheir of Peter Cowdray of Herriard, Hampshire. She was the widow of both Richard, brother of William Paulet, 1st Marquess of Winchester, and William, Baron Windsor. She brought a substantial dowry to the marriage. They had at least one daughter.

Somewhere around 1562, Puttenham travelled abroad to purchase Sherfield House from his elder brother Richard. He immediately quarrelled at Sherfield House with Lady Windsor's brother-in-law, Thomas Paulet, for inciting others to steal a goshawk from him; Paulet admitting to having confronted Puttenham with a dagger and wounding him twice. His circle of enemies notedly widened when Lady Windsor separated from him, suing him for divorce in 1566.

== Domestic disputes and later legal troubles ==
Much of the information known about Puttenham's later personal and professional life stems from court records of the dissolution of his marriage and of his attempt to get out of debt by wresting control of Sherfield House from his niece Anne Morris and her husband, Francis. These documents paint a troubled picture of Puttenham as a compulsive adulterer, a serial rapist and a wife-beater. In addition he seems to have followed his elder brother's precedent in having at least one child with his maidservants. One he took to Flanders and abandoned. One of the more lascivious stories asserts that when Puttenham was forty-three, he had his servant kidnap a 17-year-old girl in London and bring her to his farm at Upton Grey near Sherfield, where he raped her and kept her locked up for three years.

While the veracity of these court records should reasonably be questioned (given the particularly nasty nature of Puttenham's divorce and the tendency of early modern court cases to present the most fantastical accounts of their participants), surprisingly little was said in defence of Puttenham's character. It is, perhaps, telling that the neutral observer Richard Horne, Bishop of Winchester, reacted with surprise and disdain to Puttenham's appointment as a Justice of the Peace, writing to William Cecil, Lord Burghley, hoping that it "be not true, for his evil life is well knowne."

In 1579 he presented to Elizabeth I his Partheniades (printed in a collection of manuscript Ballads by F. J. Furnivall), and he wrote the treatise in question especially for the delectation of the queen and her ladies. He mentions nine other works of his, none of which are extant. Puttenham is said to have been implicated in a plot against Lord Burghley in 1570 and in December 1578 was imprisoned. In 1585 he received reparation from the privy council for alleged wrongs suffered at the hands of his relations. His will is dated 1 September 1590.

== Authorship of The Arte of English Poesie ==
The Arte of English Poesie was entered at Stationers' Hall in 1588, and published in the following year with a dedicatory letter to Lord Burghley written by the printer Richard Field, who professed ignorance of the writer's name and position. However, alterations to the text made during the press run indicate that the author must have been alive and that Field must have known his identity. The first reference to the work was made in the preface to Sir John Harrington's translation of Orlando Furioso (1591) in reaction to Puttenham's view of translators as mere versifiers. Harrington disparages Puttenham's assertion that poetry is an art rather than a gift, holding up Puttenham's own poetry as proof because "he sheweth himself so slender a gift in it." Although Harrington does not name Puttenham, in a surviving manuscript note concerning the publication of his own book, he asks Field to publish it "in the same print that Putnams book is", which he did.

In an essay published in the second edition of William Camden's Remaines (1614), Richard Carew writes, "look into our Imitations of all sorts of verses by any other language, and you shall finde that Sir Philip Sidney, Maister Puttenham, Maister Stanihurst, and divers more have made use how farre wee are within compasse of a fore imagined impossibility in that behalfe". Around the same time, in his Hypercritica (not published until 1722), Edmund Bolton writes of "the elegant, witty, and artificial book of the Art of English Poetrie, (the work as the fame is) of one of [Queen Elizabeth's] Gentleman Pensioners, Puttenham". Since Puttenham received two leases in reversion from the queen in 1588, this seems to clearly identify him as the author.

Certain biographical details in The Arte may point to a Puttenham as the author. He was educated at Oxford, and at the age of 18 he addressed an eclogue entitled Elpine to Edward VI. In his youth he had visited Spain, France, and Italy, and was better acquainted with foreign courts than with his own.

There is no direct evidence beyond Bolton's ascription to identify the author with George or Richard Puttenham, the sons of Robert Puttenham and his wife Margaret, the sister of Sir Thomas Elyot, who dedicated his treatise on the Education or Bringing up of Children to her for the benefit of her sons. Furthermore, since Bolton's ascription occurs 15 years after George's death and four after Richard's neither man would have been able to either accept or reject the attribution. Both made unhappy marriages, were constantly engaged in litigation, and were frequently in disgrace. One fact that points towards George's authorship is that Richard was in prison when the book was licensed to be printed, and when he made his will in 1597 he was in the Queen's Bench Prison. He was buried, according to John Payne Collier, at St. Clement Danes, London, on 2 July 1601. Richard Puttenham is known to have spent much of his time abroad, whereas George is only known to have left England a single time, to get the deed for Sherfield House from his brother. This agrees better with the writer's account of himself; but if the statement that he addressed Elpine to Edward VI when he was 18 years of age be taken to imply that the production of this work fell within that king's reign, the date of the author's birth cannot be placed anterior to 1529. At the date (1546) of his inheritance of his uncle, Sir Thomas Elyot's estates, Richard Puttenham was proved in an inquisition held at Newmarket to have been twenty-six years old. The history of the Puttenhams is discussed in H. H. S. Croft's edition of Elyot's Boke called the Cover nour. A careful investigation brought him to the conclusion that the evidence was in favour of Richard. There are other modern editions of the book, notably one in Joseph Haslewood's Ancient Critical Essays (1811–1815). For editions with critical apparatus see Willcock and Walker's Cambridge edition of 1936 and Whigham and Rebhorn's new critical edition (Cornell UP, 2007).

== The Arte of English Poesie ==
Whoever the author may have been, there is no doubt about the importance of the work, which is the most systematic and comprehensive treatise of the time on its subject. It is "contrived into three books: the first of poets and poesies, the second of proportion, the third of ornament." Puttenham's book covers a general history of the art of poetry, and a discussion of the various forms of poetry; the second treats of prosody, dealing in turn with the measures in use in English verse, the caesura, punctuation, rhyme, accent, cadence, proportion in figure, which the author illustrates by geometrical diagrams, and the proposed innovations of English quantitative verse; the section on ornament deals with style, the distinctions between written and spoken language, the figures of speech; and the author closes with lengthy observations on good manners. He deprecates the use of archaisms, and although he allows that the purer Saxon speech is spoken beyond the Trent, he advises the English writer to take as his model the usual speech of the court, of London and the home counties.

Book I, "Of Poets and Poesie", contains a remarkably credible history of poetry in Greek, Latin and in English. All subjects, including science and law, were in primitive times written in verse, and the types of poetry number in the dozens. Because it is decorated with versification and figures of speech, poetry is a more persuasive and melodious form of language, and is very much given to structure and accuracy. The countless examples of dignities and promotions given to poets throughout history, and the numerous examples of royal poets, show up the ignorance of Renaissance courtiers who suppress their poetry or publish under a pseudonym.

In Book II, "Of Proportion Poetical", Puttenham compares metrical form to arithmetical, geometrical, and musical pattern. He adduces five points to English verse structure: the "Staffe", the "Measure", "Concord or Symphony", "Situation" and "Figure".

The staff, or stanza, is four to ten lines that join without intermission and finish up all of the sentences thereof. Each length of stanza suits a poetic tone and genre. Each is overlaid by a closed rhyme scheme. This latter, termed "band" (65) and "enterlacement" (70), is of primary concern to Puttenham. He views English as having solely a syllabic system of measure, or metre. The length of lines may alternate in patterns that support the rhyme scheme, and so increase the band. Syllabic length is a factor but accentuation is not. Caesura should occur at the same place in every line; it helps to keep up distinctness and clarity, two virtues of civil language.

"Concord, called Symphonie or rime" (76) is an accommodation made for the lack of metrical feet in English versification. The matching of line lengths, rhymed at the end, in symmetrical patterns, is a further accommodation. A number of graphs are shown to illustrate the variety of rhyme schemes and line-length patterns, or situation. The poet who can work melodiously within the strictures of versification proves a "crafts master", a valuable literary virtue. Proportion in figure is the composition of stanzas in graphic forms ranging from the rhombus to the spire.

Book III, "Of Ornament", which comprises a full half of the Arte, is a catalogue of figures of speech, in the tradition of Richard Sherry, Henry Peacham, Abraham Fraunce and Angel Day. Since language is inherently artificial, and "not naturall to man" (120), the added artifice of figures is particularly suitable. Figures give more "pithe and substance, subtilitie, quicknesse, efficacie or moderation, in this or that sort tuning and tempring them by amplification, abridgement, opening, closing, enforcing, meekening or otherwise disposing them to the best purpose ..." (134). From page 136 to 225, Puttenham lists and analyses figures of speech. His book concludes with a lengthy analysis of "decency", and the artificial and natural dimensions of language.

== Influence of The Arte of English Poesie ==
Many later "poetics" are indebted to this book. The original edition is very rare. Edward Arber's reprint (1869) contains a clear summary of the various documents with regard to the authorship of this treatise. According to Puttenham, presumptive author of The Arte of English Poesie, Sir Thomas Wyatt and Henry Howard, Earl of Surrey, "trauailed into Italie" (49) and brought back the verse forms that make them "the first reformers of our English meter and stile" (49). The introduction of these new Italian forms in turn necessitated the flurry of Renaissance poetry manuals, by George Gascoigne, Samuel Daniel, Charles Webb and Sir Philip Sidney, in addition to Puttenham's Arte. There is currently debate about Puttenham's relative authority in comparison to these other figures.
