= Margaret à Barrow =

English Lady

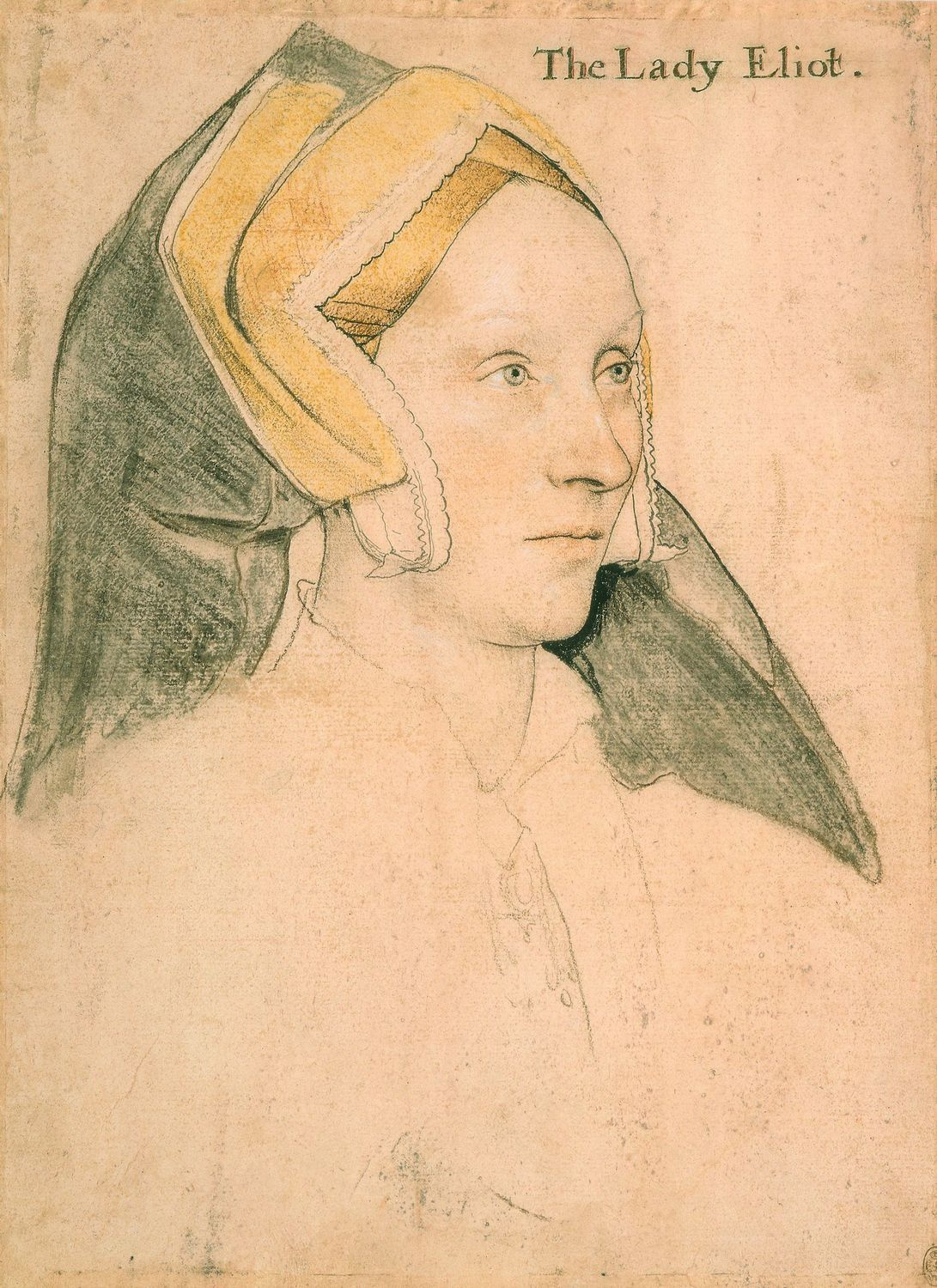
- Portrait of Margaret, Lady Elyot, c. 1532–34 by Hans Holbein the Younger. Study for a painting now lost. Royal Collection, Windsor Castle.
- Born: 1500
- Died: 26 August 1560 (aged 59–60)
- Spouses: Thomas Elyot (m, c. 1520) (died 1545) James Dyer (m. 1550)
- Father: Sir Thomas à Barrow

Margaret à Barrow (1500 – 26 August 1560) was an English lady, well known for her learning. She is sometimes referred to as Margaret Aborough (a variant of à Barrow) or as Margaret, Lady Elyot.

Margaret was the daughter of Sir Thomas à Barrow (or Aborough) and she was one of a small group of children educated at the home of Thomas More. Her childhood studies, alongside More's daughter Margaret, included "law, history, philosophy, and theology." Her links to More continued into adulthood, and she was present at meetings at his home in which intellectuals discussed humanist theology.

Around 1520, Margaret married the author Thomas Elyot. Margaret and Elyot sat for portraits by Hans Holbein the Younger at the home of Thomas More. No oil paintings of these portraits survive; however, the original drawings are held by the Royal Collection Trust.

Although it is unknown how it came into her possession, she owned the Yale Law School Manuscript of the Nova Statuta Angliae, and despite its value, she did not sell it. Instead she gave it as a gift to George Freville, a Cambridgeshire lawyer after her husband's death. Thomas Elyot died in approximately 1545, and Margaret would go on to marry, as her second husband, Sir James Dyer in April 1551. Dyer was a member of the Middle Temple and scholarly lawyer who became Speaker of the House of Commons.

She died on 26 August 1560 and is buried in St Andrew Churchyard, Great Staughton.
