= Paul Skalich =

Humanist from Croatia (1534–1573)

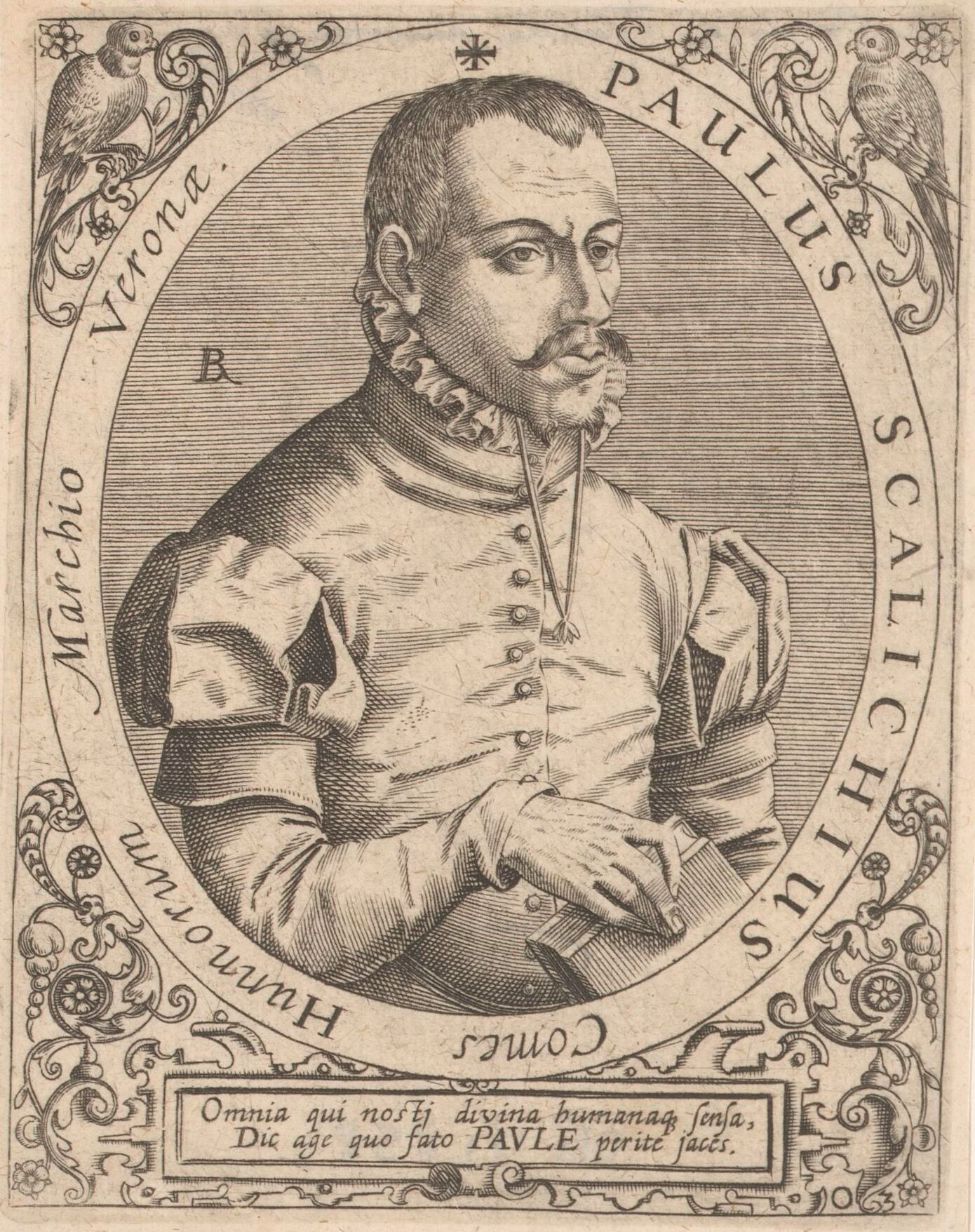
Portrait of Paul Skalich

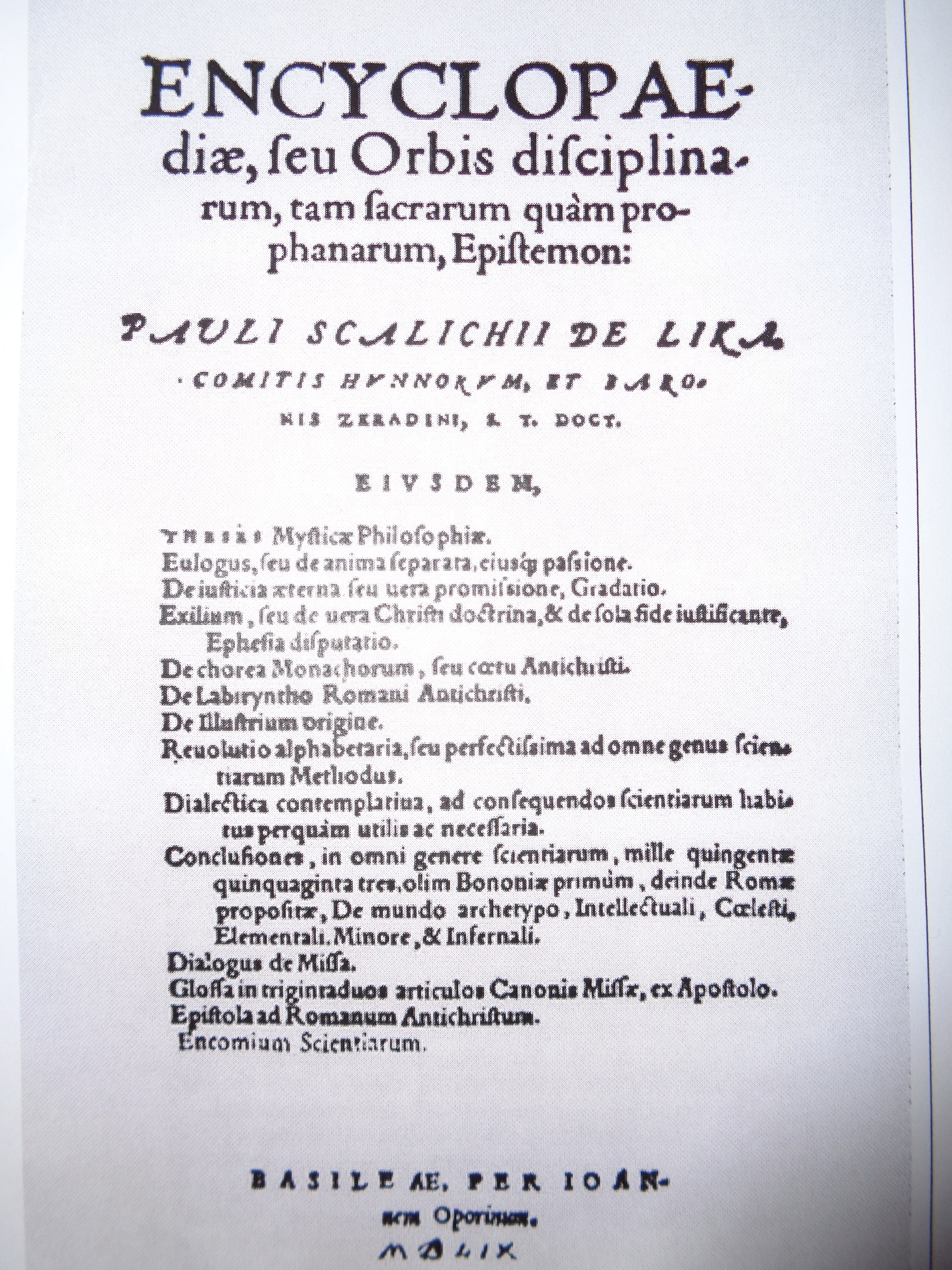
Title page of Skalich's Encyclopaedia seu orbis disciplinarum tam sacrarum quam prophanarum epistemon from 1559, arguable one of the first encyclopedias to clearly use the word encyclopedia in its title.

Paul Skalich (1534–1573), also known as Stanislav Pavao Skalić or Paulus Scalichius de Lika, was an encyclopedist, Renaissance humanist, polymath and adventurer born in Zagreb (modern Croatia) and who lived part of his life in the Holy Roman Empire. (modern Germany) His surname is rendered in various other ways: e.g., in English, Skalich, Scalich, Scaliger; in Latin, Scalichius or Scaligius; and Spanish, Scalitzius.

== Biography ==
Skalić studied theology and philosophy in Vienna and later moved around Europe, living in Bologna, Rome, Bohemia, Poland, France and Germany, among other places.

His book Encyclopaedia seu orbis disciplinarum tam sacrarum quam prophanarum epistemon ("Encyclopaedia, or Knowledge of the World of Disciplines"; Basel, 1559) is one of the first books entitled encyclopedia. Robert Collison later wrote that the work was poorly written, only being important today for its use of the word encyclopaedia, and that Joachim Sterck van Ringelbergh had used the word cyclopedia to describe his work in 1541. Skalić also wrote a treatise on music: Dialogus de Lyra (Cologne, 1570).

He and preacher Johann Funck exercised great influence over Albert (1490-1568), first duke of Prussia, and became wealthy. Religious differences with the king of Poland led to the execution of Funck and the rise of Skalić.

== Nationality ==
References vary regarding Skalić's nationality. M. Girardi-Karšulin at the University of Zagreb claims that he was Croatian, as do the historians Joseph F. Patrouch and Stephen L. Wailes, and other sources. However, according to Encarta he was German.
