= Hans Ackermann =

German dramatist

Hans Ackermann (16th century) was a German dramatist, living in Zwickau. He was a close friend of Paul Rebhun, another contemporary dramatist.

== Publications ==
- Der Verlorene Sohn, 1536
- Tobias, praising marriage as opposed to the celibacy promoted by the catholic church.

== Sources ==
- Allgemeine Deutsche Biographie - online version at Wikisource
