= Testament Newydd ein Arglwydd Iesu Christ =

The Testament Newydd ein Arglwydd Iesu Christ is an early Welsh translation of the New Testament.

The translation was published by William Salesbury on the 7th of October 1567. Salesbury used scholarly vocabulary rather than everyday language in his Testament and altered the spelling of Welsh words in order to make them appear more similar to Latin. His translation is an important milestone in the history of Welsh publishing and provided the people of Wales with the Scriptures in their own language for the first time. It was also the basis for William Morgan's translation of the whole Bible (1588), a version that was used by the people of Wales, with little change, for the next four centuries.
