= Johannes Potken =

Johannes Potken (Latin: Potkenius; c. 1470 – c. 1525) was a German scholar, papal secretary and printer from Cologne, active at the beginning of the sixteenth century. In 1513, he had the Psalterium David et Cantica aliqua printed in Rome, in the Ge'ez language. It was a collection of psalms and other canticles.

Potken had learned Ge'ez from the Ethiopian Abba Thomas Walda Samuel, a pilgrim to Jerusalem and guest of Pope Leo X. This was the beginning of European publishing of Ethiopian literature (although misidentified by Potken as "Chaldean"). The work included a syllabary, Alphabetum, seu potius Syllabarium literarum Chaldaearum. The font was cut by Marcellus Silber, a printer in Regensburg.

He was in Rome as a long term papal protonotary; he became provost of the church of St. Georg in Cologne. Potken also edited the quadrilingual Psalterium in quatuor linguis Hebraea Graeca Chaldaea Latina, which appeared in 1518, with Johann Soter (i.e. Johann Heyl). He was a correspondent of Sebastian Brant and Johannes Reuchlin.
