= James Dyer =

English politician (1510–1582)

Sir James Dyer
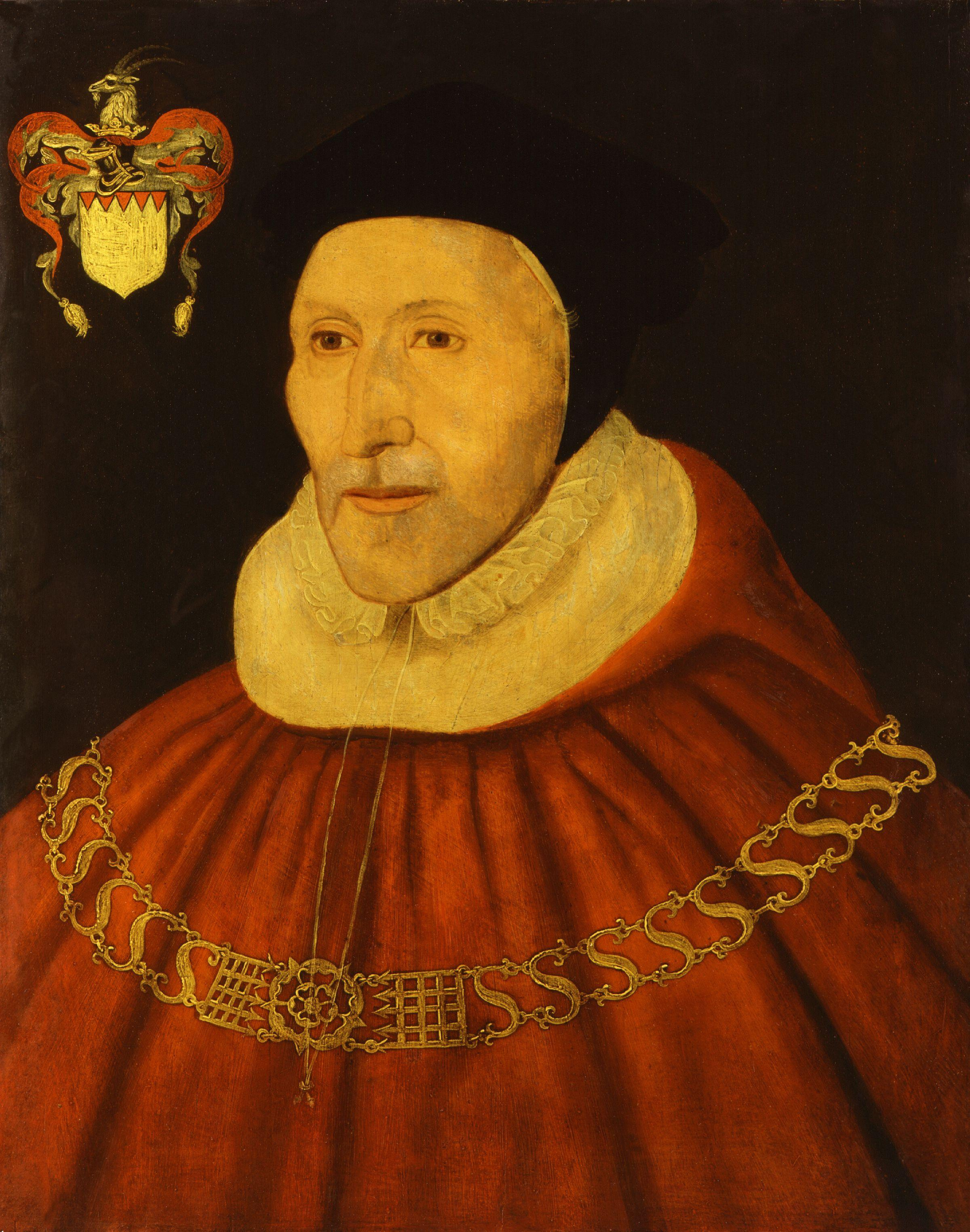
- Sir James Dyer, 1575. National Portrait Gallery, London.

Speaker of the House of Commons
- In office 1553–1553
- Monarch: Edward VI
- Preceded by: Sir John Baker
- Succeeded by: Sir John Pollard

Chief Justice of the Common Pleas
- In office 1559–1582
- Preceded by: Sir Anthony Browne
- Succeeded by: Sir Edmund Anderson

Personal details
- Born: 1510
- Died: 24 March 1582 (aged 71–72)
- Spouse: Margaret à Barrow

Sir James Dyer (1510 – 24 March 1582) was a judge and Speaker of the House of Commons during the reign of Edward VI.

== Life ==
Dyer was knighted at Whitehall on 9 April 1553, Strand Inn, preparatory 1520s, Middle Temple abt. 1530, called to the bar 1537?, bencher 1540s, serjeant-at-law 17 Oct. 1552, MP for Wells, in Somerset, and knight of the shire for Cambridgeshire 1547 and 1553, Speaker of the House of Commons 1553, justice of the peace for Cambridgeshire 1547, judge of the court of common pleas 1557, Chief Justice of the Common Pleas from January 1559 until his death.

Dyer was the first law reporter, establishing the system of reporting law cases that has endured into the modern era. The concept of legal precedent began with reported cases. Prior to Dyer's Reports, from 1292 up until the 16th century, law cases had been recorded in "yearbooks" and were not intended to serve as precedent in future cases. The three volume work was originally written in Anglo-French and later translated into English by John Vaillant in 1794. It covers cases from the period 1513–1582.

His heir was his brother's grandson, Sir Richard Dyer.

== Reputation ==
"A judge of profound knowledge and judgment in the laws of the land, and principally in the form of good pleading and true entries of judgments, and of great piety and sincerity, who in his heart abhorred all corruption and deceit; of a bountiful and generous disposition, a patron and preferrer of men learned in the law and expert clerks; of singular assiduity and observation, as appears by his book of reports, all written with his own hand, and of a fine, reverend and venerable countenance and personage." (Coke, 9.14v–15)

Political offices
Preceded by Sir John Baker	Speaker of the House of Commons; 1553	Succeeded by Sir John Pollard
Legal offices
Preceded by Sir Anthony Browne	Chief Justice of the Common Pleas; 1559–1582	Succeeded by Sir Edmund Anderson
