= Richard Elyot =

Sir Richard Elyot, SL (died 1522) was an English landowner and judge. He was Member of Parliament for Salisbury in 1495.

== Life ==
The Elyot family of Coker had T. S. Eliot as a celebrated descendant. Elyot himself held estates in Wiltshire and in 1503 became serjeant-at-law and Attorney-General to the Queen consort, Elizabeth of York. Soon afterwards he was commissioned to act as Justice of Assize on the western circuit, becoming in 1513 judge of the Court of Common Pleas.

== Family ==
Elyot's first marriage was with Alice, daughter of Sir Thomas de la Mare of Aldermaston House in Berkshire and widow of Thomas D'Abridgecourt of Stratfield Saye House in Hampshire. The marriage brought him a son and two daughters. The son Thomas Elyot became well known as author; and one of the daughters, Margaret was the mother of George Puttenham.

Elyot later married Elizabeth, widow of Richard Fettiplace of East Shefford and daughter and heiress of William Bessels of Besselsleigh.
