= The English Secretary =

16th century book

The English Secretary (originally The English Secretorie) is a book by the rhetorician Angel Day, first published in 1586. Among the most notable and popular manuals of letter writing in the 16th and 17th centuries, the work combines influences from medieval practices and Renaissance humanism, and reflects the expansion of the reading public in Elizabethan England.
