= Luis Barahona de Soto =

Spanish poet

Luis Barahona de Soto (1548 – 5 November 1595) was a Spanish poet.

Born at Lucena (Cordoba), he was educated at Granada, and practised as a physician at Archidona (Málaga). His major work is the Primera parte de la Angélica (1586), a continuation of the Orlando furioso. The second part of the poem was long believed to be lost, but fragments of it have been identified in the anonymous Diálogos de la monteria, first printed in 1890; the Diálogos also embody fragments of a poem by Barahona entitled Los Principios del mundo, and many graceful lyrics by the same writer have been published by Francisco Rodríguez Marín.

Miguel de Cervantes describes Barahona as "one of the best poets not only in Spain, but in the whole world"; this is friendly hyperbole. Nevertheless Barahona has poetic imagination, ingenious fancy, and an exceptional mastery of the methods transplanted to Spain from Italy. His Angélica has been reproduced in facsimile (New York, 1904) by Archer M Huntington.
