= Angel Day =

Angel Day was an Elizabethan rhetorician and scholar chiefly known for his The English Secretary (1586), the first comprehensive epistolary manual to employ original English rather than classical models. The book belongs to the genre of instructional manuals, marketed for the growing business and middle classes of late 16th century England, and was extremely popular, going into as many as ten editions by 1635, and becoming the most influential correspondence manual of its time. Although his biography is poorly documented, entries on Day have appeared in the Dictionary of National Biography.

Day's precise dates are not known, but an entry in the Stationer's Register shows that he was of an age to begin a trade by 1563, for on 25 December that year he was apprenticed to the stationer Thomas Duxell. This would fix his date of birth sometime in the period 1546–50. He married Frauncis Warley on 4 December 1581.

The English Secretary was patronized by Day's literary associate, Edward de Vere, 17th Earl of Oxford, to whom at least several of the editions (1586, 1592, 1595, 1599, 1607, 1614, 1621, 1625, and 1635) were dedicated.
