= Joachim Sterck van Ringelbergh =

Flemish scholar, mathematician and astrologer

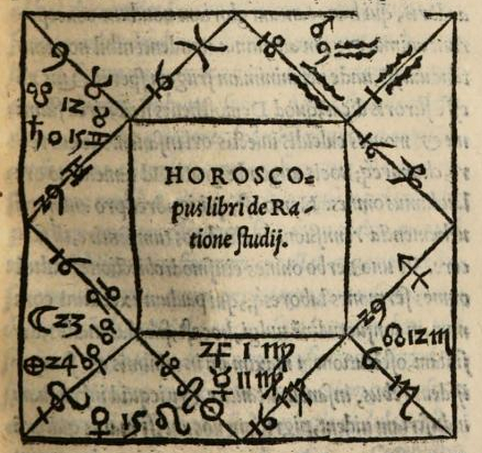
Joachim Sterck van Ringelbergh, Horoscope of the treatise De ratione studii at the very end of this treatise

Joachim Sterck van Ringelbergh (Joachimus Fortius Ringelbergius) (Antwerp, c. 1499 – c. 1531) was a Flemish scholar, humanist, mathematician and astrologer.

His Lucubrationes vel potius absolutissima kyklopaideia (Basileae: Westhemer, 1588) was the first work to use a version of the word "cyclopaedia" in its title.

He is known also for his book on pedagogy, De Ratione Studii.
