= Thomas Elyot =

English politician and writer

Sir Thomas Elyot
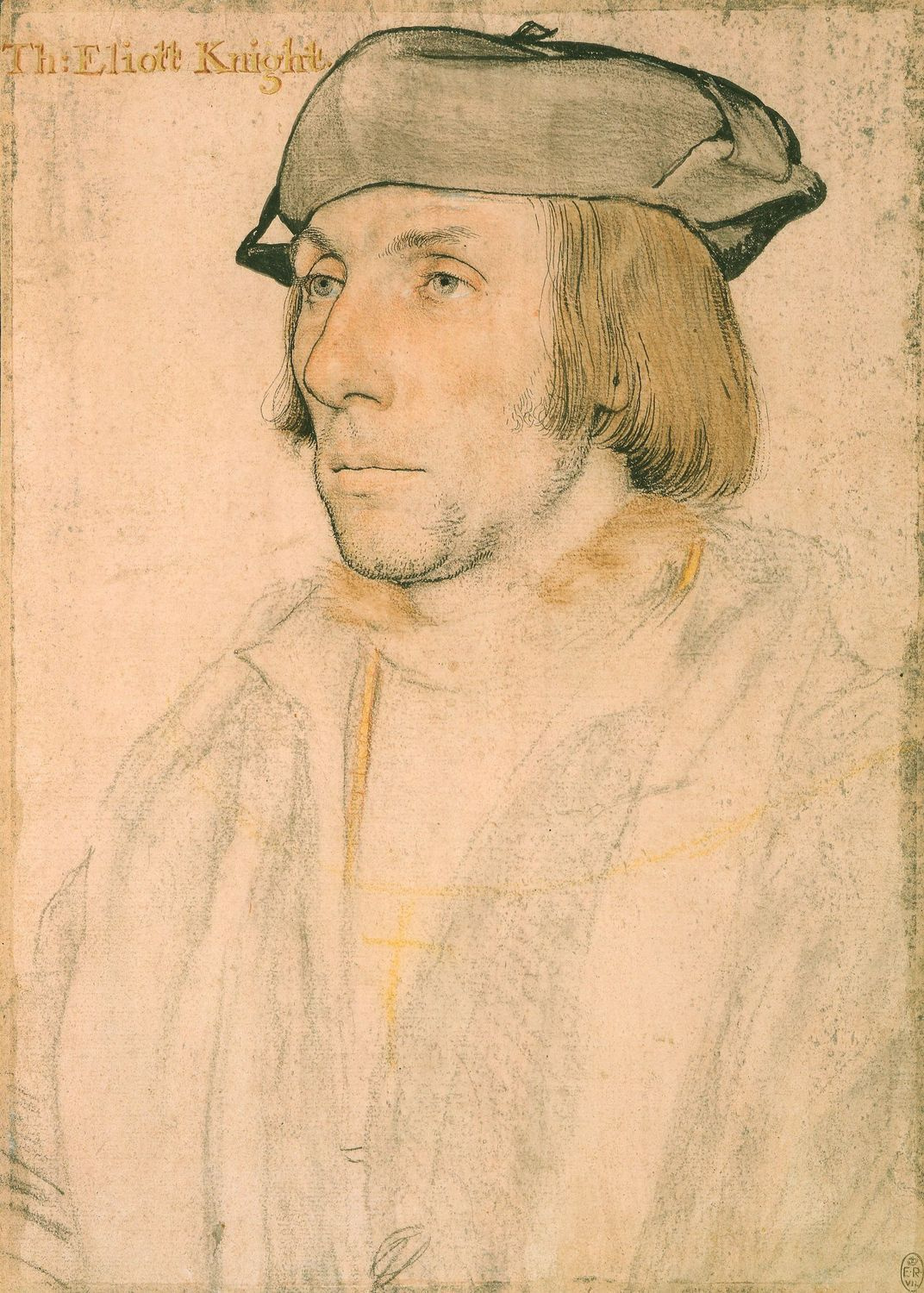
- Study for a lost portrait of Sir Thomas Elyot, drawn by Hans Holbein the Younger
- Born: c. 1490
- Died: 26 March 1546 (aged 49–50)
- Occupations: Author; Diplomat
- Spouse: Margaret à Barrow
- Parents: Richard Elyot (father); Alice De la Mare (mother)

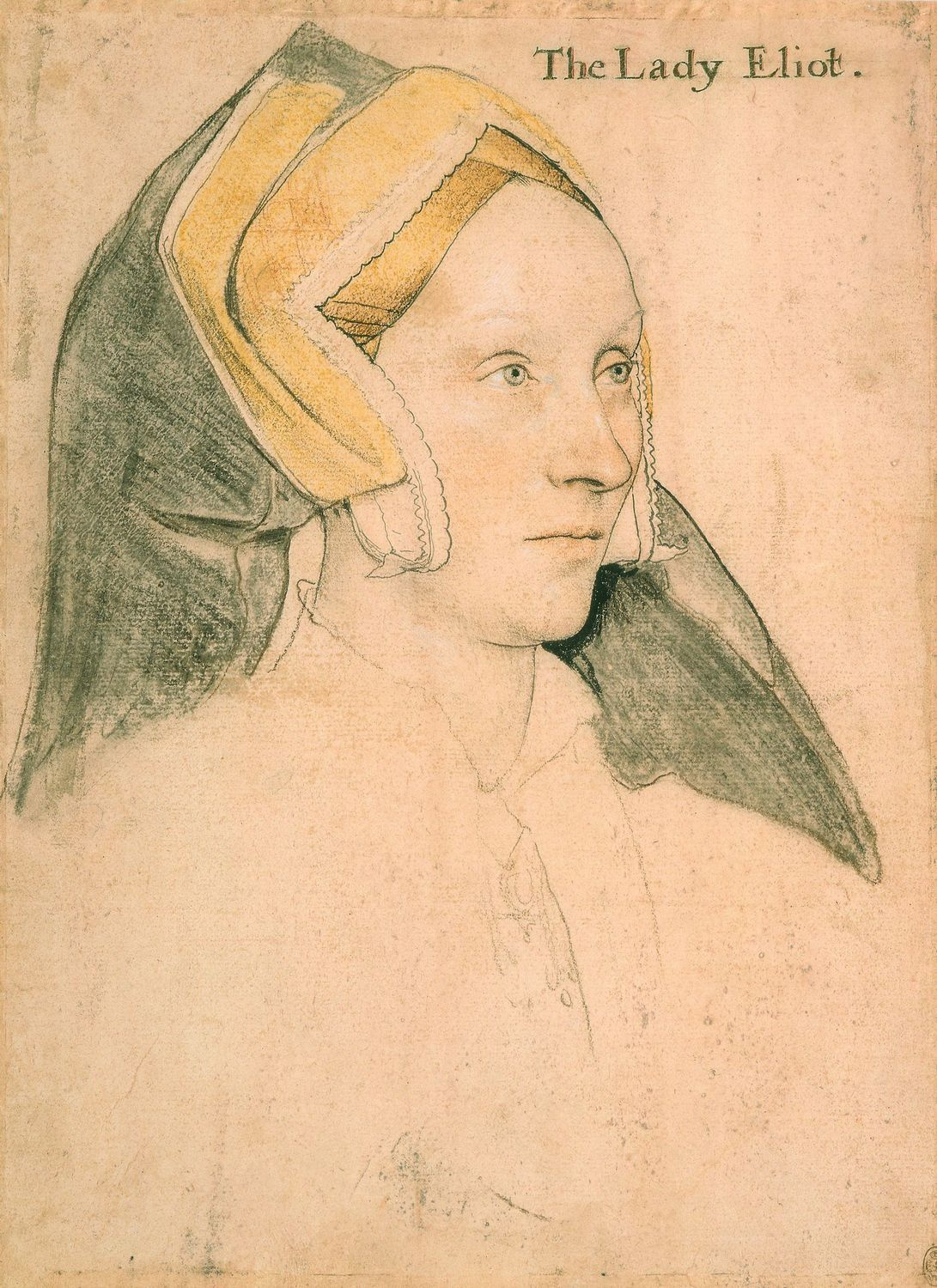
Study for a portrait of Margaret, Lady Elyot

Sir Thomas Elyot (c.1496 – 26 March 1546) was an English diplomat and scholar. He is best known as one of the first proponents of the use of the English language for literary purposes.

== Early life ==
Thomas was the child of Sir Richard Elyot's first marriage with Alice De la Mare, but neither the date nor place of his birth is accurately known. Alice's first husband Thomas Dabridgecourt had died 10 Oct 1495 so this next marriage has to follow that date.

Anthony Wood claimed him as an alumnus of St Mary Hall, Oxford, while C. H. Cooper in the Athenae Cantabrigienses put in a claim for Jesus College, Cambridge. Elyot himself says in the preface to his Dictionary that he was educated under the paternal roof, and was from the age of twelve his own tutor. He supplies, in the introduction to his Castel of Helth, a list of the authors he had read in philosophy and medicine, adding that a "worshipful physician" (Thomas Linacre) read to him from Galen and some other authors.

== Career ==
In 1511 he accompanied his father on the western circuit as clerk to the assize, and he held this position until 1528. In addition to his father's lands in Wiltshire and Oxfordshire he inherited in 1523 the Cambridge estates of his cousin, Thomas Fynderne. His title was disputed, but Cardinal Wolsey decided in his favour, and also made him clerk of the Privy Council. Elyot, in a letter addressed to Thomas Cromwell, says that he never received the emoluments of this office, while the empty honour of knighthood conferred on him when he was displaced in 1530 merely put him to further expense. In that year he sat on the commission appointed to inquire into the Cambridgeshire estates of his former patron, Wolsey. He was appointed High Sheriff of Oxfordshire and Berkshire in 1527.

In 1531 he received instructions to proceed to the court of Charles V, Holy Roman Emperor, to try to persuade him to take a more favourable view of Henry's proposed divorce from Catherine of Aragon, the emperor's aunt. With this was combined another commission, on which one of the king's agents, Stephen Vaughan, was already engaged. He was, if possible, to apprehend William Tyndale. Elyot was probably suspected, like Vaughan, of lukewarmness in carrying out the king's wishes, but was nevertheless blamed by Protestant writers. As ambassador Elyot had been involved in ruinous expense, and on his return he wrote unsuccessfully to Cromwell begging to be excused, on the grounds of his poverty, from serving as High Sheriff of Cambridgeshire and Huntingdonshire for 1532.

He was one of the commissioners in the inquiry instituted by Cromwell prior to the suppression of the monasteries but he did not obtain any share of the spoils. There is little doubt that his known friendship for More militated against his chances of success, for in a letter addressed to Cromwell he admitted his friendship for More, but protested that he rated higher his duty to the king. William Roper, in his Life of More, says that Elyot was on a second embassy to Charles V in the winter of 1535–1536 and received the news of More's execution while at Naples. He had been kept in the dark by his own government, but heard the news from the emperor, or so Roper says, writing years later, but R. W. Chambers writes that Roper had confused the timing of Elyot's ambassadorship, and of the emperor's remarks—about More's resignation, not his execution. The story of an earlier embassy to Rome (1532), mentioned by Burnet, rests on a late endorsement of instructions dated from that year, which cannot be regarded as authoritative.

From 1539 to 1542 he represented the borough of Cambridge in parliament. He had purchased from Cromwell the manor of Carleton in Cambridgeshire, where he died.

== Private life ==
He married Margaret à Barrow, described as a student in the "school" of Sir Thomas More. He had no children.

== Scholarship ==
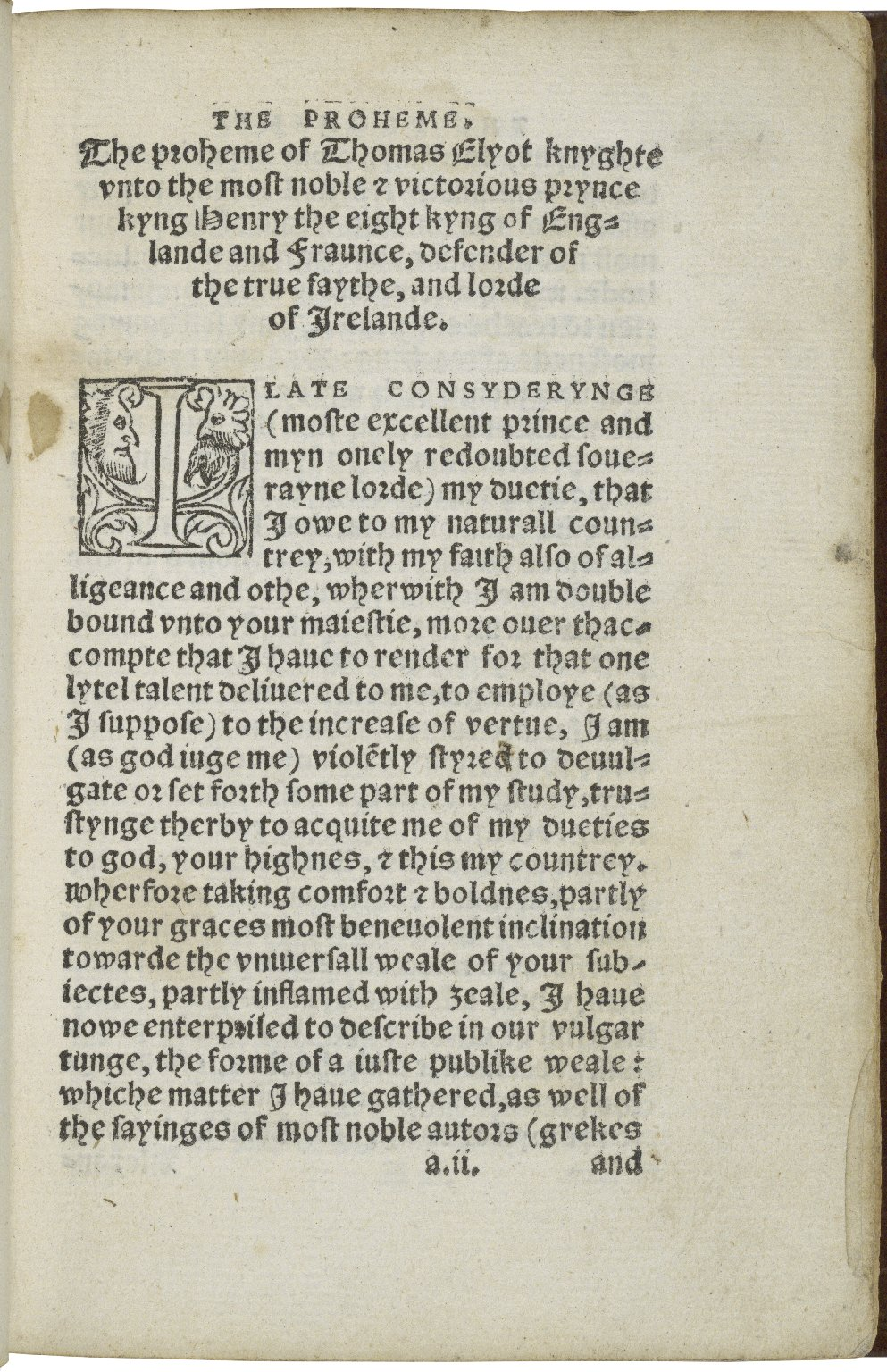
The first page of The boke named the Gouervnour, deuysed by syr Thomas Elyot knight, from a 1537 printing

Elyot received little reward for his services to the state, but his scholarship and his books were held in high esteem by his contemporaries.

Elyot was a supporter of the humanists' ideas concerning the education of women; writing in support of learned women, he published the Defence of Good Women. In this writing he supported Thomas More and other humanist authors' ideals of educated wives who would be able to provide intellectual companionship for their husbands and educated moral training for their children.

In 1531 he produced The Boke named the Governour, dedicated to King Henry VIII which was printed by Thomas Berthelet (1531, 1534, 1536, 1544, etc.). It is a treatise on moral philosophy, intended to direct the education of those destined to fill high positions, and to inculcate those moral principles which alone could fit them for the performance of their duties. The subject was a favourite one in the 16th century, and the book, which contained many citations from classical authors, was very popular. Elyot expressly acknowledges his obligations to Erasmus's Institutio Principis Christiani but he makes no reference to the De regno et regis institutione of Francesco Patrizzi (died 1494), bishop of Gaeta, on which his work was undoubtedly modelled.

As a prose writer, Elyot enriched the English language with many new words. In 1536 he published The Castel of Helth, a popular treatise on medicine, intended to place a scientific knowledge of the art within the reach of those unacquainted with Greek. This work, though scoffed at by the faculty, was appreciated by the general public, and speedily went through seventeen editions. His Latin Dictionary, the earliest comprehensive dictionary of the language, was completed in 1538. The copy of the first edition in the British Library contains an autograph letter from Elyot to Cromwell, to whom it originally belonged. It was edited and enlarged in 1584 by Thomas Cooper, Bishop of Winchester, who called it Bibliotheca Eliotae, and it formed the basis in 1565 of Cooper's Thesaurus linguae Romanae et Britannicae.

His work The Image of Governance Compiled of the Actes and Sentences Notable, of the Moste Noble Emperour Alexander Severus (1541) professed to be a translation from a Greek manuscript of the emperor's secretary Encolpius (or Eucolpius, as Elyot calls him), which had been lent him by a gentleman of Naples, called Pudericus, who asked to have it back before the translation was complete. In these circumstances Elyot, as he asserts in his preface, supplied the other maxims from different sources. However, the work is actually a loose translation of Aelius Lampridius's contribution towards the Historia Augusta.

He was harshly critiqued by Humphrey Hody and William Wotton for putting forward a pseudo-translation but Henry Herbert Stephen Croft (1842–1923) later discovered that there was a Neapolitan gentleman at that time bearing the name of Poderico, or, Latinized, Pudericus, with whom Elyot may well have been acquainted. Roger Ascham mentions his De rebus memorabilibus Angliae and William Webbe quotes a few lines of a lost translation of the Ars Poetica of Horace.

== Select list of Elyot's translations ==
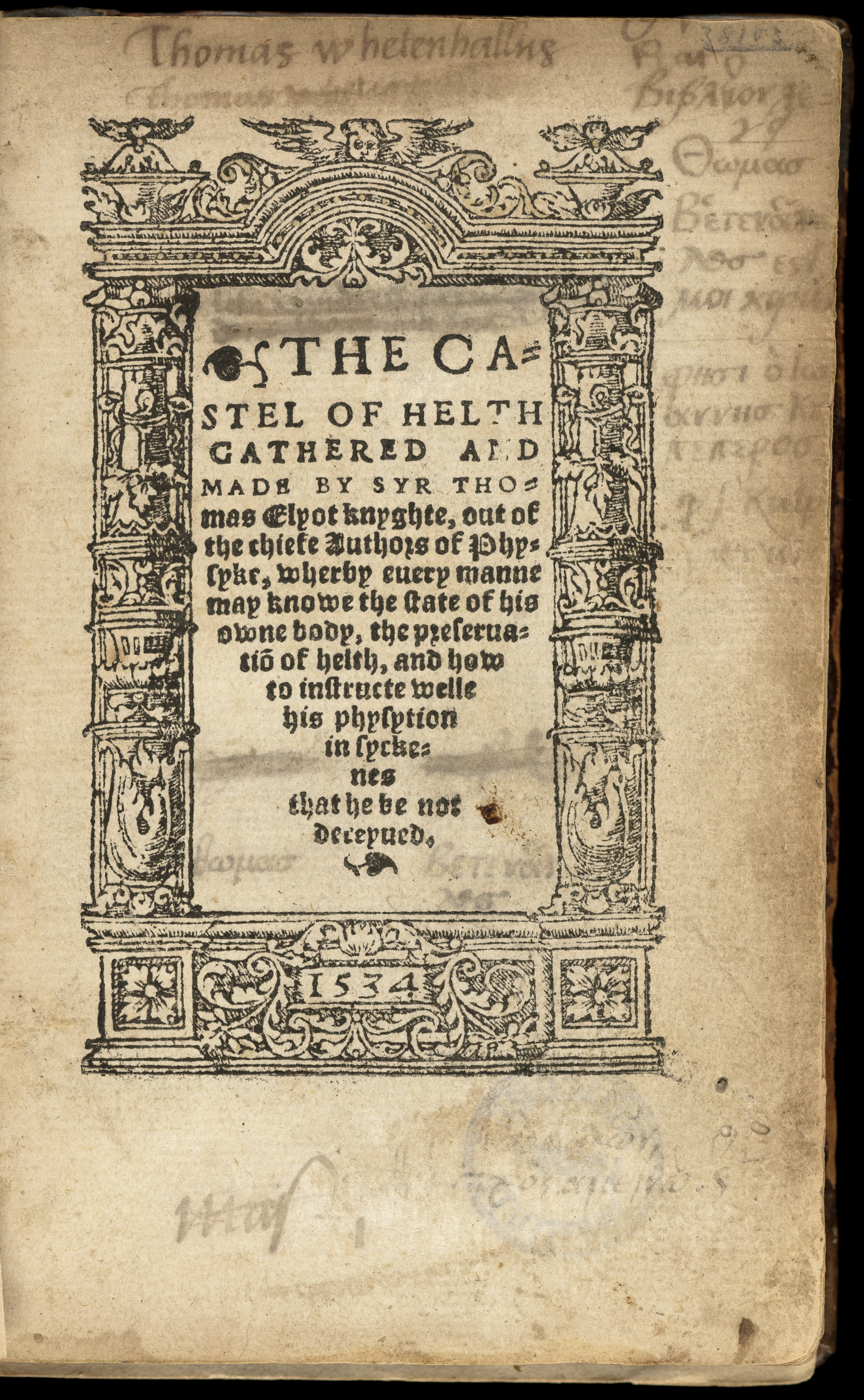
The Castel of Helth

- The Doctrinal of Princes (1533?), from Isocrates
- Cyprianus, A Swete and Devoute Sermon of Holy Saynt Ciprian of the Mortalitie of Man (1534)
- Rules of a Christian Life (1534), from Pico della Mirandola
- The Education or Bringing up of Children (c. 1535), from Plutarch
- Howe one may Take Profite of His Enymes (1535), from the same author is generally attributed to him.
- The Image of Governance Compiled of the Actes and Sentences Notable, of the Moste Noble Emperour Alexander Severus (1541), from Aelius Lampridius

He also wrote:

- The Boke Named the Governour (1531)
- The Knowledge which Maketh a Wise Man and Pasquyll the Playne (1533)
- The Bankette of Sapience (1534), a collection of moral sayings
- The Castel of Helth (1536)
- The Dictionary of Syr Thomas Eliot knyght (1538). Enlarged second edition, 1542; reprinted 1545
- The Defence of Good Women (1540), a eulogy of Anne of Cleves, disguised as a biography of Queen Zenobia of Palmyra.
- Preservative agaynste Deth (1545), which contains many quotations from the Church Fathers

== Notes ==
Political offices
Preceded by Sir William Barentyne	High Sheriff of Berkshire and Oxfordshire; 1527–1528	Succeeded by Sir Simon Harcourt
