= Bible translations into Serbian =

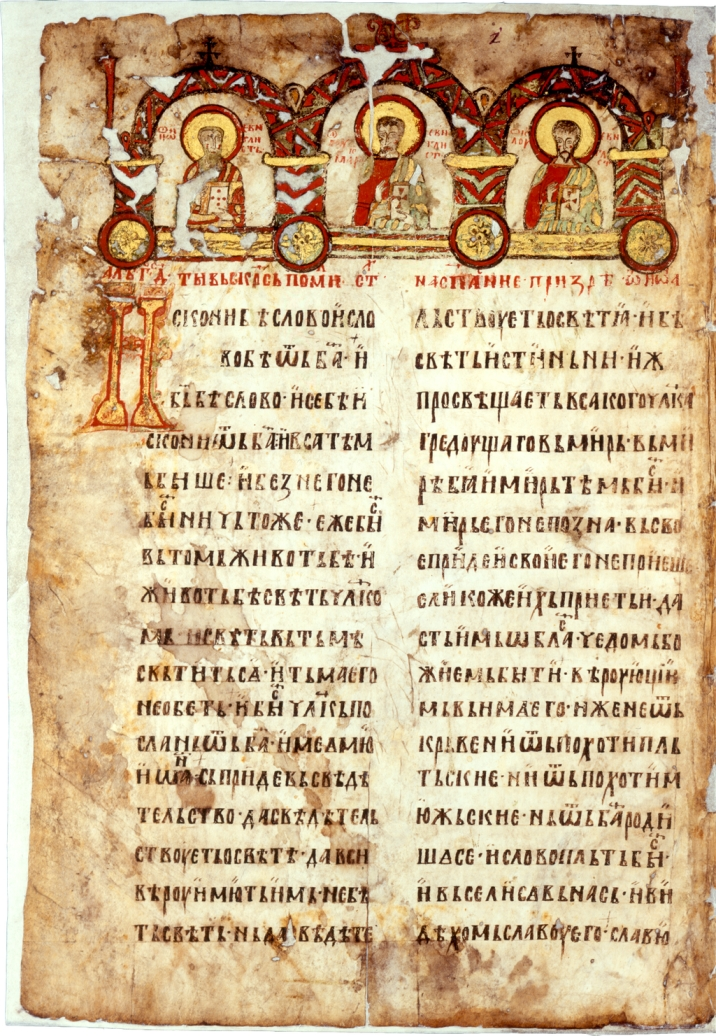
Miroslav Gospel, a 12th Serbian illuminated manuscript Gospel Book

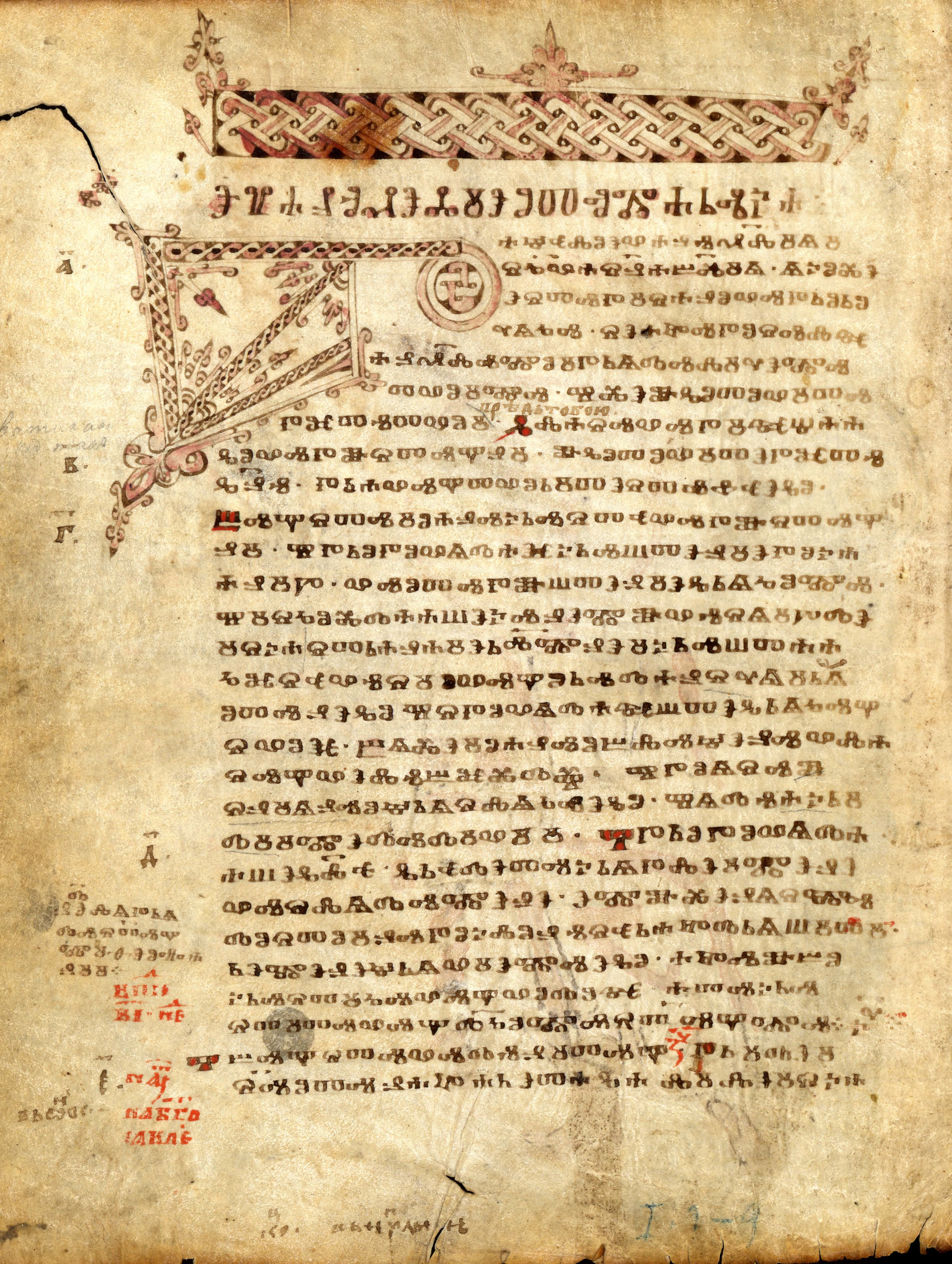
Codex Marianus, a 11th Serbian recension of Church Slavonic illuminated manuscript Gospel Book

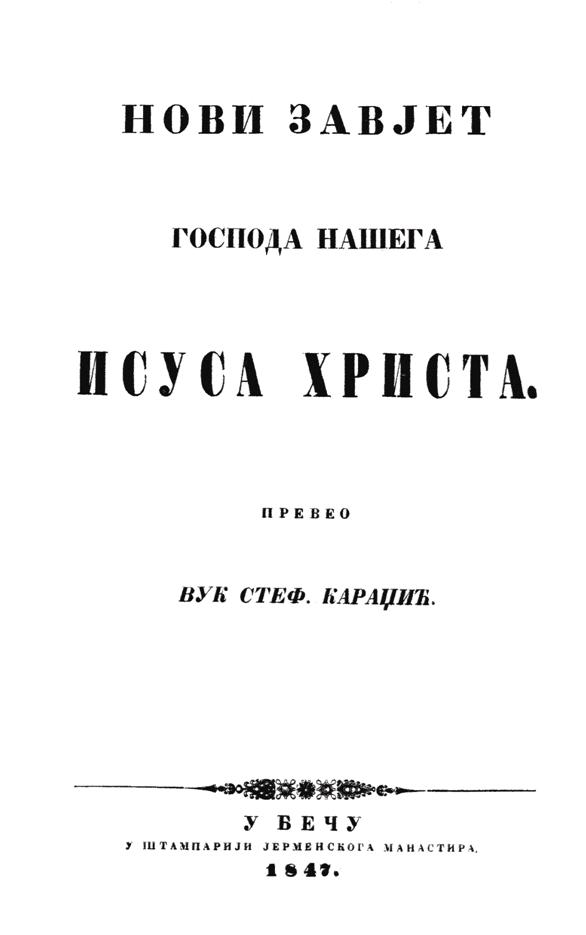
Front page of the Vuk Stefanović Karadžić's translation of the New Testament, 1847

Bible translations into Serbian started to appear in fragments in the 11th century. Efforts to make a complete translation started in the 16th century. The first published complete translations were made in the 19th century.

== History ==
Among first translations in Serbian are the famous Codex Marianus (written in Glagolitic script) from 11th century, and Miroslav Gospel (written in Cyrillic script) from 12th century.

In 1561 South Slavic Bible Institute was established for publishing Protestant books translated to South Slavic languages. For this task, the president of this institute Primož Trubar engaged Stjepan Konzul Istranin and Antun Dalmatin as translators for Serbian. The Cyrillic text was the responsibility of Antun Dalmatin. The type for printing the Cyrillic-script texts was cast by craftsmen from Nuremberg. The first attempt to use it failed, and the type had to be reconstructed. In 1561 in Tübingen three small books were printed (including Abecedarium and Catechismus) in the Glagolitic script. The same books were also printed in Ulach in Serbian with the reconstructed Cyrillic type. For a considerable amount of time, the institute tried to employ a certain Dimitrije Serb to help Istranin and Dalmatin, but without success. Eventually, they managed to employ two Serbian Orthodox priests - Jovan Maleševac from Ottoman Bosnia and Matija Popović from Ottoman Serbia.

At the beginning of the 18th century, Gavrilo Stefanović Venclović translated some 20,000 pages of old biblical literature into vernacular Serbian.

The first Serbian gospel was printed in 1537 in the Rujno Monastery printing house, and in Belgrade printing house in 1552, and also in Mrkšina crkva printing house in 1562. Despite the retained archaic forms and vocabulary, these texts were understandable to the people. Meanwhile, the first modern printed Bible was of Atanasije Stojković (published by the Russian Bible Society at Saint Petersburg, 1824) but was not written in the vernacular Serbian, but was a mixture of Church Slavonic and Serbian. Stojković later translated the New Testament to Serbian in 1830. A more popular translation of the New Testament by Vuk Karadžić was published in Vienna in 1847, and was combined with the translation of the Old Testament of 1867 by Đuro Daničić in Belgrade, printed together in 1868.

Other subsequent translations are the following:

- Lujo Bakotić, 1933, complete Bible
- Dimitrije Stefanović, 1934, New Testament
- Emilijan Čarnić, 1973, New Testament; Psalms, 1985.
- Serbian Orthodox Synod, 1984, New Testament
- Aleksandar Birviš, Matthew through John, 1987; Psalms, 1990; Genesis, 2003; Hebrews, 2003; Lamentations, 2005; Isaiah, 2006

== Comparison ==
Translation by	Genesis 1:1–3	John 3:16
Đuro Daničić, linguist (Old Testament in 1867), and Vuk Karadžić, linguist (New Testament in 1847)	У почетку створи Бог небо и земљу. А земља беше без обличја и пуста, и беше тама над безданом; и дух Божји дизаше се над водом. И рече Бог: Нека буде светлост. И би светлост.	Јер Богу тако омиље свијет да је и сина својега јединороднога дао, да ни један који га вјерује не погине, него да има живот вјечни.
Lujo Bakotić, lexicographer (in 1933)	У почетку створи Бог небо и земљу. Земља беше пуста и празна; над безданом беше тама, и дух Божји лебдијаше над водама. Бог рече: Нека буде светлост. И би светлост.	Јер Бог толико љуби свет, да је и Сина свога јединорођенога дао, да ни један који у њега верује не пропадне, него да има живот вечни.
Dimitrije Stefanović, Serbian Orthodox priest (in 1934)	New Testament only	Јер је Бог тако заволео свет, да је и Сина свога јединорођенога дао, да ниједан који верује у њега, не погине, него да има живот вечни.
Emilijan Čarnić, Serbian Orthodox theologian (in 1973)	New Testament only	Јер Бог је тако заволео свет да је свог јединородног Сина дао, да сваки - ко верује у њега - не пропадне, него да има вечни живот.
Serbian Orthodox Synod (in 1984)	New Testament only	Јер Бог тако завоље свијет да је Сина својега Јединороднога дао, да сваки који вјерује у њега не погине, него да има живот вјечни.

== See also ==
- Slavic translations of the Bible

== Sources ==
- Lubotsky, Alexander; Schaeken, J.; Wiedenhof, Jeroen (1 January 2008). Evidence and Counter-evidence: Balto-Slavic and Indo-European linguistics. Rodopi. ISBN 90-420-2470-4.
- Društvo (1972). Bibliotekar. Društvo bibliotekara N.R. Srbije.
- Sakcinski, Ivan Kukuljević (1886). Glasoviti hrvati proslih vjekova: niz zivotopisa. Naklada "Matice hrvatske".
- Breyer, Mirko (1952). O starim i rijetkim jugoslavenskim knjigama: bibliografsko-bibliofilski prikaz. Izdavački zavod Jugoslavenske akademije znanosti i umjetnosti.
- Balkanologie (1977). Zeitschrift für Balkanologie. R. Trofenik.
- Матица (1976). Review of Slavic studies. Matica srpska.
