= 1550 in literature =

This article contains information about the literary events and publications of 1550.

== Events ==
- June – Robert Estienne leaves Paris for Geneva, where he sets up a printing press.
- July 17 – In England, King Edward VI gives Humphrey Powell a grant to start printing in Ireland.
- unknown dates
  - The first book in Slovene, Catechismus, is written by Protestant reformer Primož Trubar and printed in Schwäbisch Hall, Holy Roman Empire, followed by his Abecedarium.
  - Nostradamus' first almanac is printed.
  - The Chinese shenmo fantasy novel Fengshen Yanyi is first published in book form.

== New books ==
=== Prose ===
- Leandro Alberti – Istoria di Bologna
- Martin Bucer – De regno Christi
- Thomas Cranmer – Defence of the True and Catholic Doctrine of the Sacrament of the Body and Blood of Christ
- Doddayya – Chandraprabha Purana
- Louis Maigret – Traité de la Grammaire française (the first grammatical description of French)
- Ramamatya – Svaramelakalanidhi (treatise on music)
- Richard Sherry – A Treatise of Schemes and Tropes
- Primož Trubar
  - Catechismus
  - Abecedarium
- The Facetious Nights of Straparola (the first European storybook of fairy tales)
- Giorgio Vasari – Lives of the Most Excellent Painters, Sculptors, and Architects
- Rosary of the Philosophers

=== Drama ===
- Thomas Naogeorgus – Agricultura sacra
- Hans Sachs
  - Der fahrende Schüler im Paradies
  - Das Wildbad

=== Poetry ===
- See 1550 in poetry

== Births ==
- December 22 – Cesare Cremonini, Italian philosopher (died 1631)
- unknown dates
  - Wacker von Wackenfels, German diplomat, scholar and author (died 1619)
  - Zang Maoxun, Chinese playwright (died 1620)
- Probable year of birth – Philip Henslowe, Elizabethan theatrical entrepreneur and impresario (died 1616)

== Deaths ==
- February – Marcantonio Flaminio, Latin-language poet (born c. 1498)
- July 9 (probable date) – Jacopo Bonfadio, Italian historian, executed for sodomy (born c. 1508)
- December 8 – Gian Giorgio Trissino, Italian poet, dramatist and grammarian (born 1478)
- unknown date
  - Eguinaire Baron, French legal writer (born 1495)
  - William Lamb alias Paniter, Scottish writer, cleric and lawyer (born c. 1493)
