= Juraj Juričić =

Croatian Protestant preacher and translator

- Born: 16th century Vinodol, Habsburg monarchy (now Croatia)
- Died: October 26, 1578; Ljubljana, Habsburg monarchy (now Slovenia)
- Known for: Protestant preacher

Juraj Juričić (? – October 26, 1578; Slovene: Jurij Juričič, first name also spelled Jur, Jurj, Gjuro, Jurai, Georg, surname also spelled Jurischitsch, Jureschitsch, Jereschitz), was a Croatian Protestant preacher and translator. Born in Croatia, Juričić translated and wrote in German, Slovenian and Croatian. In his Slovenian translations there are many elements of Croatian.

Juričić was born in Vinodol, Croatia. He arrived in Ljubljana c. 1560. As early as 1547 he preached in Kamnik "in the spirit of Protestantism," and later in Ljubljana, where he joined the Reformation. In 1561, he was forbidden to preach in the church of the Teutonic knights. In 1561 or 1562 he replaced Primož Trubar in the Ljubljana Evangelical Church of St. Elizabeth. At about this time he married. He was married by Tulščak.

He probably stayed for a while in Vinodol after he was again forbidden to preach. From 1562 to 1563 he worked as a proofreader and translator at the South Slavic Bible Institute in Urach. In 1563 he returned to serve in Kamnik, while at the same time continuing his activity as a translator. In 1564, he was expelled from Kamnik by the provincial prince. In 1565 he became the second preacher and deacon in Ljubljana; in 1574 a military chaplain. He translated the first 30 chapters of the Pentateuch, which were entrusted to editor Juraj Cvečić. He collaborated with Antun Dalmatin, Stjepan Konzul Istranin and Cvečić to the translation of works Beneficium Christi – Govorenje vele prudno (Tübingen, 1563), the second part of the New Testament (Tübingen, 1563), Edna kratka summa nikih prodik’ od’ tuče i od’ čarnic (Tübingen 1563 ) and Crikveni ordinalic (Tübingen 1564), for which he wrote a preface in German. He published his Postilla (Ljubljana 1578) in Slovene, translating the second and third parts himself. His translation of Spangenberg was reviewed and approved by Adam Bohorič.

Together with Matija Klombner, in 1563 he edited the hymnal Ene duhovne pejsni (Spiritual Songs), in which, in addition to hymns by Primož Trubar and translated German songs and psalms, including the first psalms translated into Slovene, he added eight of his spiritual and church songs. Some of these poems reportedly were anti-Catholic. He did this without Trubar's knowledge, and was criticized for his actions and work. He was mockingly nicknamed Kobila ("mare") by his opponents. The origins and nature of this nickname are not clear, it might date back to before he joined the Protestants. However, the nickname was hijacked and maliciously interpreted and disseminated by counter-reformers and later Slovenian writers.

Unrelated events of the lives of other reformers were associated with him in the Slovenian folklore, in which a character is called Kobila. Josip Jurčič, a Slovenian author, wrote the short story Jurij Kobila (Slovenska vila. Ljubljana 1865), in which he narrates of the lives of two families intertwined in love and hate; and where Juraj winds up murdered after refusing to reconvert to Catholicism.

Juričić died in Ljubljana on October 26, 1578.

== See also ==
- List of Glagolitic books

== Sources ==
- Miroslav Premrou (m. p.). 1892. Jurij Juričić. Ljubljanski zvon 12(12): 732–738.
- Franjo Bučar. 1910. Povijest hrvatske protestantske književnosti za reformacije. Zagreb: Matica Hrvatska.
- France Kidrič. 1920. Jurij Kobila. Časopis za slovenski jezik, književnost in zgodovino 2(1): 276–281.
- Anton Svetina. 1952. Protestantizem pri Slovencih: kulturnozgodovinske slike. In: Drugi Trubarjev zbornik: ob štiristoletnici slovenske knjige, pp. 164–165. Ljubljana: Slovenska matica.
- Krešimir Georgijević. 1969. Hrvatska književnost od XVI do XVIII stoljeća u sjevernoj Hrvatskoj. Zagreb: Matica hrvatska.
- Marin Franičević. 1974. Razdoblje renesansne književnosti. In: Povijest hrvatske književnosti, vol. 3, pp. 7–174. Zagreb: Liber.
- Zvonimir Bartolić. 1998. Sjevernohrvatske teme 5: studije i rasprave. Čakovec: Matica hrvatska.
