= Miodrag =

- Pronunciation: Serbian pronunciation: [mîodraɡ]
- Gender: male

Origin
- Origin: Slavic
- Region of origin: Serbia

Other names
- Related names: Dragomir

Miodrag (Serbian Cyrillic: Миодраг) is a South Slavic, for all purposes almost exclusively Serbian, masculine given name, derived from mio ("tender, cute") and drag ("dear, precious"), both common in Slavonic dithematic names.

== Notable people with the name ==
=== A-J ===
- Miodrag Aksentijević (born 1983), Serbian futsal player
- Miodrag Anđelković (born 1977), Serbian footballer
- Miodrag Andrić (1943–1989), Serbian actor
- Miodrag B. Protić (1922–2014), Serbian painter
- Miodrag Bajović (born 1959), Montenegrin footballer
- Miodrag Baletić (1948–2021), Montenegrin basketball coach
- Miodrag Belodedici (born 1964), Romanian footballer
- Miodrag "Mike" Belosevic, Canadian professor of immunology
- Miodrag Božović (born 1968), Montenegrin football player and manager
- Miodrag Bulajić (born 1970), Serbian politician
- Miodrag Bulatović (1930–1991), Montenegrin Serb novelist and playwright
- Miodrag Ćirković (born 1965), Serbian footballer
- Miodrag Damjanović (1893–1956), Serbian military general
- Miodrag Đidić (born 1954), Serbian lawyer and politician
- Miodrag Davidović (born 1957), Montenegrin businessman, economist and politician
- Miodrag Dinić (born 1980), Serbian professional basketball player and coach
- Miodrag Đurić (1933–2010), known as Dado, Montenegrin painter, engraver and sculptor
- Miodrag Đurđević (born 1961), Bosnian footballer
- Miodrag Džudović (born 1979), Montenegrin footballer
- Miodrag Gavrilović (born 1973), Serbian politician
- Miodrag Gemović (born 1994), Serbian footballer
- Miodrag Grbić (1901–1969), Serbian archeologist
- Miodrag Gvozdenović (1944–2021), Montenegrin volleyball player
- Miodrag Ibrovac (1885–1973), Serbian literary historian, novelist and professor
- Miodrag "Mile" Isakov (born 1950), Serbian politician, journalist, and diplomat
- Miodrag Ješić (1958–2022), Serbian footballer and football manager
- Miodrag Jovanović (1922–2009), Serbian footballer
- Miodrag Jovanović (born 1977), Serbian footballer
- Miodrag Jovanović (born 1986), Serbian footballer

=== K-P ===
- Miodrag Kadija (born 1962), Montenegrin basketball coach
- Miodrag Karadžić (born 1987), Montenegrin footballer
- Miodrag Knežević (1940–2022), Serbian footballer
- Miodrag Kojadinović (born 1961), Serbian-Canadian writer and researcher
- Miodrag Koljević, Montenegrin diplomat
- Miodrag Kostić (1959–2024), Serbian businessman
- Miodrag “Mile” Kos (1925–2014), Serbian football player and coach
- Miodrag Kovačić (born 1965), Serbian weightlifter
- Miodrag Krivokapić (actor) (born 1949), Serbian actor
- Miodrag Krivokapić (footballer) (born 1959), Montenegrin footballer
- Miodrag Krstović (born 1950), Serbian actor
- Miodrag Kustudić (born 1951), Serbian footballer of Montenegrin origin
- Miodrag Latinović (born 1970), Bosnian footballer
- Miodrag Lazić (1955–2020), Serbian surgeon
- Miodrag Lekić born 1947), Montenegrin political scientist, diplomat and politician
- Miodrag Linta (born 1969), Serbian politician and activist
- Miodrag Majić (born 1969), Serbian legal scholar, judge and author
- Miodrag Marinović (born 1967), Chilean politician
- Miodrag Marić (born 1957), Serbian basketball player
- Miodrag Martać (born 1959), Serbian football player and manager
- Miodrag Medan (born 1970), Bosnian Serb footballer
- Miodrag Mitić (1959–2022), Yugoslav volleyball player
- Miodrag Mitrović (born 1991), Swiss footballer of Bosnian Serb descent
- Miodrag Nikolić (1938–2005), Serbian basketball player and coach
- Miodrag Novaković (1940–2023), Serbian cineast and film pedagogue
- Miodrag Pantelić (born 1973), Serbian football
- Miodrag Pavlović (1928–2014), Serbian poet
- Miodrag Perišić (basketball) (born 1972), Serbian basketball coach
- Miodrag Perišić (1948–2003), Serbian politician
- Miodrag Perović, Montenegrin journalist and professor
- Miodrag Perunović (born 1957), Montenegrin boxer
- Miodrag Petković (born 1948), Serbian mathematician, professor of mathematics
- Miodrag Petrović (footballer) (1946–2017), Yugoslav footballer
- Miodrag Petrović (war artist) (1888–1950), official war artist of the Serbian army during World War I
- Miodrag Petrović Čkalja (1924–2003), Serbian actor and comedian
- Miodrag Pivaš (born 2005), Serbian footballer
- Miodrag Popović (1920-2005), Serbian historian
- Miodrag "Mića" Popović (1923–1996), Serbian painter and filmmaker
- Miodrag Purković (1907–1976), Serbian historian

=== R-Z ===
- Miodrag Radanović (born 1947), Serbian football manager
- Miodrag Radovanović (1929–2019), Serbian actor
- Miodrag Radović (born 1957), Yugoslav footballer
- Miodrag Radulovacki (1933–2014), Serbian-American scientist
- Miodrag Radulović (born 1967), Montenegrin football player and manager
- Miodrag Rajičić (1898—1977), Serbian historian
- Miodrag Rajković (born 1971), Serbian professional basketball coach
- Miodrag Rakić (1975–2014), Serbian politician
- Miodrag Ražnatović (born 1966), Serbian lawyer and sports agent
- Miodrag Simović (born 1952), Bosnian judge
- Miodrag Škrbić (born 1956), Serbian entrepreneur
- Miodrag Stefanović (basketball) (1922–1998), Serbian basketball player and coach
- Miodrag Stefanović (footballer, born 1977), Serbian former footballer
- Miodrag Stojanović (1950–2001), Montenegrin boxer
- Miodrag Stojković (born 1964), Serbian researcher in genetics
- Miodrag Stošić (born 1981), Serbian footballer
- Miodrag Todorović (born 1995), Serbian footballer
- Miodrag Todorčević (born 1940), Serbian-French chess master and coach
- Miodrag Todosijević (1941–1982), Serbian high jumper
- Miodrag Tomić (1888–1962), Serbian fighter pilot
- Miodrag Vesković (born 1950), Serbian basketball coach
- Miodrag Vlahović (politician, born 1961) (born 1961), Montenegrin politician
- Miodrag Vlahović (politician, born 1924) (1924–2006), President of the Presidency of the Socialist Republic of Montenegro 1984 to 1985
- Miodrag Vukotić (born 1973), Montenegrin footballer
- Miodrag Zec (born 1982), Montenegrin footballer
- Miodrag Živaljević (born 1951), Serbian footballer
- Miodrag Živković (politician) (born 1957), Montenegrin politician
- Miodrag Živković (sculptor) (1928–2020), Serbian sculptor and university professor

== See also ==
- Dragomir
