= Juraj Cvečić =

Istrian Croatian translator, preacher and editor

- Born: 1520; Pazin, Holy Roman Empire
- Died: 1585 (aged 65); Ljubljana, Carniola, Holy Roman Empire
- Occupations: Translator, editor, Protestant preacher

Juraj Cvečić (also Cvecich, Cuetschisch, Cvetic, Zwetzitsch) (c. 1520 – 1585) was an Istrian Croatian translator, preacher and editor of Protestant books.

He was born in Pazin, Istria, around 1502. At the urging of Matija Vlačić Ilirik (Flacius) her moved to Wittenberg to study theology. He was ordained a priest, and after his ordination served in his native Istria. He was a supporter of Protestantism. He started to seek associates for a printing press in Urach.

After he married in 1561, he was dismissed from the priesthood.

He traveled to Carniola, stayed briefly in Metlika and Ljubljana, where at the urging of Matija Klombner and Francesco (Franjo) Barbo he started to translate theological texts into Croatian. He was twice a resident in Urach (1561 and 1562) and worked in Ungnad's printing house, where books in Croatian were printed. At this time he translated into Croatian the Augsburg Confession and Spangenberg's Postil.

Cvečić, like Konzul Istrianin and Antun Dalmatin (who like nearly all Croatian Protestants were originally from Istria and the Kvarner), wrote in the Chakavian dialect of Istria and the Croatian littoral.

He moved to Carniola with Stjepan Konzul Istranin, and thence to Istria and Cres, where he created a network of collaborators, translators and preachers ready to distribute the Croatian bibles. He traveled throughout Croatia and Carniola, and for some time remained in Istria, where he translated the Acts of the Apostles into Croatian. Sources from the archives in Tübingen relating to Ungnad's printing house in Urach give enough information about his work. After the closure of the printing house in Urach in 1565, Cvečić was a Protestant preacher in several places in Slovenia (Senožeče near Sežana; Idrija). The exact place and date of death are unknown. He was buried in Ljubljana.

Cvečić and his work have "remained in the shadow of Konzul Istrianin's and Primož Trubar's," so he is far less known.
