= Matija Popović =

- Born: Ottoman Bosnia, Ottoman Empire
- Died: 1563; Žumberak, Habsburg monarchy
- Occupations: Serbian Orthodox priest, translator and printer

Matija Popović (c. 1490–1563) was a 16th-century Serbian Orthodox priest from Ottoman Bosnia. Popović was a printer in the South Slavic Bible Institute.

== Scribe ==
Popović transcribed books written in Slavonic-Serbian language.

== Printer at the South Slavic Bible Institute ==
The South Slavic Bible Institute (German: Südslawische Bibelanstalt) was established in Urach (modern-day Bad Urach) in January 1561 by Baron Hans von Ungnad, who was its owner and patron. Ungnad was supported by Christoph, Duke of Württemberg, who allowed Ungnad to use his castle (former convent) of Amandenhof near Urach as a seat of this institute.

Within the institute, Ungnad set up a press which he referred to as "the Slovene, Croatian and Cyrillic press" (German: Windische, Chrabatische und Cirulische Trukherey). The manager and supervisor of the institute was Primož Trubar. The books they printed at this press were planned to be used throughout the entire territory populated by South Slavs between the Soča River, the Black Sea, and Constantinople. Trubar had idea to use their books to spread Protestantism among Croats and other South Slavs. For this task, Trubar engaged Stjepan Konzul Istranin and Antun Dalmatin as translators for Croatian and Serbian.

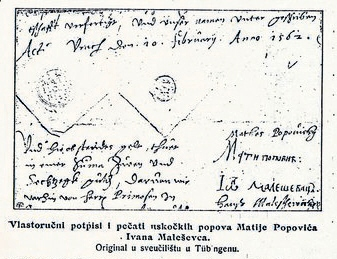
1562 receipt signed by Jovan Maleševac and Matija Popović

Language used by Dalmatin and Istranin was based on northern-Chakavian dialect with elements of Shtokavian and Ikavian. People from the institute, including Trubar, were not satisfied with translations of Dalmatin and Istranin. Trubar and two of them exchanged heated correspondence about correctness of the language two of them used even before the first edition translated by Dalmatin and Istranin was published and immediately after it. For long time the institute tried to engage certain Dimitrije Serb to help Istranin and Dalmatin, but without success. Eventually, they managed to engage two Serbian Orthodox priests, Jovan Maleševac from Ottoman Bosnia and Matija Popović from Ottoman Serbia. Two of them came to Urach on 20 September 1561. They confirmed that the prepared Cyrillic versions of the New Testament, Catechesis and other books were satisfactory. Because two of them were not skilled in typography, Ungnad sent them back to Ljubljana and gave a horse and 40 forints to each of them.

In 1562 Popović signed with ћ at the end of his signature, which is the same letter introduced by Vuk Karadžić at the beginning of the 19th century. At the beginning of 1563 Popović was killed in Žumberak by another Orthodox priest.

== Sources ==
- Society (1990). Slovene Studies: Journal of the Society for Slovene Studies. The Society.
- Črnja, Zvane (1978). Kulturna povijest Hrvatske: Temelji. Otokar Keršovani.
- Betz, Hans Dieter (30 June 2007). Religion past and present. Brill.
- Klaić, Vjekoslav (1974). Povijest Hrvatâ od najstarijih vremena de svršetka XIX stoljeća. Matica hrvatska.
- Breyer, Mirko (1952). O starim i rijetkim jugoslavenskim knjigama: bibliografsko-bibliofilski prikaz. Izdavački zavod Jugoslavenske akademije znanosti i umjetnosti.
- Lubotsky, Alexander; Schaeken, J.; Wiedenhof, Jeroen (1 January 2008). Evidence and Counter-evidence: Balto-Slavic and Indo-European linguistics. Rodopi. ISBN 90-420-2470-4.
- Матица (1976). Review of Slavic studies. Matica srpska.
- štamparija (1922). Prilozi za književnost, jezik, istoriju i folklor. Drzhavna štamparija Kralevine srba, khrbata i slovent︠s︡a.
- Mošin, Vladimir A.; Pop-Atanasov, Ǵorgi (2002). Izbrani dela. Menora.
- Đorđić, Petar (1987). Istorija srpske ćirilice. Zavod za udžbenike i nastavna sredstva.
- Matica (1976). Review of Slavic studies. Matica srpska.
- Marković, Božidar; Furunović, Dragutin; Radić, Radiša (2000). Zbornik radova: kultura štampe--pouzdan vidik prošlog, sadašnjeg i budućeg : Prosveta-Niš 1925-2000. Prosveta.
- Milić, Danica (1976). Simpozijum oslobodilacki pokreti jugoslovenskih naroda od XVI veka do pocetka Prvog Svetskog Rata. Branko Bajid.
- Milovančev, Nikola (1998). Etnički odnosi Srba sa drugim narodima i etničkim zajednicama. Etnografski institut SANU.
