= Miodrag Jovanović =

Miodrag Jovanović may refer to:

- Miodrag Jovanović (footballer, born 1922), Serbian footballer
- Miodrag Jovanović (footballer, born 1977), Serbian footballer
- Miodrag Jovanović (footballer, born 1986), Serbian footballer
- Miodrag Jovanović (basketball) for KK Bor
