= Miodrag Škrbić =

Serbian entrepreneur and former football player

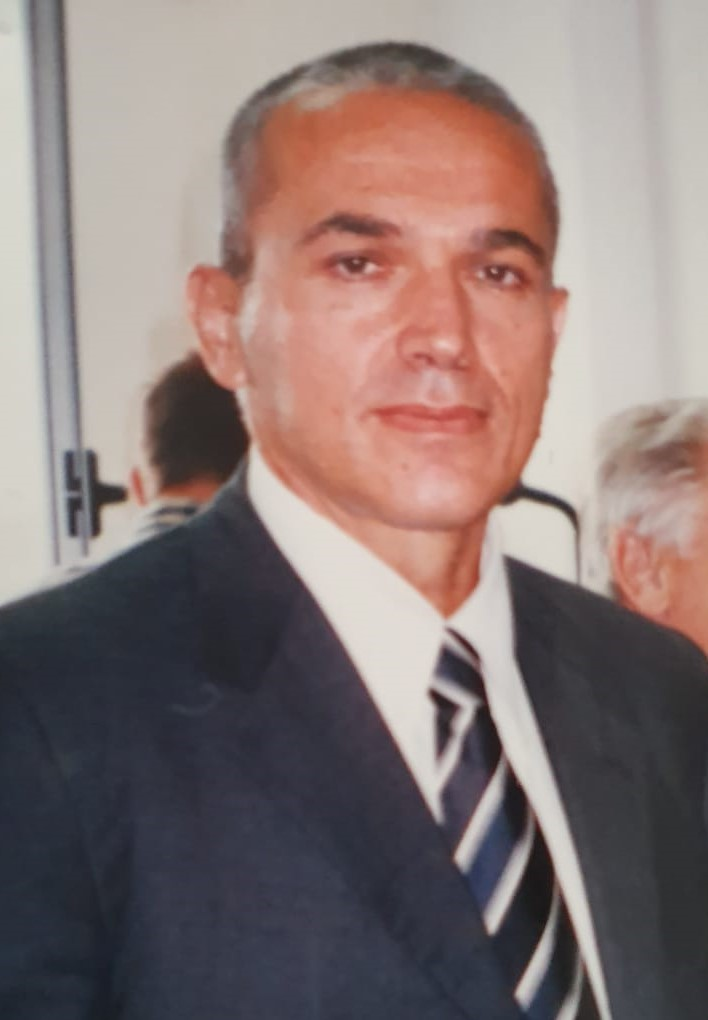
- Miodrag Skrbic, Chairman of BoD of NITES Group
- Born: 20 January 1956 (age 69); Hotkovci, SFR Yugoslavia
- Education: Master of Electrical Engineering
- Occupation: Entrepreneur
- Organization: NITES Group

Miodrag Škrbić (Serbian Cyrillic Миодраг Шкрбић; born in Hotkovci, January 20, 1956) is a Serbian entrepreneur and former football player.

== Education ==
Škrbić attended the "Ognjen Prica" high school in Sarajevo and graduated as a student of IV-2 class. This class was declared the best in the former Yugoslavia and Miodrag Škrbić the best student.

Škrbić holds a master's degree from the Faculty of Electrical Engineering in Sarajevo, at the Department of Informatics, and basic graduate studies ended in 1978 at the Telecommunications Section.

== Sports career ==
In his early youth, he was professionally involved in football. In 1973–74, he was a first team player of FC Željezničar from Sarajevo. In 1973 he joined the Yugoslav youth team of coach Ante Mladinić in a generation with Zajec, Vujkov, Kranjcar, Pavković, Vlah and Mustedanagić. He dropped out of his playing career during his studies but returned to football as a graduate engineer in 1978–1982, when he played for FK Famos Hrasnica.

From 1987 to 1989 he was a football referee in the First Federal League of Yugoslavia.

== Professional career ==
Škrbić is one of the first private entrepreneurs from the former Yugoslavia.

He founded the first partner company "Grad" in 1989 in Sarajevo. In the early 1990s, after the outbreak of war, Škrbić went to Germany and took over Ned Electronics, as one of the partners.

After opening of Eastern European countries in 1993, Škrbić moves to Czech Republic where, with the participation of company Tesla Votice, establishes company specialized in information technology in the field telecommunications – Strom Telecom, together with Nihad Hurem and Mirko Jelcic. Following the successful start-up of the company, Strom Telecom acquires a stake of Tesla Votice and the Tesla Votice plant itself, thereby establishing the most famous Prague telecommunications company. In the late 1990s and early 2000s, company expanded its operations to Russia and to the countries of the former Soviet Union, Germany and Central Europe, and Africa. At the Geneva Fair in 2003, Strom Telecom entered the US market for the first time and signed a contract for the delivery of its own digital communication systems.

In February 2007, Strom Telecom, together with Sitronics TS Holding (part of AFK SYSTEM), successfully entered the London Stock Exchange, thereby opening access to international capital. Strom Telecom then begins cooperation with AFK SYSTEM, which at the end of 2007 acquires Strom Telecom and merges it with Sitronics TS, which later changed its name to NVision.

After the successful transfer of ownership of Strom Telecom, he founded several smaller companies in several European countries, of which in the period from 2007 to 2011 through consolidation, a business system was created under the name NITES Group, which operates successfully in Central and Southeast Europe.

== Corporate social responsibility ==
Throughout his entrepreneurial career, Škrbić has made an effort to create educational opportunities for young people through funding their higher education and at prestigious European universities and their subsequent employment within the NITES Group. In addition to his education, Škrbić also provides professional placements for students at NITES Group companies.

Admiring the great scientist Nikola Tesla, Škrbić, in association with the civil society organization "Luka Praha" endorsed the translation and promotion of the novel "Tesla, a portrait of a masked mask" by Vladimir Pistal, winner of the NIN journal Award.
