= Hans von Ungnad =

Austrian statesman and printer

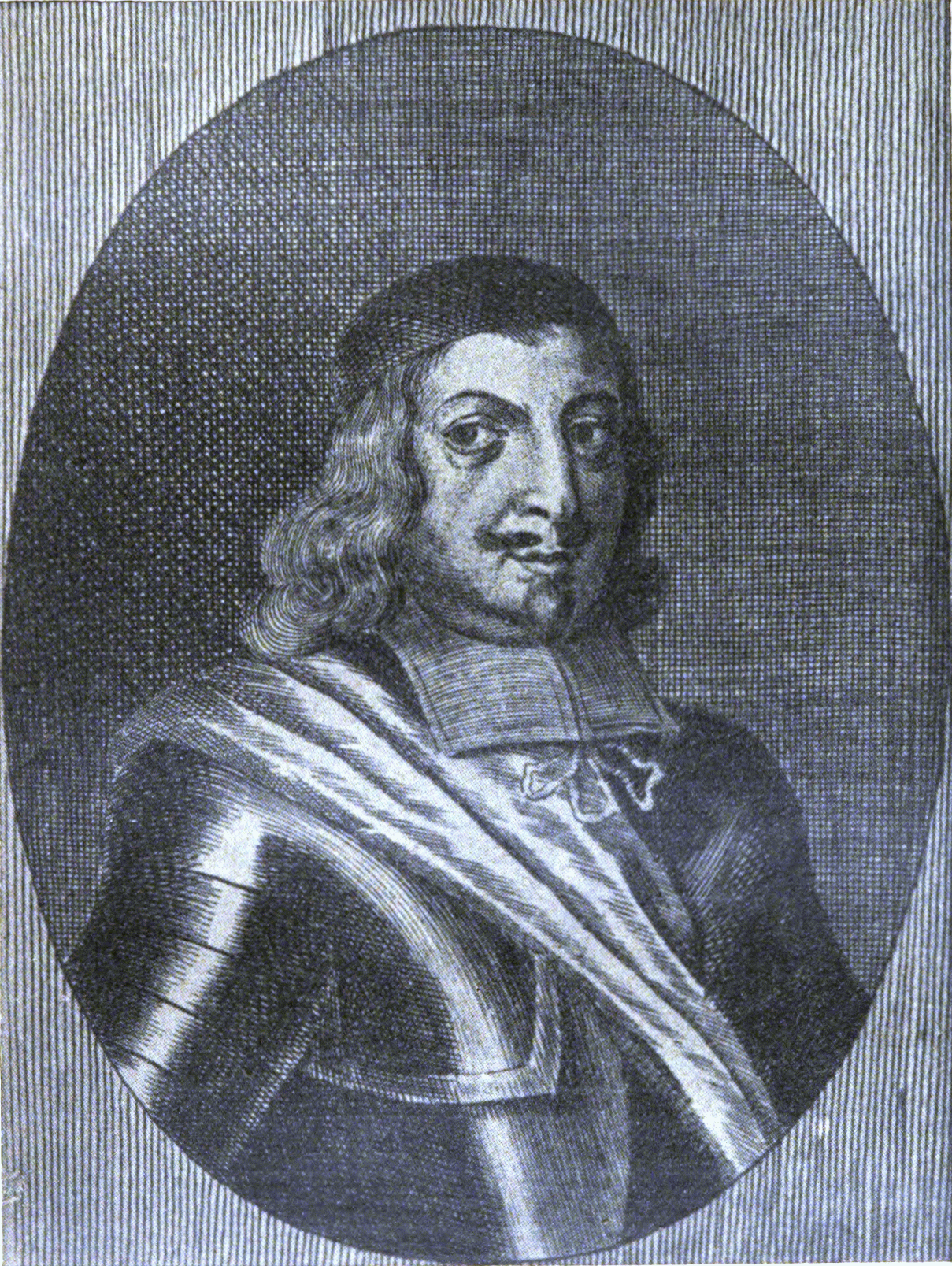
- Born: November 19, 1493
- Died: December 27, 1564 (aged 71)
- Other name: Ivan Ungnad
- Occupation: 16th-century Habsburg nobleman

Hans von Ungnad (1493–1564) was 16th-century Habsburg nobleman who was best known as founder of the South Slavic Bible Institute established to publish Protestant books translated to South Slavic languages.

== Military career ==
In 1540 Ungnad had been appointed on the position of Captain General of Lower Austria (modern-day Slovenia), Croatia and other Habsburg estates. The main threat to the territory he was responsible for was the Ottoman Empire and its forces in Ottoman Bosnia. He believed that the best way to confront it was to spread the Protestantism to the very gates of Istanbul. In 1555 he refused to execute anti-Protestant measures requested by Ferdinand I, resigned his position and opted for voluntary exile in Germany.

== South Slavic Bible Institute ==
The South Slavic Bible Institute (German: Südslawische Bibelanstalt) was established in Urach (modern-day Bad Urach in Germany) in January 1561. Baron Ungnad was its owner and patron. Ungnad was supported by Christoph, Duke of Württemberg, who allowed Ungnad to use his castle (former convent) of Amandenhof near Urach as a seat of this institute.

Baron Ungnad was interested in Protestant proselytism propagated by Primož Trubar and attended the session of German theologians held in Tübingen in 1561. At that occasion Ungnad, probably instructed by Duke Christoph, agreed that he would take responsibility for publishing Slavic books.

Within the institute, Ungnad set up a press which he referred to as "the Slovene, Croatian and Cyrillic press" (German: Windische, Chrabatische und Cirulische Trukherey). The manager and supervisor of the institute was Primož Trubar. The books they printed at this press were planned to be used throughout the entire territory populated by South Slavs between the Soča River, the Black Sea, and Constantinople. Until 1565 were published thirty titles with over 30,000 copies. Today exist only 300 books. Translations of Bible texts were inspired by glagolitic tradition. Thirteen books were printed in glagolitic, nine in Latin, and eight in Cyrillic script. Trubar had idea to use their books to spread Protestantism among Croats and other South Slavs and even among Muslims in Turkey. For this task, Trubar engaged Stjepan Konzul Istranin and Antun Dalmatin as translators for Croatian and Serbian.

== Sources ==
- Society (1990). Slovene Studies: Journal of the Society for Slovene Studies. The Society.
- Bergendoff, Conrad John Immanuel (1957). The Lutheran Quarterly. Editorial Council of Lutheran Theological Seminaries.
- Betz, Hans Dieter (30 June 2007). Religion past and present. Brill.
- Breyer, Mirko (1952). O starim i rijetkim jugoslavenskim knjigama: bibliografsko-bibliofilski prikaz. Izdavački zavod Jugoslavenske akademije znanosti i umjetnosti.
- Črnja, Zvane (1978). Kulturna povijest Hrvatske: Temelji. Otokar Keršovani.
- Dvornik, Francis (1962). The Slavs in European History and Civilization. Rutgers University Press. p. 420. ISBN 978-0-8135-0799-6.
- Klaić, Vjekoslav (1974). Povijest Hrvatâ od najstarijih vremena de svršetka XIX stoljeća. Matica hrvatska.
- Lubotsky, Alexander; Schaeken, J.; Wiedenhof, Jeroen (1 January 2008). Evidence and Counter-evidence: Balto-Slavic and Indo-European linguistics. Rodopi. ISBN 90-420-2470-4.
- Review (1988). The Slavonic and East European review.
- Rotar, Janez (1988). Trubar in Južni Slovani. Državna zal. Slovenije.
- Vorndran, Rolf (1977). Südslawische Reformationsdrucke in der Universitätsbibliothek Tübingen: e. Beschreibung d. vorhandenen glagolit., kyrill. u. a. Drucke d. Uracher Bibelanst. Franz Steiner Verlag. ISBN 978-3-16-939761-7.
- Werner Raupp (Ed.): Mission in Quellentexten. Geschichte der Deutschen Evangelischen Mission von der Reformation bis zur Weltmissionskonferenz Edinburgh 1910, Erlangen/Bad Liebenzell 1990 (ISBN 3-87214-238-0 / 3-88002-424-3), S. 49-50 (a) Primož Trubar: Vorrede vom 12. Januar 1562 von: Der erst halb Theil des newen Testaments, Tübingen 1562 [glagolitisch], S. cij-ciij; b) Hans III. Ungnad von Weißenwolff: Rundschreiben an die deutschen Churfürsten und Fürsten vom 14. September 1561, Original in: Universitätsarchiv Tübingen).
