= Abecedarium (Trubar) =

1550 book in Slovene

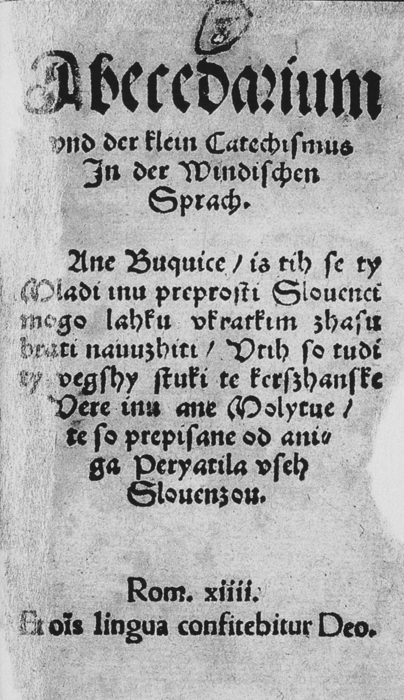
- The front (first) page of the first edition
- Author: Primož Trubar
- Language: Slovene
- Genre: primer
- Published: 1550 by Peter Frentz
- Publication place: Holy Roman Empire
- Pages: 8 leaves

Abecedarium (Abecedary)—along with Catechismus (Catechism)—is the first printed book in Slovene. It is an eight-leaf booklet for helping people learn the alphabet. The protestant reformer Primož Trubar had it printed in 1550 in the schwabacher (Gothic script), and reprinted with some corrections in the Latin script in 1555 and 1566. An improved version of it was also printed by Sebastjan Krelj in 1566. Both Abecedarium and Catechismus are significant in the development of Slovene.

== History ==
Although it was for decades assumed that Catechismus was printed in Tübingen, new research has shown that it was most probably printed in 1550 by Peter Frentz in Schwäbisch Hall.

== Modern edition ==
Abecedarium was published in October 2008 for the first time in modern Slovene. This scholarly edition includes both the Trubar-era Slovene and a translation into modern Slovene with scholarly notes. Similarly, Catechismus was published in October 2009, the other "first" Slovene book. The "Pridiga o veri" (Sermon on Faith) from Catechismus is available in Slovene, English, German, and Esperanto.

== See also ==
- Abecedarium
