= Jovan Maleševac =

Serbian Orthodox monk

- Born: Јован Малешевац; Hotkovci north of Glamoč in western Bosnia, then part of the Ottoman Empire
- Occupations: Serbian Orthodox monk and scribe
- Years active: 1524–1562

Jovan Maleševac (Serbian Cyrillic: Јован Малешевац; fl. 1524–1562) was a Serbian Orthodox monk and scribe who collaborated in 1561 with the Slovene Protestant reformer Primož Trubar to print religious books in Cyrillic. Between 1524 and 1546, Maleševac wrote five liturgical books in Church Slavonic at Serbian Orthodox monasteries in Herzegovina and Montenegro. He later settled in the region of White Carniola, in present-day Slovenia. In 1561, he was engaged by Trubar to proof-read Cyrillic Protestant liturgical books produced in the South Slavic Bible Institute in Urach, Germany, where he stayed for five months.

== Scribe in Herzegovina and Montenegro ==
Jovan Maleševac was born in the village of Hotkovci north of Glamoč in western Bosnia, then part of the Ottoman Empire. He became a Serbian Orthodox hieromonk (priest-monk), and was active as a scribe writing liturgical books in Church Slavonic. He wrote a Menaion in 1524 at the Tvrdoš Monastery in Herzegovina and a Gospel Book in 1532 at a monastery in Montenegro. In 1545–46, he wrote a Prolog (a type of Synaxarium), a Typikon, and a Gospel Book at the Holy Trinity Monastery near Pljevlja in Herzegovina. A copy of the first Serbian incunabulum, the Cetinje Octoechos, found in the village of Stekerovci north of Glamoč, contains an updated inscription written by Jovan Maleševac stating that he bought the book "for the health of the living and the memory of the dead". The colophon of the 1524 Menaion begins with Maleševac's remark on the contemporary historical context:

Вь лѣто ҂з҃.л҃.в҃. сьписа се сїа дѹшепользнаа книга, глаголѥмаа минѣи, вь храмѣ ѹспѣнїа пречистиѥ богородице вь Трѣбыню, вь дни злочьстивааго и троици хꙋлнааго и хрїстїанѡм досадителнааго тꙋрчьскааго цара Сѹлѣимена... чьтꙋще или поюще или прѣписꙋюще, аще и бѹдꙋ гдѣ что погрѣшиль, или ѡписал' се нѣдоꙋменїем моим, или по забвѣнїю словѣсь, а вїи вашим добримь ꙋмѡм и наѹченїемь исправлꙗите, понеже бысть брѣн'наа рꙋка, а мѹтнь ѹмь...

— This soul-benefiting book called Menaion was written in the year 7032 (AD 1524) in the Church of the Assumption of the Virgin Mary (at the Tvrdoš Monastery) in Trebinje, in the days of the evil-doer and blasphemer against the Holy Trinity and persecutor of Christians, the Turkish Emperor Suleiman... You who read or chant or transcribe [from this book]—if I made mistakes or misspelt something through my uncertainty or omission of letters, then you, with your good minds and learning, correct, because the hand was of mud and the mind was dim...

== Proofreader in Germany ==
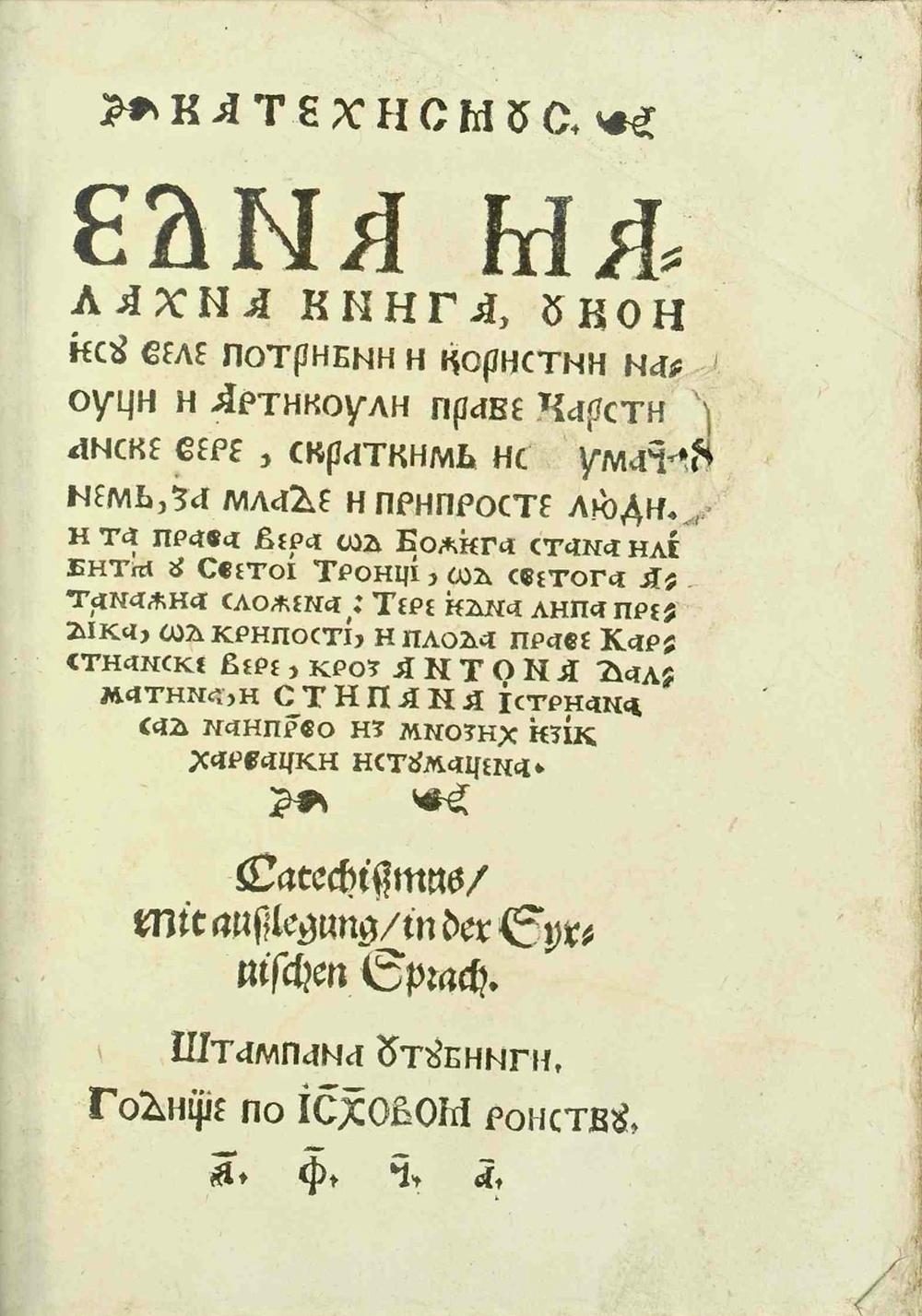
Title page of Luther's Small Catechism in Cyrillic, proof-red by Maleševac in 1561

Maleševac later joined the people who emigrated from the Ottoman-held Bosnia, Herzegovina, and Serbia to neighbouring areas of the Habsburg Empire, and he went to the region of White Carniola (in present-day Slovenia). Before that, he may have been to Venice, as he was in correspondence with a man (possible Vićenco Vuković?) who worked at a Serbian printing house there. In White Carniola, he was contacted in 1561 by Protestant activists associated with the Slovene religious reformer Primož Trubar. By that time, Trubar had printed a number of religious books in Slovene, and he had recently organized a printing press in the South Slavic Bible Institute in Urach near Tübingen, Germany, to produce books in the Glagolitic script. He also intended to print books in Cyrillic, but he was not confident of his Croatian translators' proficiency in that script. For this reason, Trubar and his colleagues negotiated with a Serb named Dimitrije Ljubavić. He had been a secretary of the Ecumenical Patriarch of Constantinople, before he went to Württemberg, where he converted to Protestantism. Dimitrije was willing to help print Cyrillic books, but after he was offered a high position at the Moldavian court, he went to Moldavia instead.

Maleševac accepted the offer of Trubar's colleagues to go to the South Slavic Bible Institute in Urach. He was joined by another hieromonk, Matija Popović, who hailed from Serbia. The Protestants named the two monks as uskokische Priester ("Uskok priests" in German), referring with the term "Uskok" to refugees from the Ottoman Empire. Trubar and colleagues hoped that their Cyrillic books and the Uskok priests would help convert South Slavs in the Ottoman Empire and even Turks to Protestantism. Maleševac and Popović were introduced to Trubar in Ljubljana, from where they travelled together to Urach. They arrived there in September 1561, taking with them a large pack of the monks' books. At the Cyrillic printing press in Urach, Maleševac and Popović proof-read the New Testament, Luther's Small Catechism (German: Catechismus, mit Außlegung, in der Syruischen Sprach), Loci Communes, and other books. As monks, they abstained from meat, so a diet consisting of fish was specially prepared for them. They stayed in Urach for five months, and in February 1562 they returned to Ljubljana. Before they departed, they once more solemnly affirmed that the prepared Cyrillic versions of the New Testament and other books were satisfactory. In his letter to Baron Hans von Ungnad, who was the main patron of the Protestant printing works in Urach, Trubar expressed his satisfaction with the services provided by Maleševac and Popović, though one of his Croatian translators complained about them. Ungnad gave a horse and 40 forints to each of them.

There are no data about Maleševac after 1562. Despite the hopes of Trubar and his associates, their Cyrillic books had no impact on the Serbian people, while Protestantism gained only a small following in Slovenia and Croatia. A copy of the Cyrillic New Testament printed in Urach in 1563 is kept today in the library of the Serbian Orthodox Eparchy of Buda in Sentandreja, Hungary. The activities of Maleševac and Popović in Germany are regarded as an early case of inter-religious cooperation in Bible publication.

== See also ==
- Mavro Orbini
- Primož Trubar
- Johann Weikhard von Valvasor
- Dimitrije Ljubavić
