= Miodrag Koljević =

Montenegrin diplomat

Miodrag Koljević is a former Chargé d'affaires ad interim of Montenegro to Russia.

== See also ==
- Montenegro–Russia relations
