= Antun Dalmatin =

Croatian writer, translator and publisher

Antun Aleksandrović Dalmatin
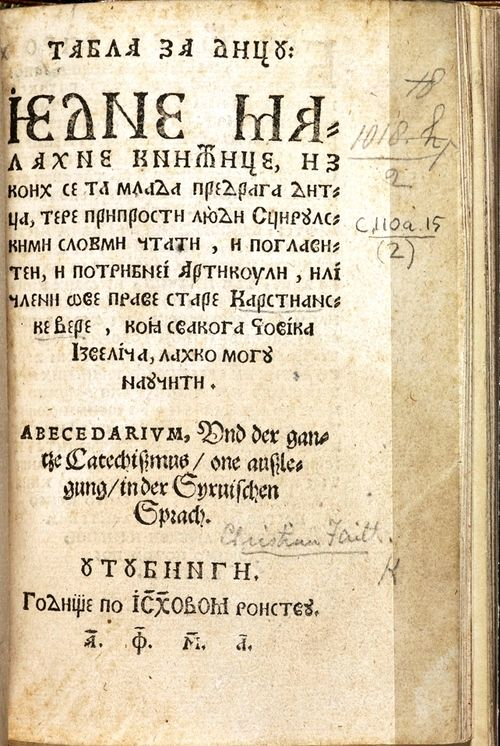
- The first page of 1561 Cyrillic work "Tabla za Dicu", a translation of Primož Trubar's "Primer" by Antun Dalmatin
- Born: probably Senj
- Died: 1597; Ljubljana, Habsburg monarchy
- Other names: Antonius Dalmata ab Alexandro

Antun Aleksandrović Dalmatin (Latin: Antonius Dalmata ab Alexandro; d. 1597) was a 16th-century Croatian translator and publisher of Protestant liturgical books.

== Name and early life ==
Antun's surname is an exonym which means "of Dalmatia". Dalmatin was probably from Senj.

== South Slavic Bible Institute ==
The South Slavic Bible Institute (German: Südslawische Bibelanstalt) was established in Urach (modern-day Bad Urach) in January 1561 by Baron Hans von Ungnad, who was its owner and patron. Within the institute, Ungnad set up a press, which he referred to as "the Slovene, Croatian and Cyrillic press" (German: Windische, Chrabatische und Cirulische Trukherey). The manager and supervisor of the institute was Primož Trubar. They planned to use the books that they printed throughout the entire territory populated by South Slavs between the Soča River, the Black Sea, and Constantinople. For this task, Trubar engaged Stjepan Konzul Istranin and Antun Dalmatin as translators for Croatian and Serbian, and gave Antun Dalmatin the responsibility for the Cyrillic text.

The language used by Dalmatin and Istranin was based on northern-Chakavian dialect with elements of Shtokavian and Ikavian. Members of the institute, including Trubar, were not satisfied with the translations of Dalmatin and Istranin. Trubar and two of them exchanged heated correspondence about correctness of the language two of them used, even before the first edition translated by Dalmatin and Istranin was published and immediately after the publication. For a long time, they tried to engage certain Dimitrije Serb to help them, but without success. Eventually, they managed to engage two Serbian Orthodox priests, Jovan Maleševac from Ottoman Bosnia and Matija Popović from Ottoman Serbia.

== See also ==
- List of Glagolitic books
- Stjepan Konzul Istranin

== Sources ==
- Betz, Hans Dieter (30 June 2007). Religion past and present. Brill.
- Črnja, Zvane (1978). Kulturna povijest Hrvatske: Temelji. Otokar Keršovani.
- Slovene Studies: Journal of the Society for Slovene Studies. The Society. 1990.
- Klaić, Vjekoslav (1974). Povijest Hrvatâ od najstarijih vremena de svršetka XIX stoljeća. Matica hrvatska.
- Lubotsky, Alexander; Schaeken, J.; Wiedenhof, Jeroen (1 January 2008). Evidence and Counter-evidence: Balto-Slavic and Indo-European linguistics. Rodopi. ISBN 978-90-420-2470-0.
- Posset, Franz (2013). Marcus Marulus and the Biblia Latina of 1489: An Approach to His Biblical Hermeneutics. Böhlau Verlag Köln Weimar. ISBN 978-3-412-20756-4.
- The Bible in the World. British and Foreign Bible Society. 1918.
- Библиотекар. Društvo bibliotekara N.R. Srbije. 1972.
- Lipatov, Alexander Vladimirovich (1987). Славянские литературы в процессе становления и развития: от древности до середины XIX века [Slavic Literatures in the Process of Formation and Development: from Antiquity to the Middle of the 19th Century]. Nauka.
- Mošin, Vladimir A.; Pop-Atanasov, Ǵorgi (2002). Izbrani dela. Menora. ISBN 978-608-200-116-6.
- Review of Slavic studies. Matica srpska. 1976.
- Prilozi za književnost, jezik, istoriju i folklor. Državna štamparija Kraljevine Srba, Hrvata i Slovenaca. 1922.
- Marković, Božidar; Furunović, Dragutin; Radić, Radiša (2000). Zbornik radova: kultura štampe--pouzdan vidik prošlog, sadašnjeg i budućeg : Prosveta-Niš 1925-2000. Prosveta.
- Vorndran, Rolf (1977). Südslawische Reformationsdrucke in der Universitätsbibliothek Tübingen: e. Beschreibung d. vorhandenen glagolit., kyrill. u. a. Drucke d. Uracher Bibelanst. Franz Steiner Verlag. ISBN 978-3-16-939761-7.
