= Defence of the True and Catholic Doctrine of the Sacrament of the Body and Blood of Christ =

1550 book by Thomas Cranmer

The Defence of the True and Catholic Doctrine of the Sacrament of the Body and Blood of Christ is a book by Thomas Cranmer, Archbishop of Canterbury. It was published in July 1550, and was Cranmer's first full-length book, but at his trial in September 1555, he said that it had been written seven years earlier, in 1548.

== Purpose ==
Although Cranmer is concerned that "very simple and unlearned people" would understand and be edified by his book, the Defence is largely a polemic work, in which Cranmer attacked the Roman Catholic doctrine of his opponents, particularly Bishop Stephen Gardiner. In the preface he compares "beads, pardons, pilgrimages, and such other like popery" with weeds, but says the roots of the weeds are transubstantiation, the doctrine of the corporeal presence of Christ in the Eucharist, and the sacrificial nature of the Roman Catholic mass.

== Contents ==
The book itself is divided into five parts. Focusing mainly on using arguments based on reason, Cranmer quotes frequently from Scripture and patristic texts, structuring his argument in a lucid manner. Cranmer deals with the following topics:

- The true use of the Lord's Supper (Eucharist)
- The error of transubstantiation
- The nature of Christ's presence in the bread and wine
- The reception of the body and blood of Christ
- The nature of the sacrifice

Cranmer argues that for someone to eat the body and drink the blood of Jesus Christ means for that person to "dwell in Christ and to have Christ dwelling in him." To truly partake in the sacrament requires faith.

Cranmer distinguishes Christ's spiritual presence from his sacramental presence. Avoiding the Lutheran doctrine of Sacramental union, he argues that the spiritual presence occurs only through Christ's divine nature, he being in heaven in regards to his human nature. Alister E. McGrath observes that Cranmer's spiritual reading of the phrase "This is my body", and develops a view "remarkably close to that developed by Zwingli and Oecolampadius."

== Reception ==
During the summer and autumn of 1550, during which Gardiner was in the Tower of London, he wrote a retort which was presented to Cranmer at the conclusion of his trial in 1551. Gardiner was severely critical of Cranmer's arguments and cited a range of sources that he believed supported the doctrine of the corporeal presence of Christ in the elements of the Eucharist. Among these sources, were the Book of Common Prayer, Martin Luther, Cranmer's own catechism, and other Lutheran writers.

At his trial, Cranmer's use of the Church Fathers to further justify the claims he was making from scripture was criticized and brought up as charges against him. He was charged with corrupting their texts and falsifying their meaning by "evil translating."

Geoffrey Bromiley has suggested that in the Defence, Cranmer becomes "so enmeshed in the detailed refutation of a false teaching that he cannot work out the implications of his positive statements."
