= South Slavic Bible Institute =

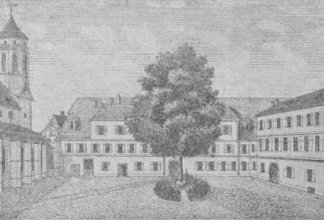
- The seat of the South Slavic Bible Institute: 1910 drawing of the castle (former convent) of Amandenhof
- Founder: Hans von Ungnad
- Established: January 1561
- Mission: to spread Protestantism among all South Slavs through printing liturgical books in Glagolitic, Latin, and Cyrillic script
- President: Primož Trubar
- Staff: Stjepan Konzul Istranin, Antun Dalmatin, Jovan Maleševac and Matija Popović
- Key people: Hans von Ungnad
- Location: former convent of Amandenhof, Urach, Habsburg monarchy
- Dissolved: 1565

The South Slavic Bible Institute (German: Südslawische Bibelanstalt) was established in Urach (modern-day Bad Urach) in January 1561 by Baron Hans von Ungnad, who was its owner and patron. Ungnad was supported by Christoph, Duke of Württemberg, who allowed Ungnad to use his castle (former convent) of Amandenhof near Urach as a seat of this institute.

Baron Ungnad was interested in Protestant proselytism propagated by Primož Trubar and attended the session of German theologians held in Tübingen in 1561. At that occasion Ungnad, probably instructed by Duke Christoph, agreed that he would take responsibility for publishing Slavic books.

Within the institute, Ungnad set up a press which he referred to as "the Slovene, Croatian and Cyrillic press" (German: Windische, Chrabatische und Cirulische Trukherey). The manager and supervisor of the institute was Primož Trubar. The books they printed at this press were planned to be used throughout the entire territory populated by South Slavs between the Soča River, the Black Sea, and Constantinople. Trubar intended to use the books to spread Protestantism among Croats and other South Slavs. He also endeavored to proselytize Muslims in Turkey, even Turkish translations were planned.

For his task, Trubar engaged Stjepan Konzul Istranin and Antun Dalmatin as translators for Croatian and Serbian. The Cyrillic text was the responsibility of Antun Dalmatin. The type for printing the Cyrillic-script texts was cast by craftsmen from Nuremberg. The first attempt to use it failed, and the type had to be reconstructed. In 1561 in Tübingen three small books were printed (including Abecedarium and Catechismus) in Croatian in the Glagolitic script. The same books were also printed in Ulach in Serbian with the reconstructed Cyrillic type. Juraj Juričić worked as a copy reader at the institute from 1562 to 1563.

The language used by Dalmatin and Istranin was based on the northern-Chakavian dialect with elements of Shtokavian and Ikavian. People from the institute, including Trubar, were not satisfied with Dalmatin and Istranin's translations. Trubar admonished the two in heated correspondences about the correctness of the language they used even before the first edition translated by Dalmatin and Istranin was published, and immediately thereafter. For a considerable amount of time, the institute tried to employ a certain Dimitrije Serb to help Istranin and Dalmatin, but without success. Eventually, they managed to employ two Serbian Orthodox priests - Jovan Maleševac from Ottoman Bosnia and Matija Popović from Ottoman Serbia.

The institute and its press were operational until Ungnad died in 1565.

== Sources ==
- Society (1990). Slovene Studies: Journal of the Society for Slovene Studies. The Society.
- Črnja, Zvane (1978). Kulturna povijest Hrvatske: Temelji. Otokar Keršovani.
- Betz, Hans Dieter (30 June 2007). Religion past and present. Brill.
- Klaić, Vjekoslav (1974). Povijest Hrvatâ od najstarijih vremena de svršetka XIX stoljeća. Matica hrvatska.
- Breyer, Mirko (1952). O starim i rijetkim jugoslavenskim knjigama: bibliografsko-bibliofilski prikaz. Izdavački zavod Jugoslavenske akademije znanosti i umjetnosti.
- Lubotsky, Alexander; Schaeken, J.; Wiedenhof, Jeroen (1 January 2008). Evidence and Counter-evidence: Balto-Slavic and Indo-European linguistics. Rodopi. ISBN 90-420-2470-4.
- Sakcinski, Ivan Kukuljević (1886). Glasoviti hrvati proslih vjekova: niz zivotopisa. Naklada "Matice hrvatske".
- Review (1988). The Slavonic and East European review.
- Vorndran, Rolf (1977). Südslawische Reformationsdrucke in der Universitätsbibliothek Tübingen: e. Beschreibung d. vorhandenen glagolit., kyrill. u. a. Drucke d. Uracher Bibelanst. Franz Steiner Verlag. ISBN 978-3-16-939761-7.
- Društvo (1972). Bibliotekar. Društvo bibliotekara N.R. Srbije.
- Rotar, Janez (1988). Trubar in Južni Slovani. Državna zal. Slovenije.
- Mošin, Vladimir A.; Pop-Atanasov, Ǵorgi (2002). Izbrani dela. Menora.
- Матица (1976). Review of Slavic studies. Matica srpska.
- štamparija (1922). Prilozi za književnost, jezik, istoriju i folklor. Drzhavna štamparija Kralevine srba, khrbata i slovent︠s︡a.
- Balkanologie (1977). Zeitschrift für Balkanologie. R. Trofenik.
- Werner Raupp (Ed.): Mission in Quellentexten. Geschichte der Deutschen Evangelischen Mission von der Reformation bis zur Weltmissionskonferenz Edinburgh 1910, Erlangen/Bad Liebenzell 1990 (ISBN 3-87214-238-0 / 3-88002-424-3), p. 49-50.
