= Miodrag Bulajić =

Serbian politician

Miodrag Bulajić (Serbian Cyrillic: Миодраг Булајић; born 1970) is a politician in Serbia. He served in the city government of Kikinda from 2013 to 2020 and has been a member of the Assembly of Vojvodina since 2020. Bulajić is a member of the Serbian Progressive Party.

== Early life and career ==
Bulajić holds a bachelor's degree from the University of Belgrade as an agricultural engineer and began working for the company Bell Chemicals in 1998. He later received a master's degree as an economist. He lives in the village of Banatsko Veliko Selo in Kikinda.

== Politician ==
Bulajić appeared on the Independent Serbia electoral list, led by the Christian Democratic Party of Serbia, in the 2003 Serbian parliamentary election. The list did not cross the electoral threshold to win any seats in the assembly.

He later appeared in the thirty-second position on the Progressive Party's electoral list for the Kikinda municipal assembly in the 2012 Serbian local elections. The list won a plurality victory with twelve out of thirty-nine mandates, and he was not returned. He was, however, appointed to the municipal council (i.e., the executive branch of the municipal government) in 2013 with responsibility for small and medium enterprises and environmental protection.

Bulajić was awarded the 194th position on the Progressive Party's Aleksandar Vučić – Serbia Is Winning list in the 2016 parliamentary election and was not elected when the list won 131 mandates. Following the election, he was re-appointed to the Kikinda city council with the same responsibilities as before.

=== Member of the Assembly of Vojvodina ===
Bulajić received the seventeenth position on the Progressive Party's Aleksandar Vučić — For Our Children list in the 2020 Vojvodina provincial election and was elected when the list won a majority victory with seventy-six seats out of 120. He is now a member of the assembly committee on urban and spatial planning and environmental protection and the committee on youth and sports.
