= Richard Sherry =

16th-century English schoolteacher and author

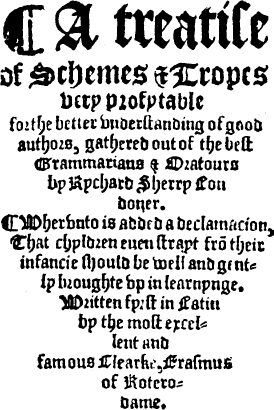
Title page of A Treatise of Schemes and Tropes by Richard Sherry

Richard Sherry (fl. 1550) was an English schoolteacher and author.

== Life ==
He was born about 1506 in the neighbourhood of London. In 1522 he became a demy of Magdalen College, Oxford, and graduated B.A. on 21 June 1527 and M.A. on 10 March 1531. In 1534 he was appointed headmaster of Magdalen College School. He held this post until 1540, when he was succeeded by Goodall. Subsequently, he established himself near London, and devoted himself to original writings and translations. He died shortly after 1555.

== Works ==
- A verye fruitful exposicion vpon the syxte chapter of Saynte Iohn diuided into. x. homelies or sermons: written in Latin by the ryghte excellente clarke Master Iohn Brencius, translated into English by Richard Shirrye, Londoner., London, 1550. Translation from Johann Brentz, dedicated to Thomas Wentworth, 1st Baron Wentworth.
- A treatise of Schemes and Tropes very profitable for the better understanding of good authors, gathered out of the best Grammarians and Oratours by Richard Sherry Londoner. Whervnto is added a declamacion, That chyldren euen strayt frõ their infancie should be well and gently broughte vp in learnynge. Written fyrst in Latin by the most excellent and famous Clearke, Erasmus of Roterodame. London, 1550. This was the first systematic treatment in English of figures of speech, printed with a translation of the De civilitate morum puerilium of Erasmus. The dedication was to a Thomas Brooke, who has been identified as Thomas Brooke the translator.
- ‘St. Basill the Great his letter to Gregory Nazianzen translated by Richard Sherrie,’ London, n.d. 8vo.
- A Treatise of the Figures of Grammer and Rhetorike, London, 1555. Dedicated to William Paget, 1st Baron Paget.

== John Sherry ==
According to Edward Irving Carlyle writing in the Dictionary of National Biography, Richard Sherry has sometimes been identified with John Sherry (d. 1551), who was in 1541 archdeacon of Lewes and rector of Chailey in Sussex; he became precentor of St. Paul's, London, in 1543, and died in 1551.
