= Miodrag Jovanović (footballer, born 1986) =

Serbian footballer

Personal information
- Full name: Miodrag Jovanović
- Date of birth: July 10, 1986 (age 40)
- Place of birth: Aleksandrovac, SFR Yugoslavia
- Height: 1.83 m (6 ft 0 in)
- Position: Right-back

Senior career*
Years	Team	Apps	(Gls)
2004–2005	Obilić	0	(0)
2004–2005	→ Mladi Obilić (loan)	25	(1)
2005–2006	Srem	4	(0)
2006–2008	Pobeda	47	(2)
2008–2009	Napredak Kruševac	1	(0)
2009	Pobeda	1	(0)
2010	Metalurg Skopje	4	(0)
2011	Radnički Niš		
2012	11 Oktomvri	6	(0)
2013-2020	Kopaonik		
2020	Župa Aleksandrovac		
2021-2022	Sloga Dašnica		
- * Club domestic league appearances and goals

Miodrag Jovanović (Serbian Cyrillic: Миодраг Јовановић; born 10 July 1986) is a Serbian retired footballer.

Jovanović played for Napredak Kruševac in the Serbian SuperLiga.
