= Catechismus in der windischenn Sprach =

1550 book in Slovene

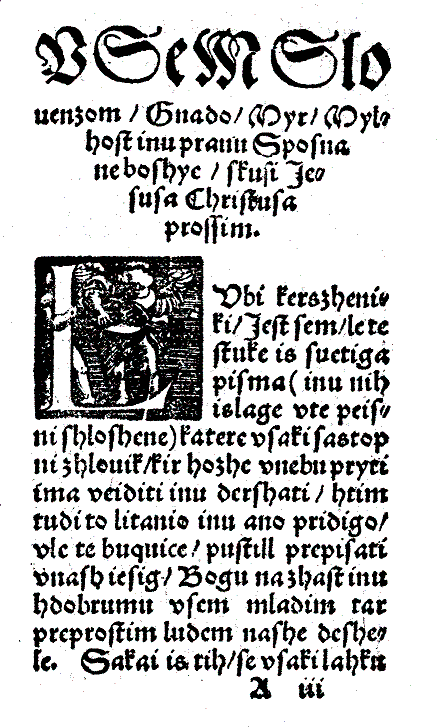
Trubar's Catechismus, first page

Catechismus in der windischenn Sprach or simply Catechismus (Catechism, also known as Katekizem v slovenskem jeziku or simply Katekizem in modern Slovene), is a book written by the Slovene Protestant preacher Primož Trubar in 1550. Along with Trubar's 1550 book, Abecedarium (Abecedary), Catechismus was the first book published in Slovene. Catechismus served as part of a foundation of the establishment of a national identity for Slovenes.

== History ==
Although it was for decades assumed that Catechismus was printed in Tübingen, new research has shown that it was most probably printed in 1550 by Peter Frentz in Schwäbisch Hall.

== Contents ==
Catechismus was originally published in the schwabacher (Gothic script) and reprinted in 1555 in the Latin script. It also contains hymns and a litany, all with musical notation. Based on the German patterns, they are original poems in four different forms of stanzas comprising altogether 500 verses.

== Modern edition ==
Catechismus was released in October 2009 for the first time in modern Slovene. This scholarly edition includes both the Trubar-era Slovene and a translation into modern Slovene with scholarly notes. Similarly, Abecedarium was published in October 2008, the other "first" Slovene book. The "Pridiga o veri" (Sermon on Faith) from Catechismus is available in Slovene, English, German, and Esperanto.

== Cultural references ==
A phrase from Cathecismus, Stati inu Obstati ("To Stand and Withstand"), is inscribed on the Slovenian 1 euro coin and has also been the slogan of the former Slovenian metropolitan archbishop Franc Rode.

== See also ==
- Compendium Catechismi in Slauonica lingua, the first Slovene Catholic book (by Leonhard Pachenecker, printed in Graz, 1574)
