= Primož Trubar =

Carniolan writer, Protestant reformer

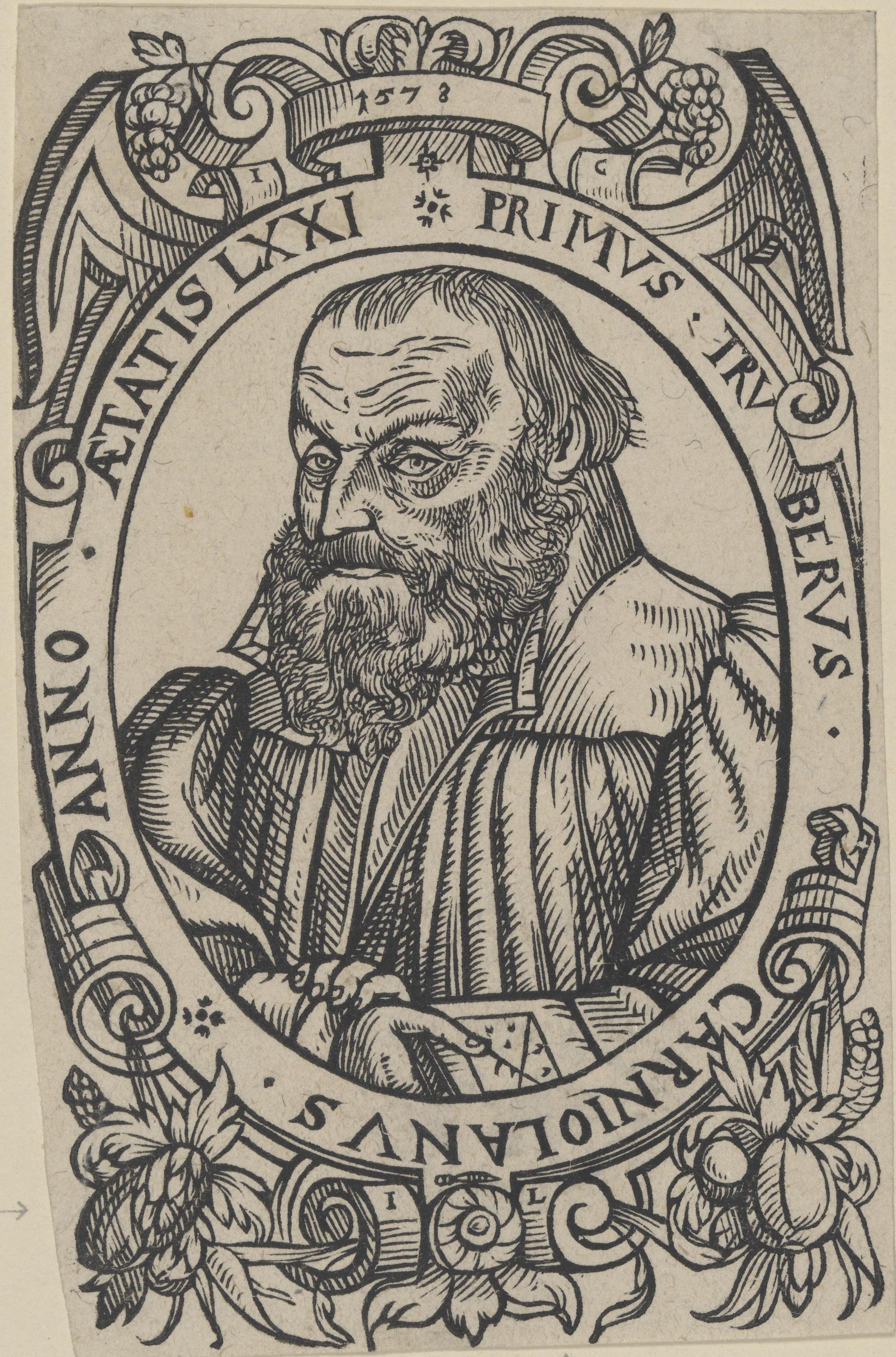
- Primož Trubar, woodcut by Jacob Lederlein, 1578
- Born: 8 June 1508 (Note: The exact date of Trubar's birth is unknown. In different encyclopedias and lexicons, it is given as 8 June 1508 or 9 June 1508, as June 1508 or simply as 1508, the last being the only reliable information.); Rašica, Duchy of Carniola (now Slovenia)
- Died: 28 June 1586 (aged 78); Derendingen, Duchy of Württemberg (now Germany)
- Occupation: Protestant Reformer
- Movement: Lutheranism

Primož Trubar or Primus Truber (Note: Primož Trubar used the version Primus Truber throughout his life, except in 1550, when he used Trubar.) (1508 – 28 June 1586) was a Slovene Protestant Reformer of the Lutheran tradition, mostly known as the author of the first Slovene language printed book, the founder and the first superintendent of the Protestant Church of the Duchy of Carniola, and for consolidating the Slovenian language. Trubar introduced The Reformation in Slovenia, leading the Austrian Habsburgs to wage the Counter-Reformation, which a small Protestant community survived. Trubar is a key figure of Slovenian history and in many aspects a major historical personality.

== Life and work ==
Trubar was born in the village of Rašica (now in the Municipality of Velike Lašče) in the Duchy of Carniola, then under the Habsburgs. In the years 1520–1521 he attended school in Rijeka, in 1522–1524 he continued his education in Salzburg. From there he went to Trieste under the tutorship of the Roman Catholic bishop Pietro Bonomo, where he got in touch with the Humanist writers, in particular Erasmus of Rotterdam. In 1527 the bishop Pietro Bonomo assigned Trubar a priest position in Loka pri Zidanem Mostu. In 1528 he enrolled at the University of Vienna, but did not complete his studies. In 1530 he returned to the Slovenian Lands and became a preacher in Ljubljana, where he lived up until 1565. While in Ljubljana, he lived in a house, on today's Fish Square (Ribji trg), in the oldest part of the city. Living in Ljubljana had profound impact on his work, he considered Ljubljana the capital of all Slovenes because of its central position in the heart of the Slovene lands and because its residents spoke Slovene as their first language, unlike several other towns in today's Slovenia. It is estimated that in Trubar's period around 70% of Ljubljana's 4000 inhabitants attended mass in Slovene. It was the language of Ljubljana that Trubar took as a foundation of what later became standard Slovene, with small addition of his native speech, that is Lower Carniolan dialect. Trubar considered Ljubljana's speech most suitable, since it sounded much more noble, than his own, simple dialect of his hometown Rašica. His decision to write in Ljubljana's variety was later adopted also by other Protestant writers, who also lived in Ljubljana during Trubar's time. He gradually leaned towards Protestantism and was expelled from Ljubljana in 1547.

In 1550, while a Protestant preacher in Rothenburg, he wrote the first two books in Slovene, Catechismus and Abecedarium, which were then printed that year in Schwäbisch Hall by Peter Frentz. Catechismus also contained the first Slovene musical manuscript in print.

Altogether, Trubar authored 22 books in Slovene and two books in German. He was the first to translate parts of the Bible into Slovene. After the exhortation by Pier Paolo Vergerio, he translated the Gospel of Matthew in 1555 and until 1577 in three parts published the translation of the entire New Testament. In period between 1561 and 1565 Trubar was the manager and supervisor of the South Slavic Bible Institute. Eschatologically minded, he also endeavored to proselytize Muslims in Turkey with his books.

Trubar died in Derendingen, Holy Roman Empire (now part of the city of Tübingen, Germany), where he is also buried.

== Commemoration ==
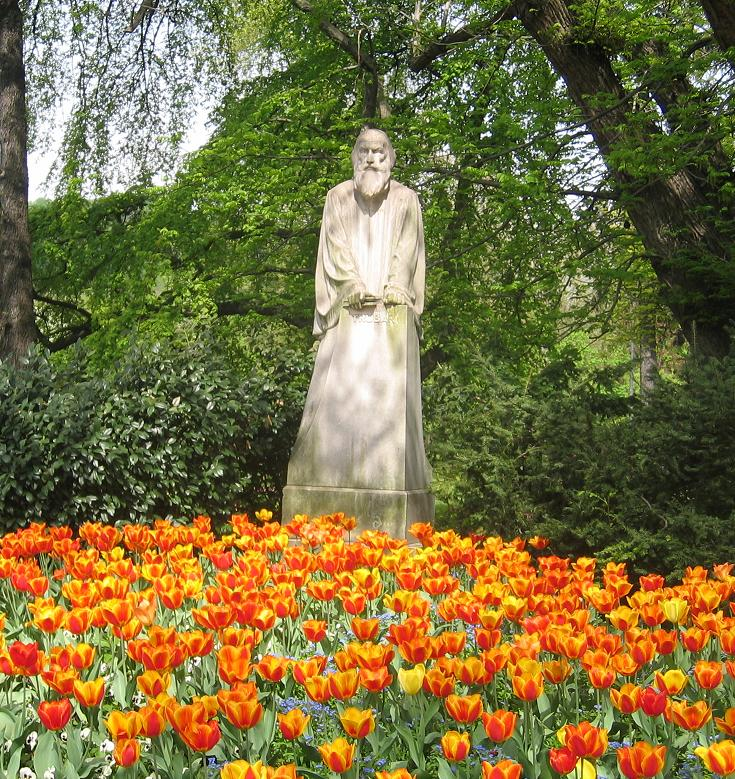
The monument to Primož Trubar by Franc Berneker. White marble, 1910. The statue stands in Trubar Park opposite the Museum of Modern Art in Ljubljana.

On June 4, 1952, the street Šentpeterska cesta in Ljubljana was renamed Trubarjeva cesta after Trubar. It is one of the oldest roads in the city, first mentioned in 1802, and starts in Prešernov trg (Prešeren Square), named after Slovenia's national poet. The street is currently known for its high concentration of ethnic restaurants.

In 1986, Slovene television produced a TV series, directed by Andrej Strojan with the screenplay written by Drago Jančar, in which Trubar was played by the Slovene actor Polde Bibič.

Trubar was commemorated on the 10 tolar banknote in 1992, and on the Slovene 1 euro coin in 2007. In 2008, the Government of Slovenia proclaimed the Year of Primož Trubar and the 500th anniversary of Trubar's birth was celebrated throughout the country. A commemorative €2 coin and a postage stamp were issued. An exhibition dedicated to the life and work of Primož Trubar, and the achievements of the Slovene Reformation Movement was on display at the National Museum of Slovenia from 6 March to 31 December 2008.

In 2009, the Trubar Forum Association printed Trubar's Catechism and Abecedarium in modern Slovene, in a scholarly edition that includes both the Trubar-era Slovene and the modern Slovene translation with scholarly notes. The "Sermon on Faith", a portion of the Catechism, is available in modern Slovene, English, German and Esperanto.

Since 2010, 8 June is commemorated in Slovenia as Primož Trubar Day. Google celebrated his 505th birthday anniversary with a dedicated Google Doodle.

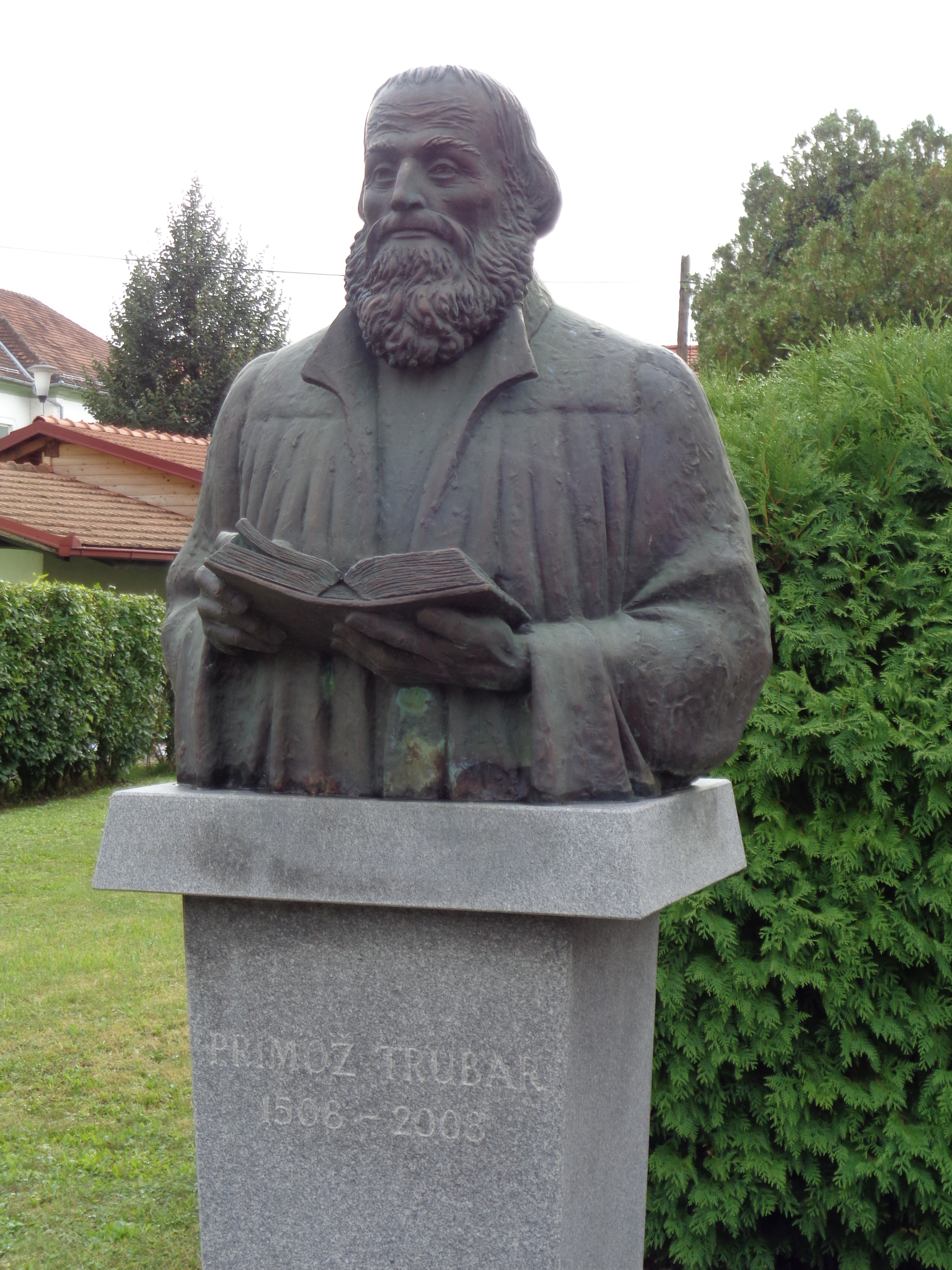
Primož Trubar bust in Lendava

== Bibliography ==
Books written or published by Trubar include:

- Catechismvs. V slouenskim Iesiku sano kratko sastopno Islago. Inu ene Molytue tar Nauuki Boshy. Vseti is zhistiga suetiga pisma. Državna Založba Slovenije. 1555.
- Ta slovenski kolendar kir vselei terpi: inu ena tabla per nim, ta kasshe inu praui try inu sedemdesset leit naprei... Cankarjeva založba. 1557.
- Catechismus, mit Außlegung, in der Syruischen Sprach. Ulrich Morhardt. 1561.
- Ena duhovska peissen subper Turke inu vse sovrashnike te Cerque Boshye. Cankarjeva založba. 1567.
- Cerkovna ordninga. Trofenik.
- Kerszhanske leipe molitve sa use potreibe inu Stanuve, na usaki dan skusi ceil Tiedan, poprei v Bukovskim inu Nemshkim Jesiki, skusi Iansha Habermana pissane, Sdai pak tudi pervizh v Slovenskzhino stolmazhene, Skusi Iansha Tulszhaka. Skusi Iansha Mandelza, utim Leitu. 1579.
- Ta pervi deil tiga noviga testamenta, 1557, doi:10.3931/e-rara-79377 (Digitized Edition at E-rara).
- Katehismus. Edna malahna kniga ... : Catechismus, mit Außlegung, in der Syruischen Sprach, 1561, doi:10.3931/e-rara-79803 (Digitized Edition at E-rara).
- Ta celi catehismus : Catechismus mit des Herrn Johañis Brentzij kurtzen Außlegung in Windischer und Teutscher Sprach zůsamen getruckt, 1567, doi:10.3931/e-rara-79802 (Digitized Edition at E-rara).
- (Übersetzung:) Artikuli ili deli prave stare krstjanske vere. Confessio oder bekanntnuß des glaubens. Tübingen 1562, doi:10.3931/e-rara-79378 (Digitized edition at E-rara).
- Postila to est, kratko istlmačenǵe vsih' nedelskih' evanéliov', i poglaviteih' prazdnikov, skrozi vse leto, sada naiprvo cirulickimi slovi štampana : Kurtze auszlegung über die Sontags vnd der fürnembsten Fest Euangelia durch das gantz jar jetzt erstlich in crobatischer sprach mit Cirulischen bůchstaben getruckt. Tübingen 1562, doi:10.3931/e-rara-79379 (Digitized edition at E-rara)

== See also ==
- Schweipolt Fiol
- Đurađ Crnojević
- Stefan Marinović
- Hieromonk Makarije
- Hieromonk Mardarije
- Hegumen Mardarije
- Vićenco Vuković
- Hieromonk Pahomije
- Trojan Gundulić
- Andrija Paltašić
- Jakov of Kamena Reka
- Coresi
- Bartolomeo Ginammi who followed Zagurović's footsteps reprinting Serbian books.
- Inok Sava
- Stefan Paštrović
- Jovan Maleševac
- Symon Budny
- Francysk Skaryna
- Ivan Fyodorov
- Adam Bohorič
- Božidar Goraždanin
- Dimitrije Ljubavić
- István Küzmics
- Jurij Dalmatin
- Jovan Maleševac
- List of Glagolitic printed works
- Sebastian Krelj
