= Mose =

Mose, Mosè, or Mosé is a given name which may refer to:

== People ==
=== In religion ===
- Mose Durst, former president of the Unification Church of the United States
- Mosé Higuera, Colombian Catholic bishop
- Mosè Tovini, Italian Roman Catholic priest

=== In music ===
- Mose Allison, American jazz pianist and singer
- Mose Christensen, American musician, founder and conductor of the Oregon Symphony
- Mose Rager, guitar player from Kentucky
- Mose Vinson (1917–2002), American pianist and singer

=== In visual art ===
- Mosè Bianchi, Italian painter and printmaker
- Mose Tolliver, American painter
- Mosè Turri, Italian painter

=== In sports ===
- Mosé Arosio (born 1892), Italian racing cyclist
- Mose Bashaw (1889–1933), American football player
- Mose Frazier (born 1993), American former football player
- Mose Goodman (born c. 1895), American football coach
- Mose Lantz (1903–1969), American football player
- Mosé Navarra (born 1974), Italian tennis player
- Mose Solomon (1900-1966), American baseball player
- Mose Tuiali'i (born 1981), New Zealand rugby union player

=== In other fields ===
- Mose (Ancient Egyptian official), 13th-century BCE Egyptian official under Ramesses II
- Mose (scribe), 13th-century BCE Egyptian scribe under Ramesses II
- Mosè Giacomo Bertoni, Swiss naturalist who studied Paraguayan plants
- Mosè de Brolo (Moses of Bergamo), 12th-century Italian poet and translator
- Mose Gingerich, Amish-born American documentary maker
- Mose Humphrey, American firefighter
- Mose Jefferson, American politician
- Mose Khoneli, 12th-century Georgian writer and poet
- Mosè Piccio, 16th-century Ottoman lexicographer
- Mose Penaani Tjitendero, Namibian politician and educator
- Mose Wright, uncle of Emmett Till who was a witness at the murder trial

== Fictional characters ==
- Mose the Fireboy, prototypical representation of a b'hoy in 19th-century American theatre
- Mose Jakande, a Nigerian-French mercenary in the film Furious 7
- Mose Manuel, a recurring character on the HBO series Deadwood
- Mose Schrute, a character from the American adaptation of the TV series The Office

== See also ==
- MOSE, a Venetian engineering project
- Moze (disambiguation)
