= Mose (disambiguation) =

Mose is a masculine given name. Mose or MOSE may also refer to:

== Surname ==
- Carl C. Mose (1903–1973), American sculptor and art teacher
- Charonne Mose, Canadian choreographer, creative director and dancer
- Erik Møse (born 1950), Norwegian judge on the Supreme Court of Norway
- Robert Mose (fl. 1421–1427), English Member of Parliament
- Viviane Mosé (born 1964), Brazilian poet, philosopher, psychologist, psychoanalyst and public policy consultant

== Places ==
- Moše, Slovenia, a village
- Mose, North Dakota, a community in the United States
- Fort Mose, Florida, United States – see Fort Mose Historic State Park

== Other uses ==
- MOSE, an infrastructure project designed to protect Venice from flooding
- Hirth Hi 20 MoSe, a German late 1930s motor glider

== See also ==
- Moze (disambiguation)
