= Moses (surname) =

Moses is a surname derived from the Biblical Moses. It can be of either Jewish, Welsh, or English origin. The Hebrew form of the name, Moshe, is probably of Egyptian origin, from a short form of any of various ancient Egyptian personal names, such as Ramesses and Tutmose, meaning "conceived by (a certain god)". The Arabic form of the name is Musa. However, very early in its history it acquired a folk etymology, being taken as a derivative of the Hebrew root verb mšh, "to draw (something from the water", a reference to the story of the infant Moses being discovered among the bulrushes by Pharaoh's daughter (Exodus 2:1-10). As a Welsh family name, it was adopted among Dissenter families in the eighteenth and nineteenth centuries. As a North American family name, it has been an anglicization of foreign forms of the name, such as Moise, Moshe, or Mozes.

People with this name include:

- A. Dirk Moses (born 1967), Australian historian
- Adolph S. Moses (1840–1902), German-American rabbi
- Ahmaad Moses (born 2004), American football player
- Albert Moses (1937–2017), Sri Lankan-born British actor
- Alfred Moses (politician) (1977–2022), Canadian politician
- Alfred H. Moses (born 1929), American attorney and diplomat
- Alfred Huger Moses (1840–1918), American banker and investor
- Anna Mary Robertson Moses (1860–1961), "Grandma Moses", American folk artist and painter
- Anthony John Moses (born 1942), Welsh scientist
- Bob Moses (activist) (1935–2021), American civil rights activist
- Bob Moses (musician) (born 1948), American jazz drummer
- Bob Moses (rugby league) (1940–2017), Australian rugby league footballer
- Brian Moses (born 1950), English poet
- Burke Moses (born 1959), American actor
- Carl E. Moses (1929–2014), American businessman and politician
- Charles Moses (1900–1988), English head of the Australian Broadcasting Corporation
- Charles Moses (athlete) (born 1954), Ghanaian sprinter
- Charles L. Moses (1856–1910), American politician
- Dai Moses (c. 1925–1999), Welsh rugby union and rugby league footballer
- Dan Mozes (born 1983), American football player
- Daniel David Moses (1952–2020), Canadian poet
- David Moses (footballer) (born 2004), Nigerian footballer
- David Lokonga Moses (contemporary), South Sudanese politician
- Dylan Moses (born 1998), American football player
- Ed Moses (artist) (1926–2018), American artist
- Ed Moses (physicist) (contemporary), American physicist
- Ed Moses (swimmer) (born 1980), American swimmer
- Edwin Moses (born 1955), American track and field athlete
- Esmond Moses (born 1974), Micronesian politician
- Franklin J. Moses Jr. (1838–1906), American politician
- Franklin J. Moses Sr. (1804–1877), American attorney, planter, politician and judge
- George H. Moses (1869–1944), American diplomat
- Glyn Moses (1928–2021), Welsh rugby union and rugby league footballer
- Hagin ben Moses (fl. 1255–1290), English rabbi
- Harry Moses (1858–1938), Australian cricketer
- Haven Moses (born 1946), American football player
- Helen Moses (1905–1985), American swimmer
- Henry Moses (engraver) (1781–1870), English engraver
- Henry Moses (politician) (1832–1926), Australian politician
- Henry C. Moses (1941–2008), American educator
- Ingrid Moses (born 1941), Australian academic
- Isaac S. Moses (1847–1926), German-American rabbi
- Itamar Moses (born 1977), American author
- J. C. Moses (1936–1977), jazz drummer
- J. J. Moses (born 1979), American football player
- Janice Moses, Trinidadian cricketer
- Jimmy Moses (born 1965), Indian actor, playback singer, stand-up comedian and mimicry artist
- Joel Moses (1941–2022), Israeli-American computer scientist
- John Moses (Norwegian politician) (1781–1849), member of the Norwegian Constituent Assembly
- John Moses (Illinois politician) (1825–1898), Illinois judge and politician
- John Moses (North Dakota politician) (1885–1945), governor of North Dakota
- John Moses (baseball) (born 1957), American baseball player
- John Moses (priest) (1938–2024), English clergyman
- John A. Moses (1930–2024), Australian historian, history educator and Anglican priest
- Kareem Moses (born 1990), Trinidadian footballer
- Lincoln Moses (1921–2006), American biostatistician
- Louie Moses, American businessman
- Margaret Veronica Moses (1940–1975), Australian Sister of Mercy, teacher, poet and orphanage administrator
- Mark Moses (born 1958), American actor
- Merrill Moses (born 1977), American water polo player
- Mikaella Moshe (born 2003), Israeli archer
- Miriam Moses (1884–1965), British politician
- Mitchell Moses (born 1994), Australian-born Lebanese international rugby league footballer
- Noah Mozes (1912–1985), Israeli newspaper publisher and managing editor
- Pablo Moses (born 1948), Jamaican singer
- Paul B. Moses (1929–1966), American art historian and educator
- Paul J. Moses (1897–1965), American physician and academic
- Paulus Moses (born 1978), Namibian boxer
- Quentin Moses (1983–2017), American football player
- Raphael J. Moses (1812–1893), American lawyer, plantation owner, Confederate officer and politician
- Remi Moses (1960–2025), English footballer
- Rick Moses (born 1952), American actor and singer-songwriter
- Robert Moses (1888–1981), American urban planner
- Senta Moses (born 1973), American actress
- Shelia P. Moses (born 1961), American author
- Ted Moses (born 1950), Canadian politician
- Teedra Moses (born 1976), American R&B singer and songwriter
- Victor Moses (born 1990), Nigerian born English footballer
- Wally Moses (1910–1990), American baseball player
- Wayne Moses (1955–2024), American football coach
- William Moses (academic) (1623–1688), English academic and lawyer, Master of Pembroke College, Cambridge
- William Moses (businessman) (born 1962), American businessman and investor
- William A. Moses (1933–2002), American real estate developer
- William Henry Moses Jr. (1901–1991), African American architect and educator
- William R. Moses (born 1959), American actor
- William Stainton Moses (1839–1892), English cleric and spiritualist medium
- William Moses (bishop), Indian religious leader, bishop of Coimbatore
- Wilson Jeremiah Moses (1942–2024), American historian
- Winfield Moses (born 1943), American politician
- Yolanda T. Moses (born 1946), American anthropologist and college administrator

== See also ==
- Moses (given name)
- Moses (disambiguation)
- Mozes (surname)
- Moise (disambiguation)

== Bibliography ==
- Hanks, Patrick, Dictionary of American Family Names (2003), Oxford University Press, ISBN 0-19-508137-4
- Hanks, Patrick and Flavia Hodges, Oxford Dictionary of Names, (1988), Oxford University Press, ISBN 0-19-211592-8
