= Moses (disambiguation) =

Moses was the reputed author of the Biblical Pentateuch and protagonist of the Book of Exodus.

Moses may also refer to:

== People and fictional characters ==
- Moses (given name), including a list of people and fictional characters
- Moses (surname), including a list of people
- Saint Moses

== Places ==
- Moses Coulee, Washington, United States
- Moses Lake, a lake in Washington, United States
- Moses Fork, a stream in West Virginia, United States
- Mount Moses, Hudson Mountains, Ellsworth Land, Antarctica

== Arts and entertainment ==
=== Film and television ===
- Moses (miniseries), a 1995 TV miniseries
- Moses (TV programme), a 2002 British documentary

=== Literature ===
- Book of Moses, part of the Mormon scriptural canon
- Moses: A Narrative, a 1976 poem by Anthony Burgess
- Moses: When Harriet Tubman Led Her People to Freedom, a 2006 children's picture book by Carole Boston Weatherford and Kadir Nelson
- Moses the raven, a fictional character in George Orwell's Animal Farm
- Sixth and Seventh Books of Moses, magical texts supposedly written by Moses

=== Music ===
- Moses (Bruch), an 1895 oratorio by Max Bruch
- Moses (Rubinstein), an 1892 opera by Anton Rubinstein
- Moses (Skoryk), a 2001 opera by Myroslav Skoryk
- Moses, a 2014 musical by Sight & Sound Theatres
- "Moses" (Coldplay song), 2003
- "Moses" (French Montana song), 2015
- "Moses", a song by Jonathan Emile, 2019
- "Moses", a song by Patty Griffin from Living with Ghosts, 1996

=== Sculptures ===
- Moses (Michelangelo), a 16th century marble sculpture
- Moses (1968), a series of three painted steel statues created by Tony Smith
  - Moses (3/3), the third in the series
- Moses (University of Notre Dame), a sculpture by Josip Turkalj
- Moses Mayfield, an American Rock band

=== Paintings ===
- Moses, a 1977 painting by Robert B. Sherman

== Other uses ==
- Moses (horse) (1819–1836), a British Thoroughbred racehorse
- Moses (machine translation), a free statistical machine translation engine
- MOSES (spacecraft), a Manned Orbiting Shuttle Escape System proposed by General Electric
- Metropolitan Organizing Strategy Enabling Strength, an American interfaith group
- Military Open Simulator Enterprise Strategy, a United States Army training research project
- Operation Moses, a 1984 Jewish evacuation mission

== See also ==
- Black Moses (disambiguation)
- MOSE Project, an aquatic barrier tracing its name to Moses
- Moshe, nickname for Neanderthal skeleton found in Kebara Cave
- MOSIS, acronym for Metal Oxide Semiconductor Implementation Service
