= John Muratore =

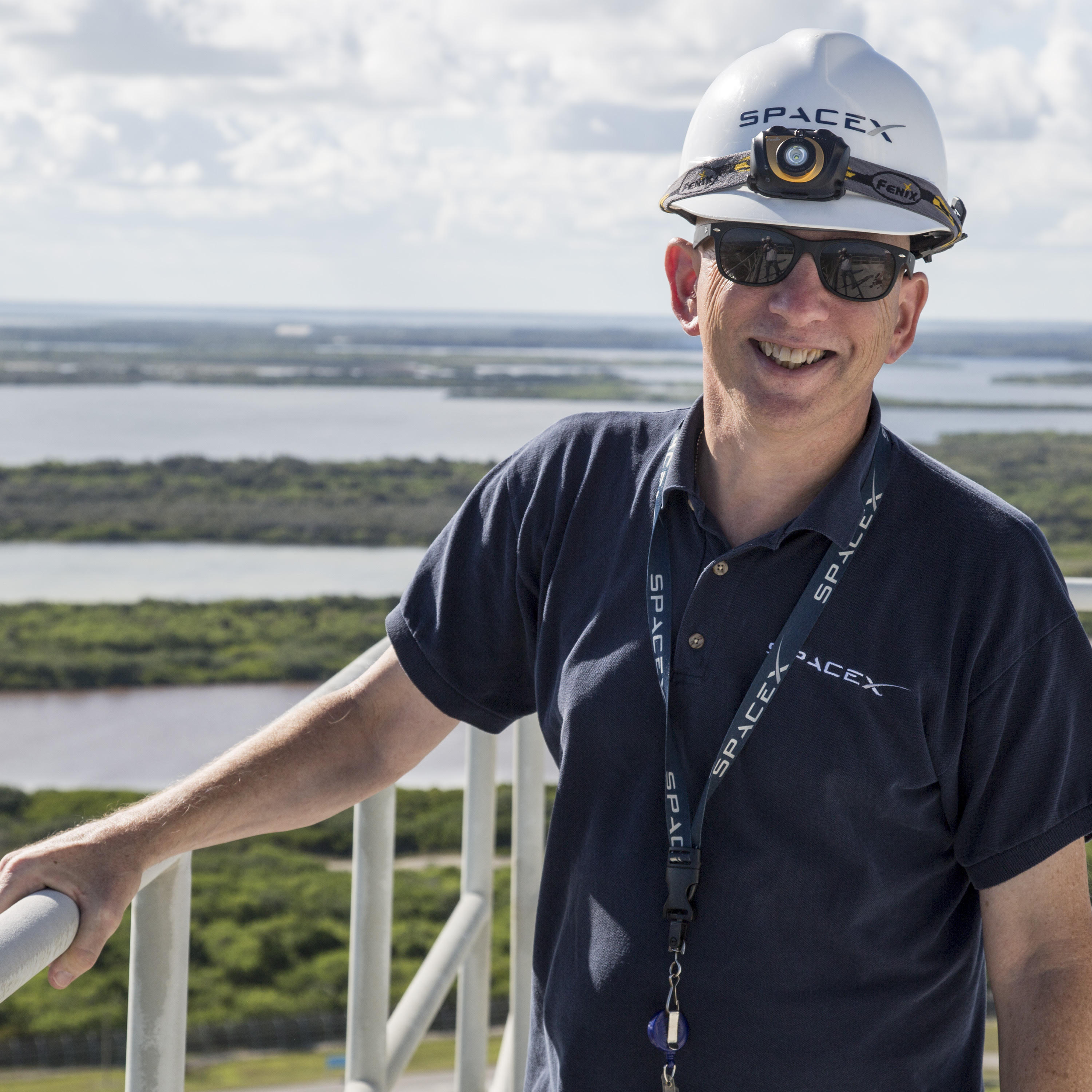
- Born: 1956 (age 69–70); Brooklyn, New York City

John F. Muratore (born 1956) is a former NASA systems engineer-project manager and launch director at SpaceX. He is well known in the aerospace circles for his gregarious and unconventional style and use of rapid spiral development to reduce cost and schedule for introducing technical innovations.

== Biography ==
Muratore was born in Brooklyn in 1956. He earned his Bachelor of Science in Electrical Engineering in 1979 from Yale University and a Master of Science in Computer Science in 1988 from the University of Houston–Clear Lake. He served in the US Air Force on the Air Force Space Shuttle Program at Vandenberg AFB, CA from 1979 until 1983 where he spent most of his time on assignment at Kennedy Space Center working on the Launch Sequence software. After his tour in the Air Force, Mr. Muratore joined NASA JSC after which he held progressively responsible leadership positions including Space Shuttle Flight Director, and Chief, Control Center Systems Division in the Mission Operations Directorate; and Associate Director and Deputy Manager, Advance Development Office and Assistant to the Director, Engineering within the Engineering Directorate. He was the 35th flight director in the history of human spaceflight of the United States and had the call sign "Kitty Hawk Flight" in honor of the location of the Wright Brothers first powered flight. As Chief of the Control Center Division, he led the conversion of Mission Control Center from the Apollo legacy mainframe based system to a networked Unix workstation based system to support Space Shuttle and the International Space Station.

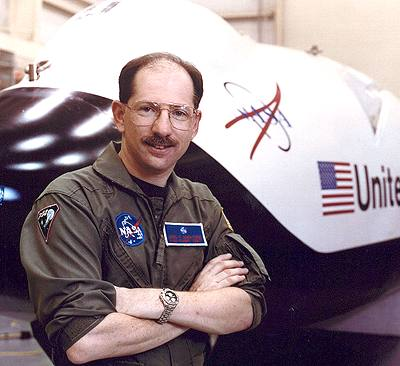
John F. Muratore, Program Manager, X-38, 1996 to 2003.

From 1996 to 2003, he was the Program Manager of the X-38 program, an unmanned demonstrator which performed a series of successful demonstration flights at Edwards Air Force Base. He gathered a team of young, relatively inexperienced but highly motivated engineers to try to apply the 'faster, better, cheaper' method advocated by Daniel Goldin to human spaceflight, in order for NASA to obtain at affordable cost a Crew Return Vehicle. In addition to serving as the project manager, Muratore served as Mission Director and B-52 Launch Panel Operator for several of the atmospheric drop tests of the vehicle.

In 2003, the X-38 program was cancelled due to the International Space Station program's financial woes. Following the Columbia accident, Mr. Muratore was named Manager, Space Shuttle Systems Engineering and Integration Office, where he led the re-certification of the shuttle to enable its return to flight.

In April 2006, following his technical opposition to Michael Griffin's decisions regarding the Shuttle return to flight, he was reassigned as Senior Systems Engineer supporting the Shuttle/Station Engineering Office in the Engineering Directorate.

In August 2006, as part of NASA's outreach program, Muratore became an adjunct lecturer at Rice University in Houston, Texas. He taught graduate-level classes in Aerospace Systems Engineering and Introductory Flight Testing. Also while at Rice, Muratore advised an undergraduate Senior Design group tasked with creating an experiment to be flown on NASA's Weightless Wonder microgravity research aircraft. The purpose of the experiment was to demonstrate the feasibility of using the aircraft as a test-bed for commercial small-scale zero-gravity systems; testing of such systems in a 1 G environment requires costly simulators that cannot completely model micro- and zero-gravity environments. The Rice team, under the guidance of Muratore, showed that the NASA aircraft indeed was a viable platform for such testing, creating an impressive mock satellite in only two semesters with a very limited budget.

Muratore's experiences at Rice University inspired him to teach full-time. He served four years as a research associate professor at the University of Tennessee Space Institute in Tullahoma, TN. His research at UTSI focused on the use of advanced airborne data acquisition networks for aircraft flight testing and airborne science. He instrumented aircraft that supported missions for NASA and NOAA making earth observations and performing atmospheric sampling. A course he developed in Space Systems Engineering at UTSI is hosted by NASA online for free access.

In 2011, Muratore returned to space development by joining SpaceX of Hawthorne California. He supported the first commercial Falcon-9/Dragon mission to the International Space Station in May 2012. Mr Muratore served as the Launch Chief Engineer for the Falcon 9-7 launch of the SES-8 satellite in December 2013, the Falcon 9-8 launch of the Thaicom-6 satellite in January 2014 and the Falcon 9-15 launch of the DSCOVR spacecraft in February 2015. Muratore led the conversion of Launch Complex 39a and was Launch Director for the first flight of Falcon 9 at Launch Complex 39a in February 2017. Muratore then worked on the rebuild of SLC-40 which was damaged in the AMOS-6 explosion on 1 Sept 2016. Muratore was Launch Director for the first launch off the rebuilt SLC-40 in December 2017.

In 2018 Muratore moved to South Texas to serve as the site director for the SpaceX complex at Boca Chica Texas, Muratore led the development of the site, the Starship build facilities and the launch pad. In 2019 Muratore served as the launch director for the first flight of Starhopper, a prototype of the SpaceX Mars Starship vehicle. Starhopper was the first SpaceX flight test of the Raptor methane-LOX engine.

During his time at NASA, Mr Muratore was awarded the NASA Outstanding Leadership Medal, The NASA Exceptional Achievement Medal and the NASA Exceptional Service Medal.

In September 2020, Muratore left SpaceX and joined Kairos Power as Senior Director of Special Projects. In this role, Muratore led the construction and operations of the Engineering Test Unit hardware demonstration in Albuquerque New Mexico. Kairos Power's mission is to enable the world’s transition to clean energy, with the ultimate goal of dramatically improving people’s quality of life while protecting the environment. Mr Muratore left Kairos Power in March 2023 at the completion of the ETU-1 build. The ETU-1 build was described in the 7 February 2023 edition of the Atlantic magazine.

In April 2023, Muratore re-entered aerospace joining Venturi Astrolab working on the Lunar Terrain Vehicle (LTV) Services contract proposal. In April 2024, Venturi Astrolab won a competitive contract for developing a LTV rover for human and robotic exploration of the lunar South Pole. Muratore is serving as the Program Manager for Astrolab's effort.

Muratore is a registered Professional Engineer (PE) in the State of Texas.

== Publications ==
Muratore has written several articles. A selection:

- John F. Muratore, Troy A. Heindel, Terri B. Murphy, Arthur N. Rasmussen, and Robert Z. McFarland, Space Shuttle Telemetry Monitoring by Expert Systems in Mission Control In Innovative Applications of Artificial Intelligence, H. Schoor and A. Rappaport, Eds., AAAI Press, 1989, pp. 3–14.
- 1990. John F. Muratore, Troy A. Heindel, Terri B. Murphy, Arthur N. Rasmussen, Robert Z. McFarland: "Real-Time Data Acquisition at Mission Control". In: Commun. ACM 33(12): 18-31 (1990)
- Ricardo Machin, Jenny Stein, John F. Muratore, An overview of the X-38 prototype crew return vehicle development and test program,15th Aerodynamic Decelerator Systems Technology Conference,10.2514/6.1999-1703, https://arc.aiaa.org/doi/abs/10.2514/6.1999-1703
- 2009 Chapter 7 Emergency Systems of “Safety Design of Space Systems” Gary Eugene Musgrave, Axel (Skip) M. Larsen and Tommaso Sgobba Elsevier
