= Mozes =

Mozes may refer to:

- Mozes (given name), male given name
- Mozes (surname), surname
- Mozes en Aäronkerk, church in the Waterlooplein neighborhood of Amsterdam, the Netherlands
- Mozes Kilangin Airport, airport located in Timika, Central Papua, Indonesia

== See also ==
- Moses (disambiguation)
