= X38 =

X38 may refer to:

- X38 (New York City bus)
- NASA X-38, an American experimental re-entry vehicle
- X38, an Intel Core 2 chipset
