= Alfred Moses =

Alfred Moses may refer to:

- Alfred H. Moses (born 1929), former US ambassador to Romania
- Alfred Moses (politician) (born 1977), Northwest Territories MLA, 2011–19
- Alfred Huger Moses (1840–1918), American banker and investor who founded Sheffield, Alabama
- Alfred Geiger Moses (1878–1956), rabbi in Alabama and founder of Jewish Science

== See also ==
- Moses (surname)
