= Moze =

Moze is an Italian surname derived from the Latin word Mosè (Moses). The earliest records of the name trace its appearance back to the region of Tuscany, in Pisa. It is also a nickname. It may refer to:

- Francis Moze (born 1946), French bass player
- Samrat Moze (born 1981), Indian politician
- Jennifer "Moze" Mosely, a character in the American television series Ned's Declassified School Survival Guide
- Moses "Moze" Pray, the male lead character of the film Paper Moon, played by Ryan O'Neal

== See also ==
- Mose (disambiguation)
- Moses (surname)
- Mozes (surname)
