= Amiran-Darejaniani =

Medieval Georgian romance

Amiran-Darejaniani (Georgian: ამირანდარეჯანიანი), translated into English as "The story of Amiran, son of Darejan", is a medieval Georgian romance, dating probably from the early or middle decades of the twelfth century. It is one of those literary works which heralded the emergence of native secular literature after several centuries of domination by patristic tradition. It is a prose tale of battling knights in twelve episodes attributed to Moses of Khoni (Mose Khoneli; მოსე ხონელი). This attribution is found in the epilogue of Vep’khis-tqaosani, an epic poem by Shota Rustaveli, the greatest classic of medieval Georgian literature, and is otherwise unknown. A tradition holds it that Moses came from the town of Khoni in western Georgia, and, like Rustaveli, served at the court of Queen Tamar (r. 1184-1213), who presided over the Georgian Golden Age.

Amiran-Darejaniani was first published by the self-educated Georgian literary critic and bibliophile Zakaria Chichinadze in 1896, followed by several critical editions in the 20th century. The epos was first introduced to the English-speaking world through a translation by Robert Horne Stevenson in 1958. Next appeared a Russian translation by Bidzina Abuladze in 1965.

== Origin and context ==
A miniature from the 1824 manuscript of Amiran-Darejaniani copied by David Tumanov (H-384, National Center of Manuscripts).

Amiran-Darejaniani is the oldest surviving original Georgian romance, but its roots can be traced both in Georgian folk tradition and Persian epos which Georgian authors admired and translated; Visramiani, a free Georgian rendition of Vis o Ramin, being the closest to the period in question. Moses of Khoni's composition gave rise to a whole cycle of legends, handed down by the village story-teller. So involved has the interrelation of the literary and folk variants become that some leading experts have suggested that the folk variants, stemming from the legends about Amirani, preceded the literary Amiran-Darejaniani, rather than being derived from it. The Persian and Arabic names and the lack of specific Georgian references in the text have led to a hypothesis, suggested by Marie-Félicité Brosset and Nicholas Marr, but now largely discredited, that Amiran-Darejaniani is a translation of a lost Persian text. Yet, the influence of Persian epic tradition, particularly Ferdowsi’s Shahnameh, is strongly felt.

Over the five following centuries Amiran-Darejaniani was also versified several times. Beyond this, the reflections of Amiran-Darejaniani are also noticeable in Shota Rustaveli’s work. Yet, Amiran-Darejaniani has a flavor somewhat different from that of Visramiani and Vep’khis-tqaosani. Its narrative is less elaborate and adorned, but rather pure and simple – an account of endless battles and joustings, with a strong fairy-tale elements such as dragons, evil spirits, mythic monsters devi, magic men of copper, miraculous elixirs, and other supernatural phenomena.

Amiran-Darejaniani is composed of twelve prose sections or "gates", whose order is often transposed in manuscripts which date to the 17th and 18th century. Set in the Oriental-themed fictional world, the narrative evolves around Amiran, son of Darejan (Amiran Darejanisdze), whose heroic exploits and adventures are related in five sections. The remaining sections are dedicated to other heroes and have no strong connection with each other. Soviet critics have attempted to see in Amiran-Darejaniani a mirror of the society of feudal Georgia, but neither national nor religious pathos plays a role in the tale, its primary focus being on the praise of chivalric ideals of fearlessness and male solidarity as well as vivid description of battle scenes. Its heroes are typically of enormous physical strength, fearless, warlike, merciful toward their defeated human enemies, generous and chivalrous. Yet, courtly love praised by Rustaveli is absent in this story and female interest is minimal. For the heroes of Amiran-Darejaniani, a woman’s love is won by a sword and is no more than a pretext for even greater battles.

== Synopsis ==
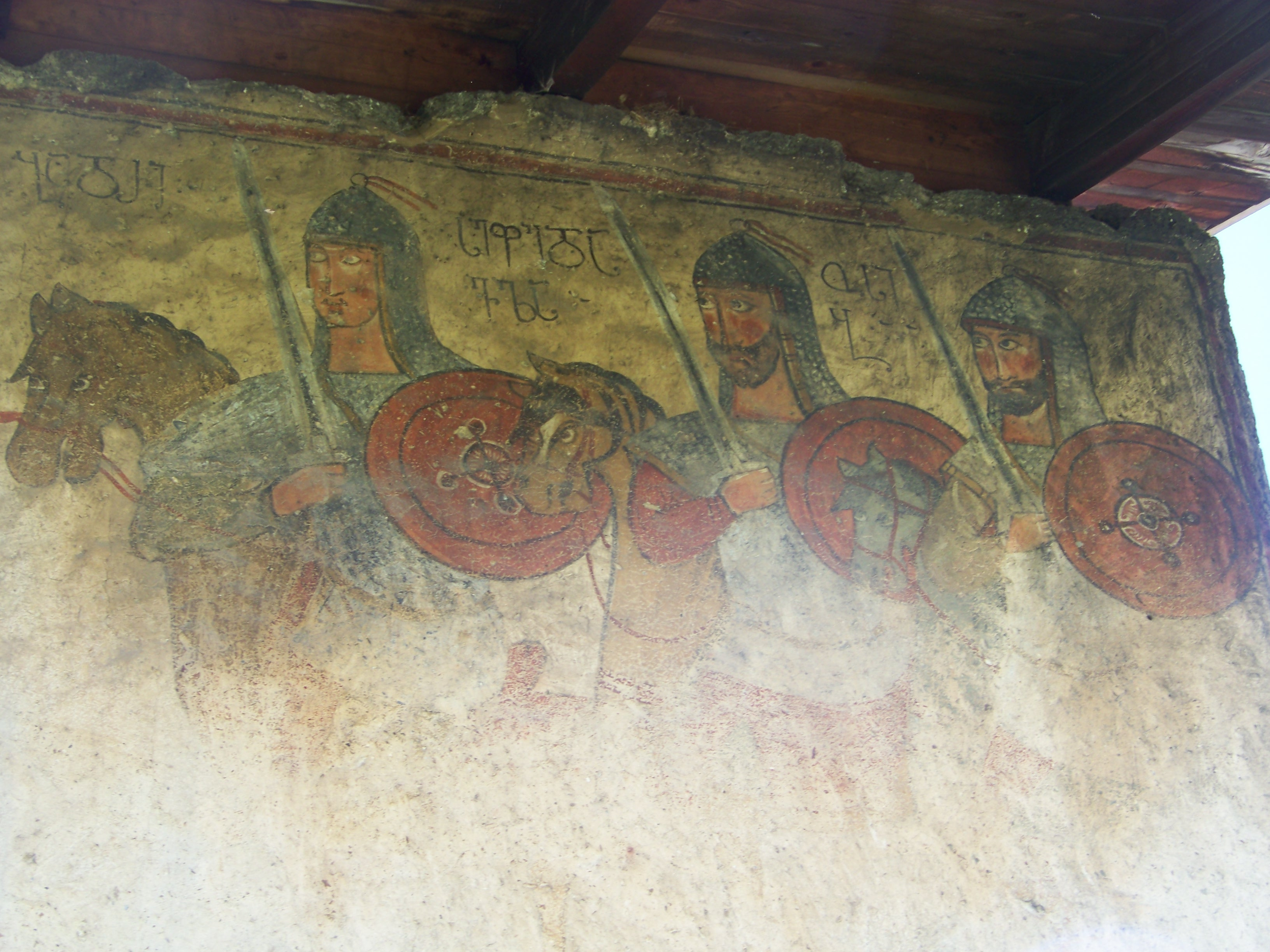
A façade fresco depicting scenes from Amiran-Darejaniani the Lashtkhveri church in Upper Svaneti, dated to the 14th–15th century.

The cycle begins with an introduction in which Abesalom, king of the Indians, is haunted by a mysterious portrait of knights with a short message relating that a daughter of the King of the Seas was delivered by these men from captivity of the kaji, a tribe of evil sorcerers. Abesalom eventually seeks out the last survivor depicted, Savarsamidze, who then becomes one of the main narrators of the romance. Thus the painting, which turns out to illustrate Amiran son of Darejan and his associates, is expanded into a series of tales told to King Abesalom about Amiran and his followers Savarsamidze, Nosar and Badri on their violent missions.

We then hear of Amiran meeting a black-clad and weeping stranger who relates a story of his patron, the knight Badri, son of Iaman (Badri Iamanisdze), who is seized by the monster Baqbaq-Devi on his way back from an extremely dangerous but ultimately successful mission to free and marry the daughter of the King of the Seas. Another valiant knight, Nosar Nosreli, sent by the King of the Seas to deliver Badri, shares the same fate. Amiran, accompanied by his servant Savarsimisdze and the black-clad man, sets out on a campaign to free the captured knights. After a wild sequence of battles, encounters with monsters and other adventures, Amiran relieves Badri and Nosar, and murders Baqbaq-Devi. Victorious, Amiran departs to seek a jousting with the renowned Arab warrior Ambri from the Yemen who has gained fame, among other things, for his defeat of three Turkish giants and liberation of Arabia, but finds Ambri dead. Amiran then travels, following to the request of Amir Mumli of Baghdad, to the Land of the Stars where he defeats all knights seeking hands of the seven beautiful daughters of King Aspan and brings three of these maidens as brides to the sons of Mumli. After this, Amiran departs, inspired by a dream, to the Land of Talismans and marries a local beauty Khvareshan, having overcome numerous obstacles on his way. Next comes a tale of the famed warrior Sepedavle, son of Darispan (Sepedavle Darispanisdze), whose deeds intrigues Amiran into challenging him into a single combat which does not reveal a victor and the two men become friends. They together move to Ghazna where they kill five local giants and massacre the entire populace, avenging a treacherous murder of the noble knight Mzechabuki ("sun-like youth"). In the last chapter Amiran saves Balkh from a demon that devastates the city and marries a daughter of the local king, returning home with fame and glory.
