= Lashtkhveri church =

Church in Svaneti, Georgia

Lashtkhveri church of the Archangel
- ლაშთხვერის მთავარანგელოზის ეკლესია
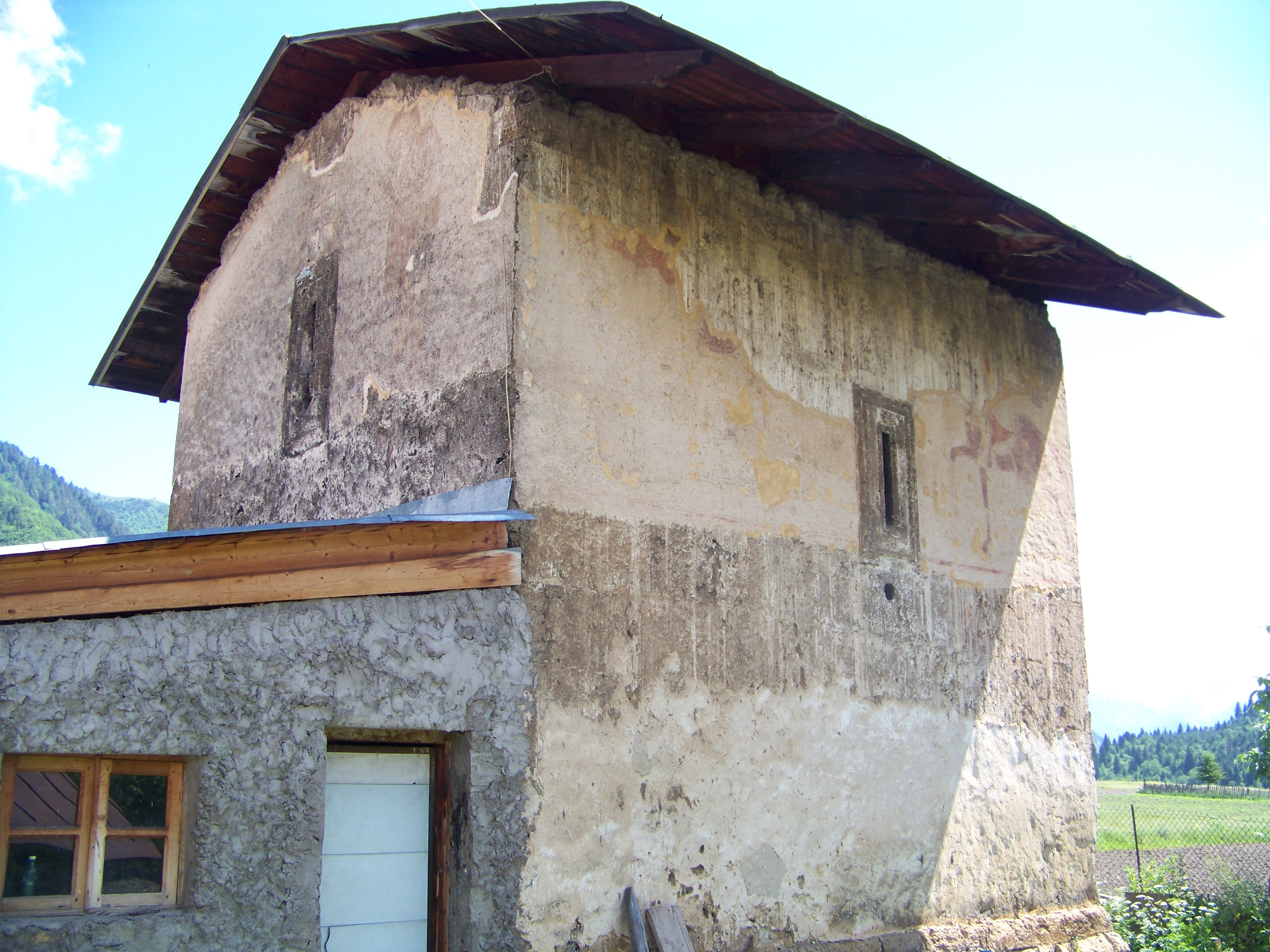
- Lashtkhveri church of the Archangel
- Location: Lashtkhveri, Mestia Municipality, Samegrelo-Zemo Svaneti, Georgia
- Coordinates: 43.032222°N 42.695000°E
- Type: Hall church

The Lashtkhveri church of the Archangel (Georgian: ლაშთხვერის მთავარანგელოზის ეკლესია, romanized: lashtkhveris mtavarangelozis ek'lesia), also known as the church of Taringzel (Svan: თარინგზელ) is a medieval Georgian Orthodox church in Mestia, Upper Svaneti. Architecturally an unremarkable hall church, its most recognizable feature is a series of frescoes painted on both internal and external walls, dated to the 14th–15th century. Beyond religious scenes and portraits, the paintings include a rare illustration of episodes from the epic romance on Amiran-Darejaniani. The church is inscribed on the list of the Immovable Cultural Monuments of National Significance of Georgia.

== Location ==
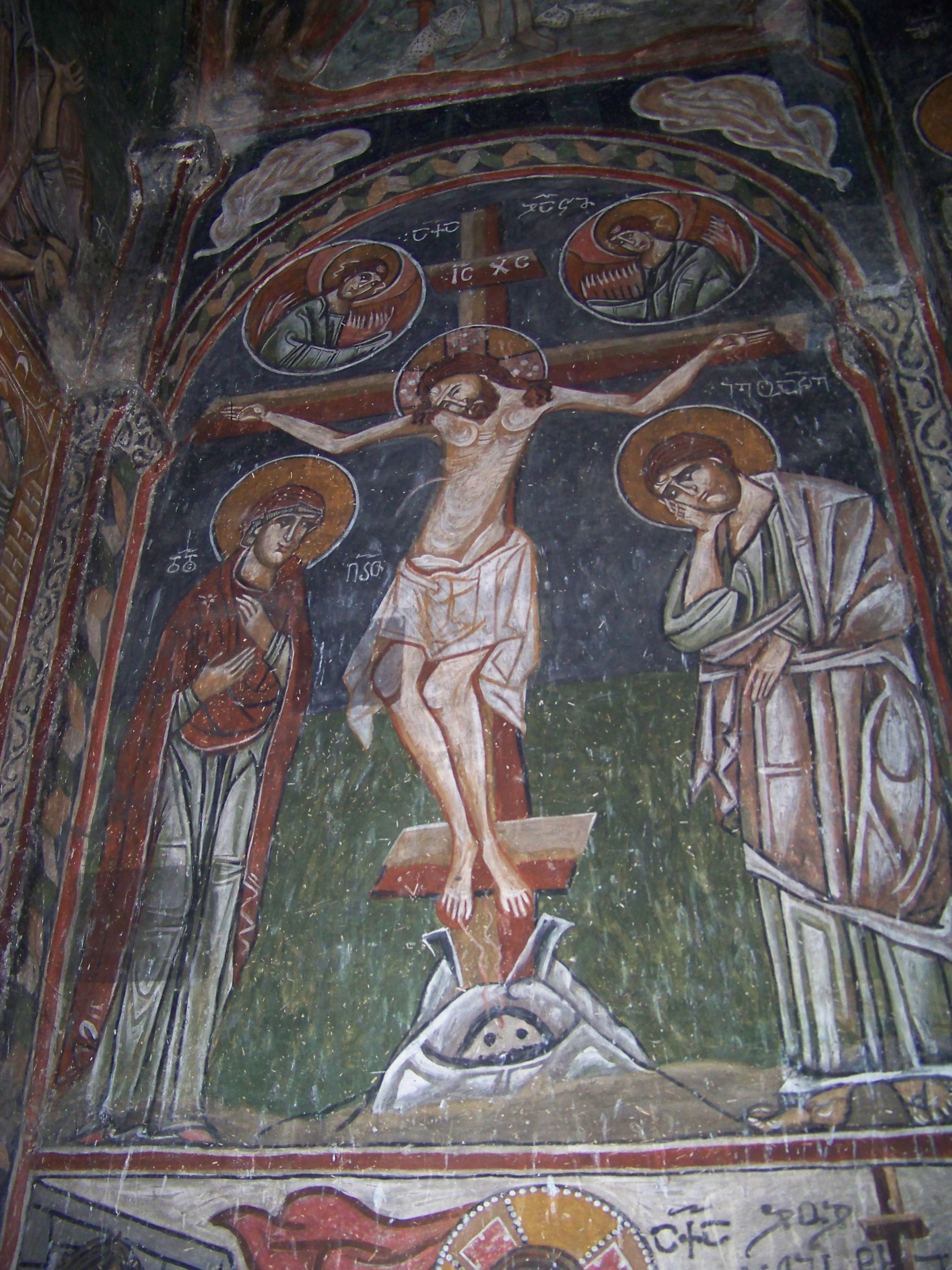
The Crucifixion, a fresco on the northern internal wall.

The Lashtkhveri church stands at the southwestern edge of the village of Lashtkhveri (Laštxver), at 1380 m above sea level, in the Lenjeri territorial unit of the Mestia Municipality, at the foothills of the Greater Caucasus. This part of Svaneti was known as Free Svaneti in the 19th century. There are no contemporary literary sources on the construction and history of Lashtkhveri. The church and the items preserved in it were first described, in details, by the scholar Ekvtime Taqaishvili during his expedition to Svaneti in 1910.

== Layout ==
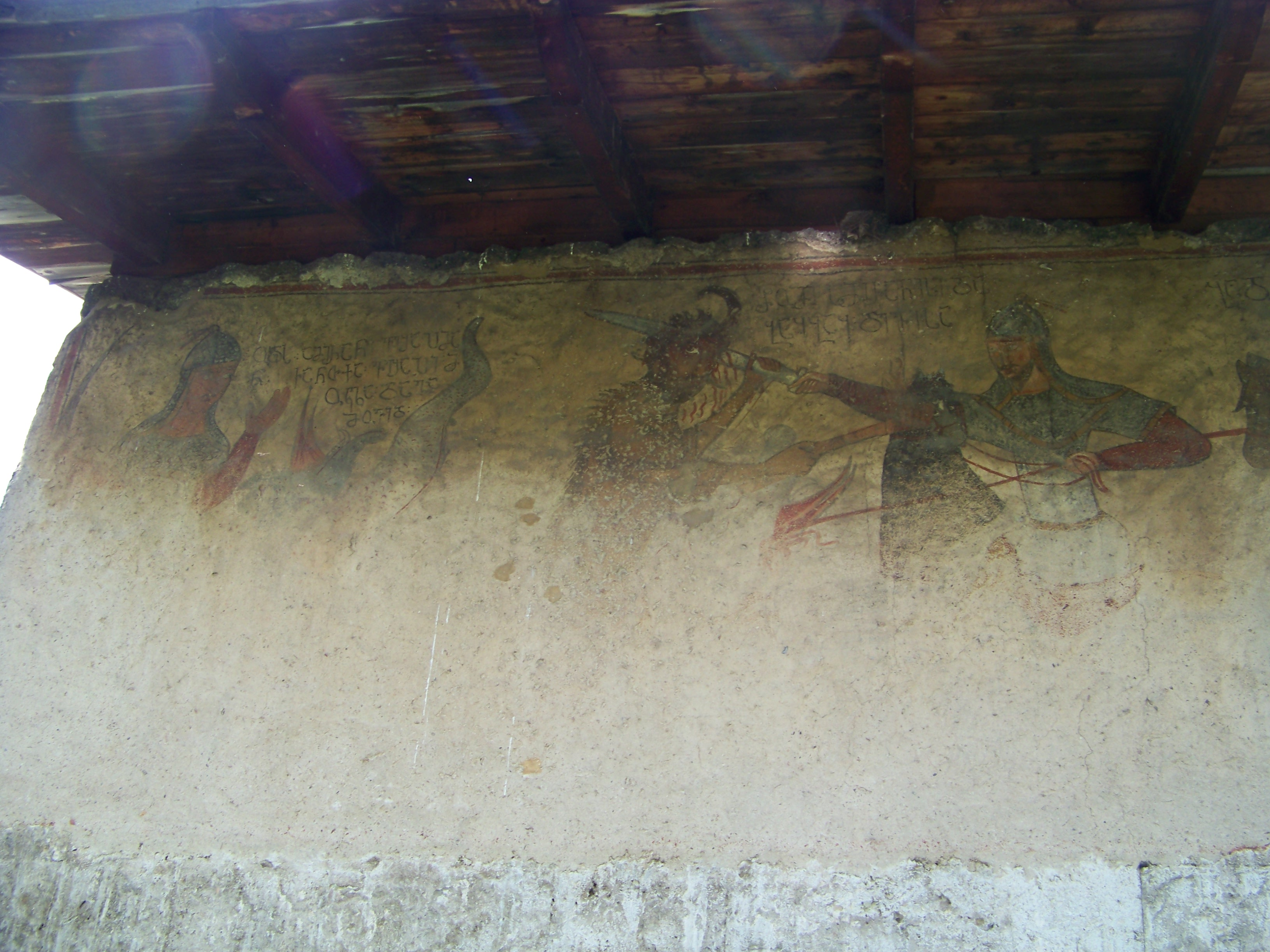
Amiran-Darejaniani, a fresco on the northern outer wall.

The Archangel is a small and architecturally simple hall church, based on a two-step socle and built of neatly cut limestone blocks. The nave is divided up into two nearly equal bays by a pair of arched pilasters. The building can be entered from the west through a rectangular doorway with an internal arched tympanum. The church is lit by four windows, cut one each in the sanctuary and west wall and two in the east wall, one of them shedding light directly on the fresco depiction of an equestrian Saint George on the opposing wall. The sanctuary contains two arched niches, on either side of the window. The window frames on the exterior are decorated in carved stonework. The church is crowned by a simple cornice. Annexed to the west wall is a chamber built at a later date and roofed with blocks of wood.

=== Frescoes ===
The church is avidly adorned with frescoes, dated to the latter half of the 14th century and beginning of the 15th. The style of the paintings is a local take on the late Byzantine Palaeologan art, executed in a characteristically coarse manner. Inside the building, the conch and walls bear a series of frescoes depicting a Christological cycle, Church Fathers, and various saints. The outer walls also contain frescoes—now partly faded—including the hunting of Saint Eustace on the east façade, haloed horsemen on the south, the Deesis on the west, and uniquely, scenes from the medieval Georgian romance Amiran-Darejaniani on the north. The paintings are accompanied by explanatory inscriptions in the medieval Georgian asomtavruli script.
