= NASA X-38 =

NASA experimental re-entry vehicle

X-38
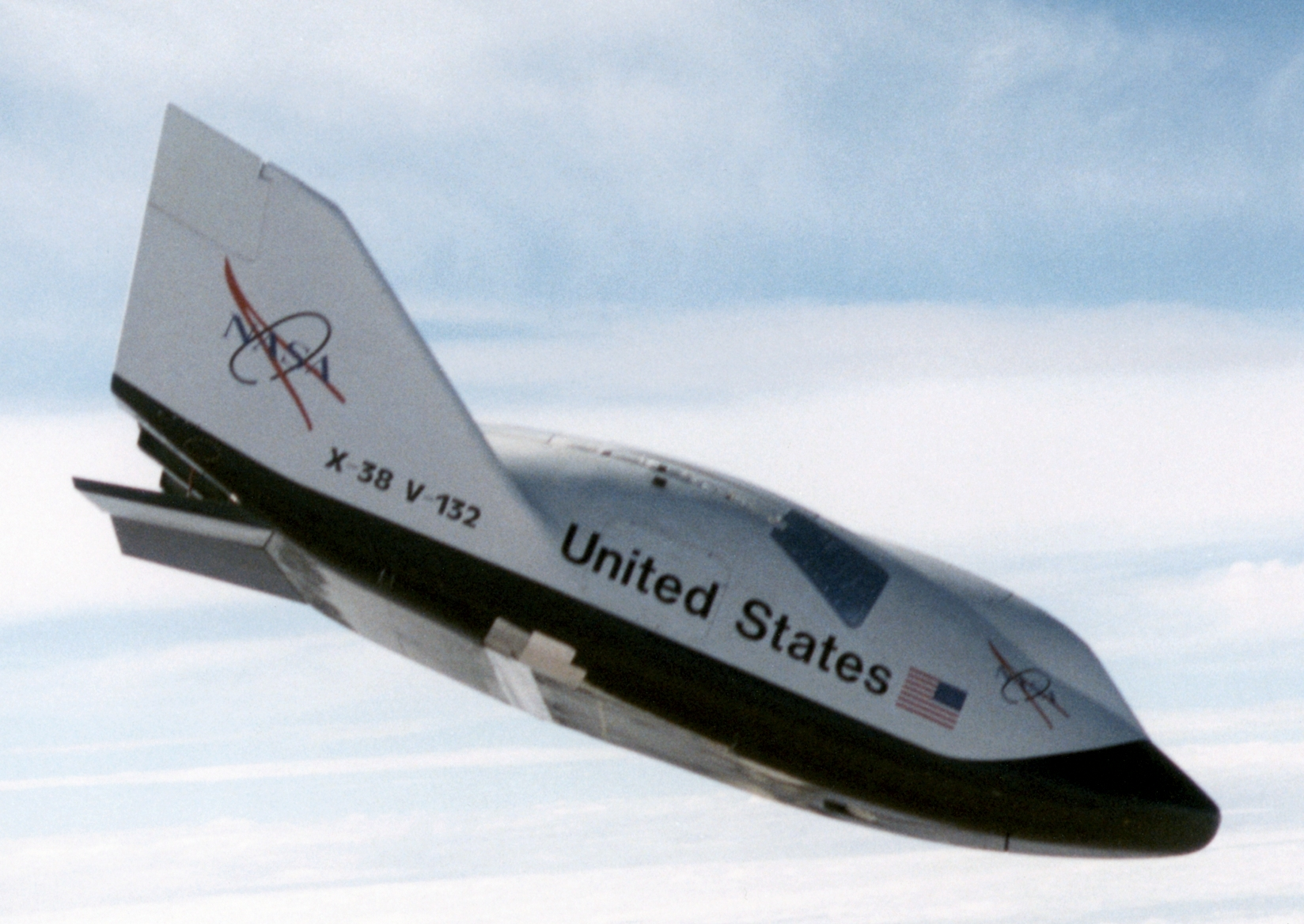
- X-38, Vehicle 132

General information
- Type: Crew Return Vehicle
- Designer: NASA, ESA, DLR, Dassault Aviation
- Built by: Scaled Composites (prototypes)
- Status: Canceled 29 April 2002
- Primary users: NASA ESA
- Number built: 2 atmospheric prototypes 1 orbital prototype (90 % complete)

History
- First flight: 1999
- Developed from: Martin-Marietta X-24

The X-38 is an experimental re-entry vehicle designed by NASA to research a possible emergency crew return vehicle (CRV) for the International Space Station (ISS). The 1995–2002 program also developed concepts for a crew return vehicle design that could be modified for other uses, such as a possible joint U.S. and international human spacecraft that could be launched on the European Ariane 5 booster.

The program would eventually develop a total of three test prototype flight demonstrators for the proposed Crew Return Vehicle, each having incremental improvements on its predecessor. All three were wingless lifting body vehicles used in drop tests. The X-38 program was canceled in 2002 due to budget cuts.

== History ==
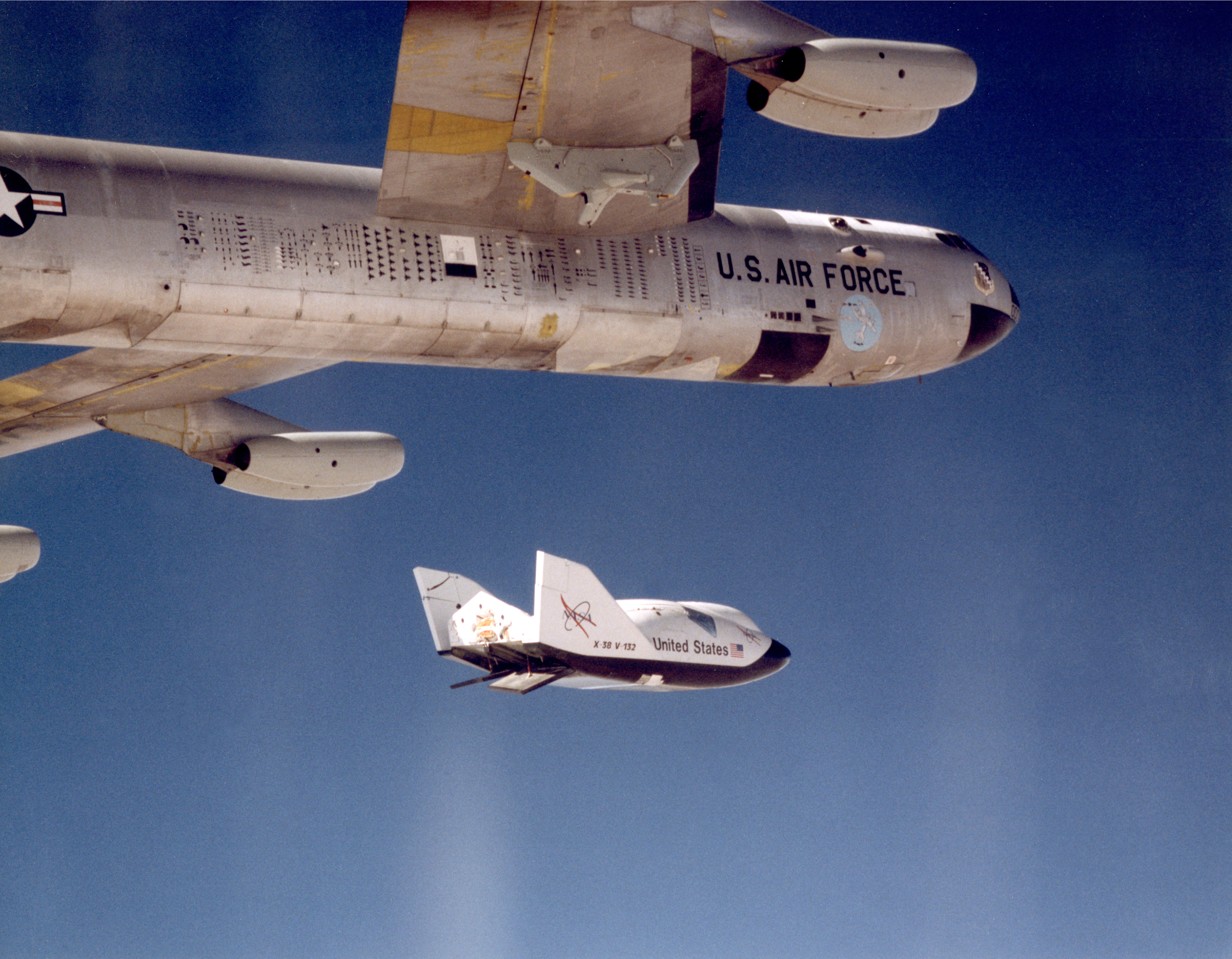
The X-38 V-132 research vehicle drops away from NASA's B-52 mothership immediately after being released from the wing pylon

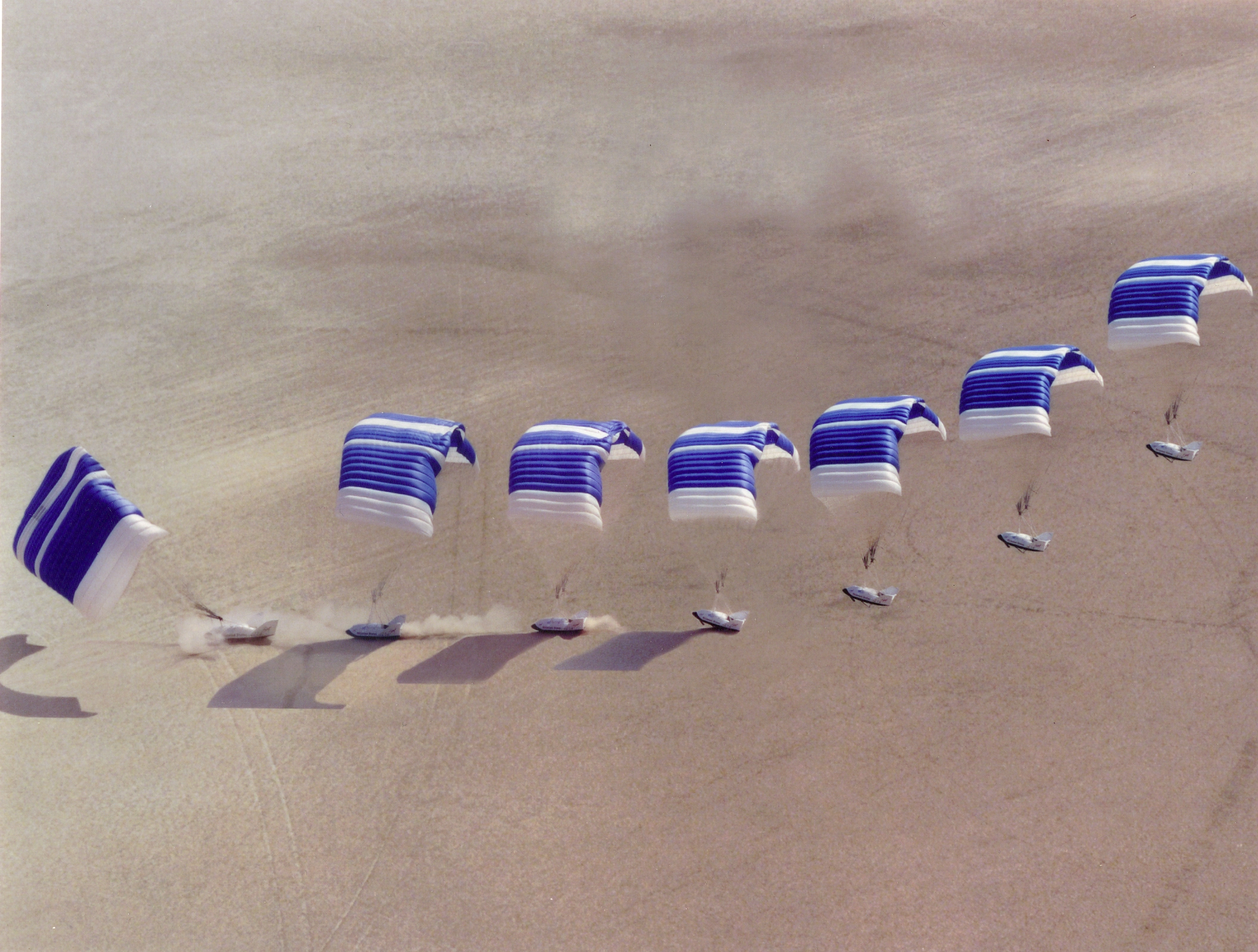
The X-38 CRV prototype makes a gentle lakebed landing at the end of a July 1999 test flight at the Dryden Flight Research Center with a fully deployed parafoil.

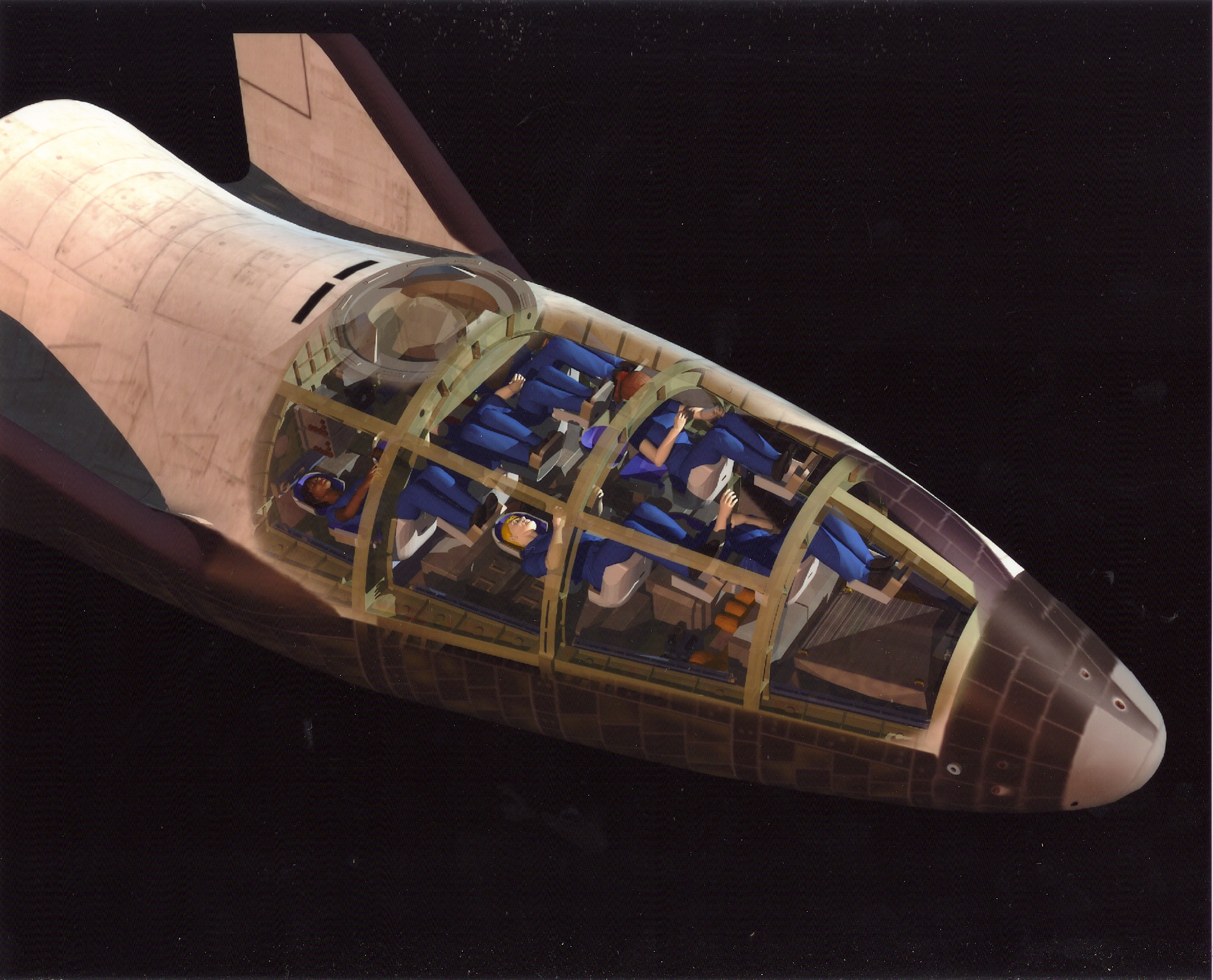
Graphical rendering of the X-38, with vehicle cutaway revealing 7-member crew's position during re-entry.

With crew being taken to the ISS by space shuttle, the maximum crew size for the ISS would be dependent on crew rescue capacity. Since it is imperative that the crew members be able to return to Earth in case of an unexpected emergency, a Crew Return Vehicle able to hold up to seven crew members was initially planned by the ISS program leadership. This would have allowed the full complement of seven astronauts to live and work on the ISS.

During the early years of ISS on-orbit construction, the crew was limited to three, corresponding to a single Russian Soyuz TMA vehicle that could be docked to the station at any given time. Later in May 2009 provisions were added for a total of two docked Soyuz vehicles simultaneously and the ISS crew was increased to 6 members. NASA has designed several crew return vehicles over the years with varying levels of detail.

A small, in-house development study of the X-38 concept first began at Johnson Space Center (JSC) in early 1995; however, several types of emergency scenarios were recognized by NASA as early as 1992 that drove the need for crew return from the International Space Station:

1. A serious illness or injury to a station astronaut
2. A fire or collision with space debris
3. Grounding of the space shuttle so that it could not deliver life-sustaining supplies.

In early 1996, a contract was awarded to Scaled Composites, Inc., of Mojave, Calif., for the construction of three full-scale atmospheric test airframes. The first vehicle airframe was delivered to JSC in September 1996.

== Development ==
In an unusual move for an X-plane, the program involved the European Space Agency and the German Space Agency DLR. It was originally called X-35. The program manager was John Muratore, while the Flight Test Engineer was future NASA astronaut Michael E. Fossum.

Rob Meyerson, who later went on to become President of Blue Origin, was an early member of the team.

The X-38 design used a wingless lifting body concept originally developed by the U.S. Air Force in the mid-1960s during the X-24 program. R. Dale Reed worked for NASA from 1955 to 2000 and is considered the Father of the Lifting Body Programs. He met with Muratore (1992–93) and shared his design of the X-24A that he used to present the concept of the X-38 to NASA (Wingless Flight, Chapter 9, pages 186–88).

The X-38 program used uncrewed mockups to test the CRV design. Flight models were indicated with the letter V for "Vehicle" followed by a number.

- X-38 V-131
- X-38 V-132
- X-38 V-131-R, which was the V-131 prototype reworked with a modified shell.
- X-38 V-201, which was an orbital prototype to be launched by the Space Shuttle.
- X-38 V-121, V-133 and V-301 were also foreseen, but were never built.

The X-38 V-131 and V-132 shared the aerodynamic shape of the X-24A. This shape had to be enlarged for the Crew Return Vehicle needs (crew of seven astronauts) and redesigned, especially in the rear part, which became thicker.

The X-38 V-131-R was designed at 80 percent of the size of a CRV [24.5 ft (7.5 m) long, 11.6 ft (3.5 m) wide, 8.4 ft (2.6 m) high], and featured the final redesigned shape (Two later versions, V-133 and V-201, were planned at 100 percent of the CRV size). The 80% scale versions were flown at 15,000 to 24,000 pound weight. The X-38 V-201 orbital prototype was 90 percent complete, but never flown.

In drop tests the V-131, V-132 and V-131-R were dropped by a B-52 from altitudes of up to 45,000 ft (13,700 m), gliding at near transonic speeds before deploying a drogue parachute to slow them to 60 miles per hour (97 km/h). The later prototypes had their descent continue under a 7,500-square-foot (700 m^{2}) parafoil wing, the largest ever made. Flight control was mostly autonomous, backed up by a ground-based pilot.

X-38: Low-Cost, High-Tech Space Rescue

== Design ==
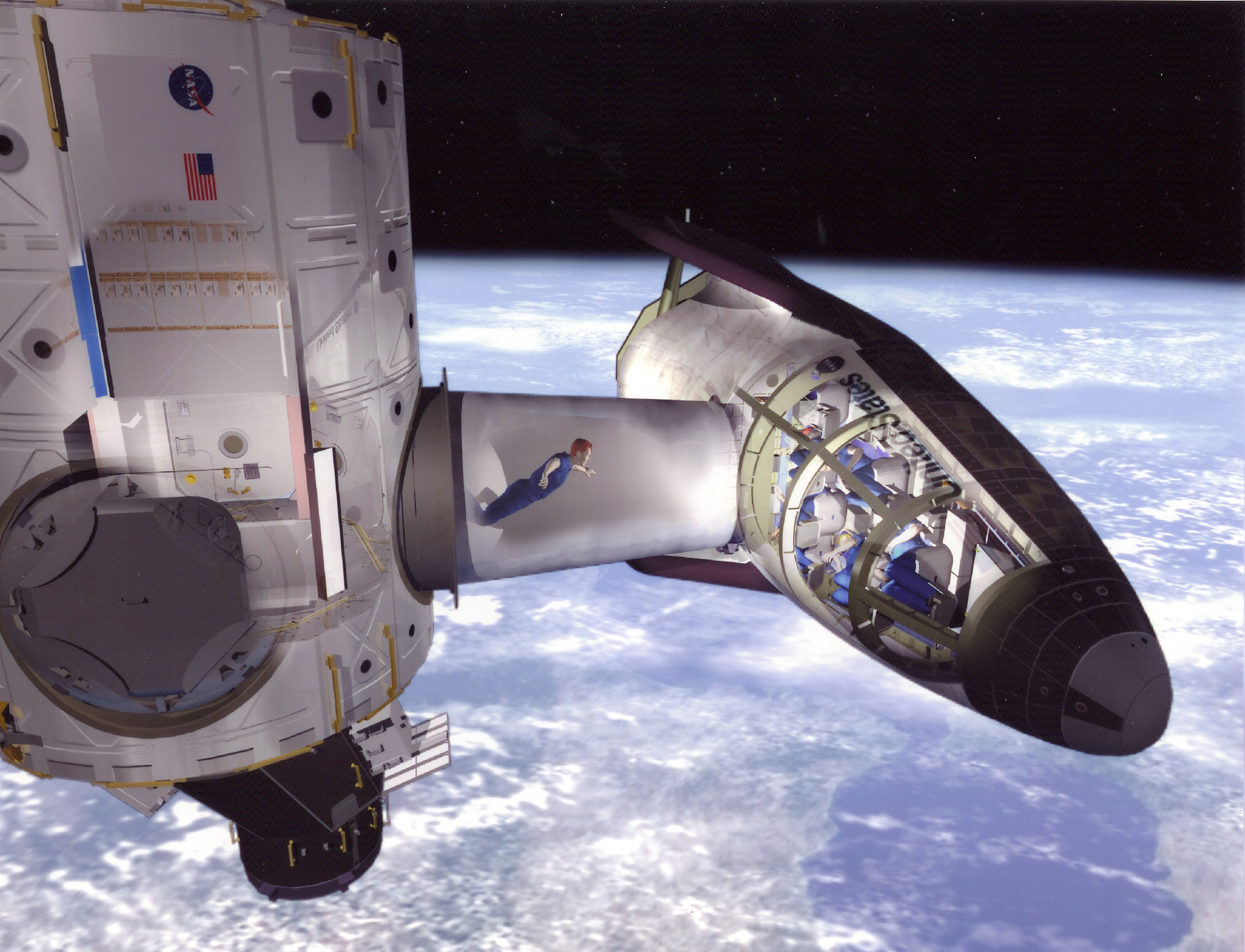
Artist's rendering of a docked X-38 being ingressed by a crew member through a docking mechanism.

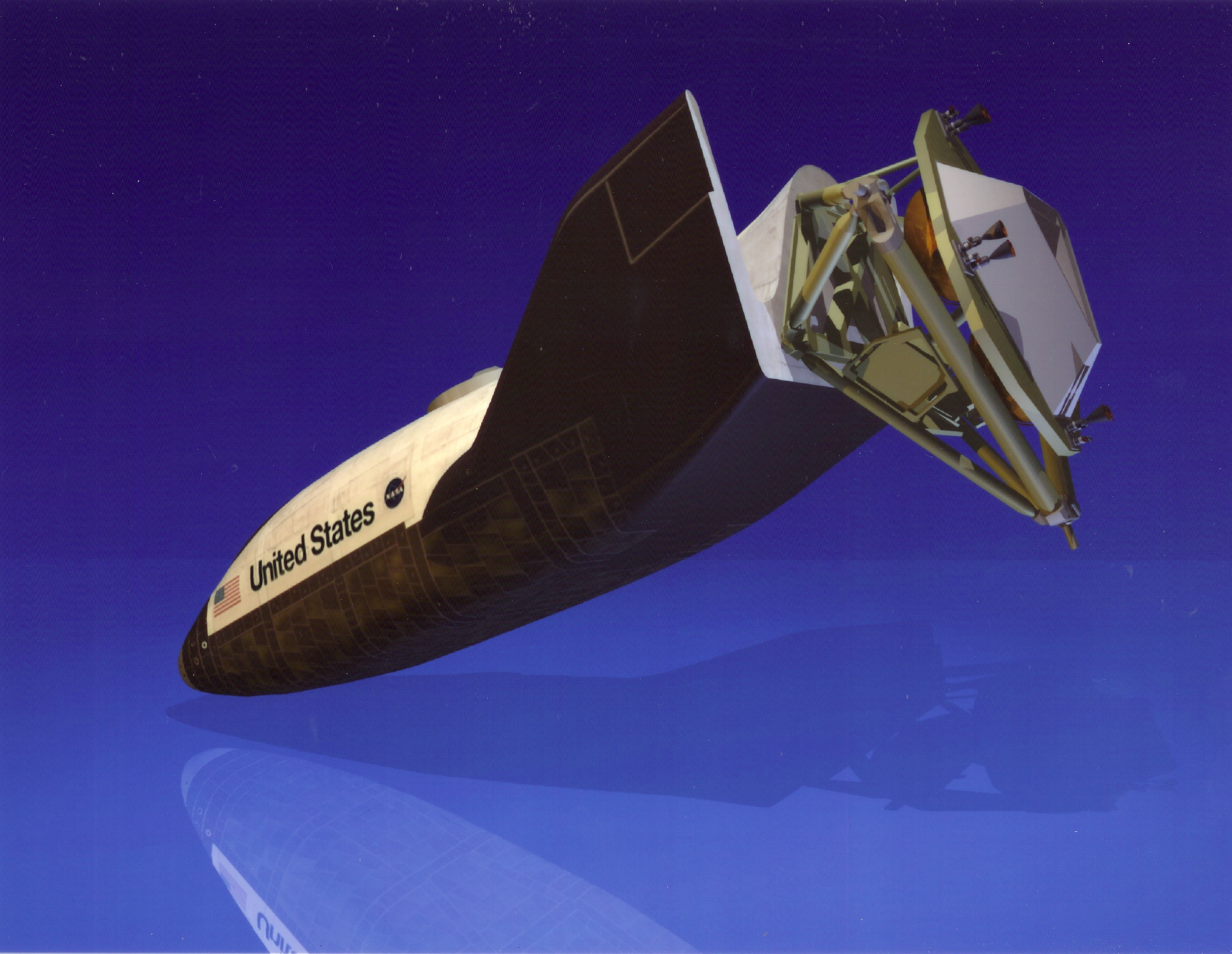
Conceptual depiction of the deorbital propulsion system (DPS) attached to the rear of a crew return vehicle. The DPS would fire its eight thrusters to slow the spacecraft to below orbital velocity in order to re-enter Earth's atmosphere.

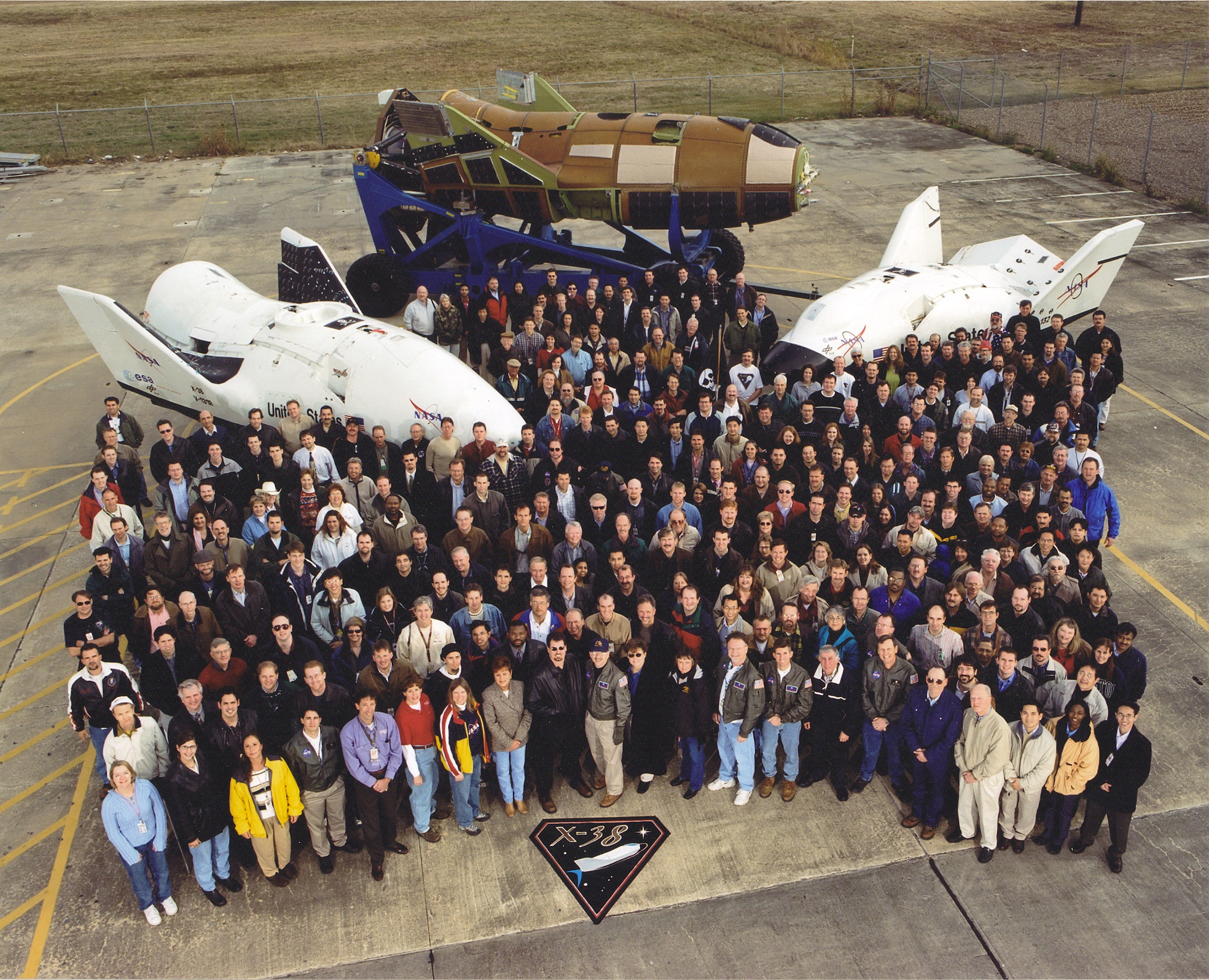
The X-38 Development Team with V131R, V132, and V201 on the east side of B220 at the Johnson Space Center at the close of the project (2002)

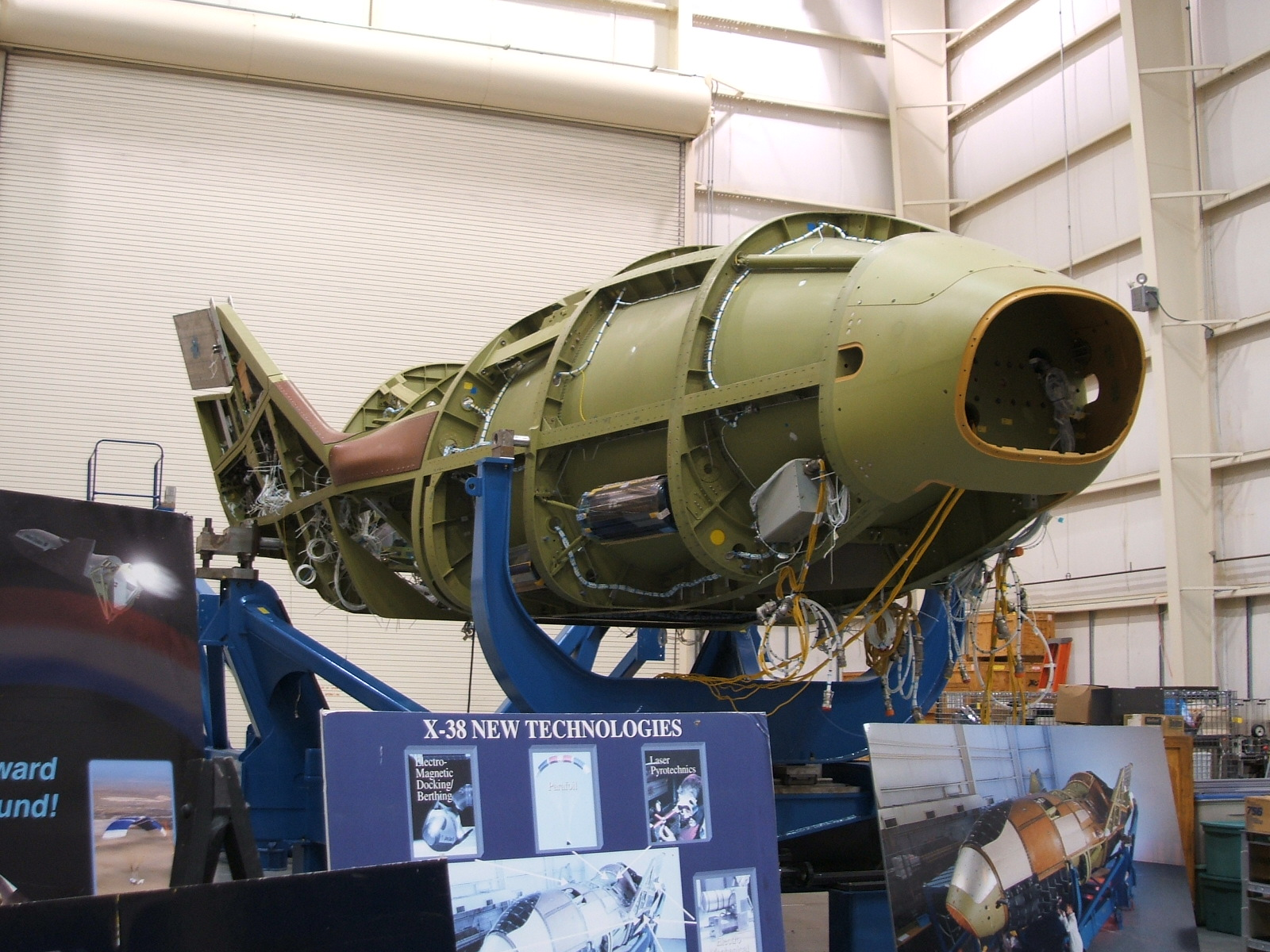
X-38 V-201 orbital test vehicle previously located at Bldg. 220 at Johnson Space Center. Now held in the South end of Building 10, Houston, Texas

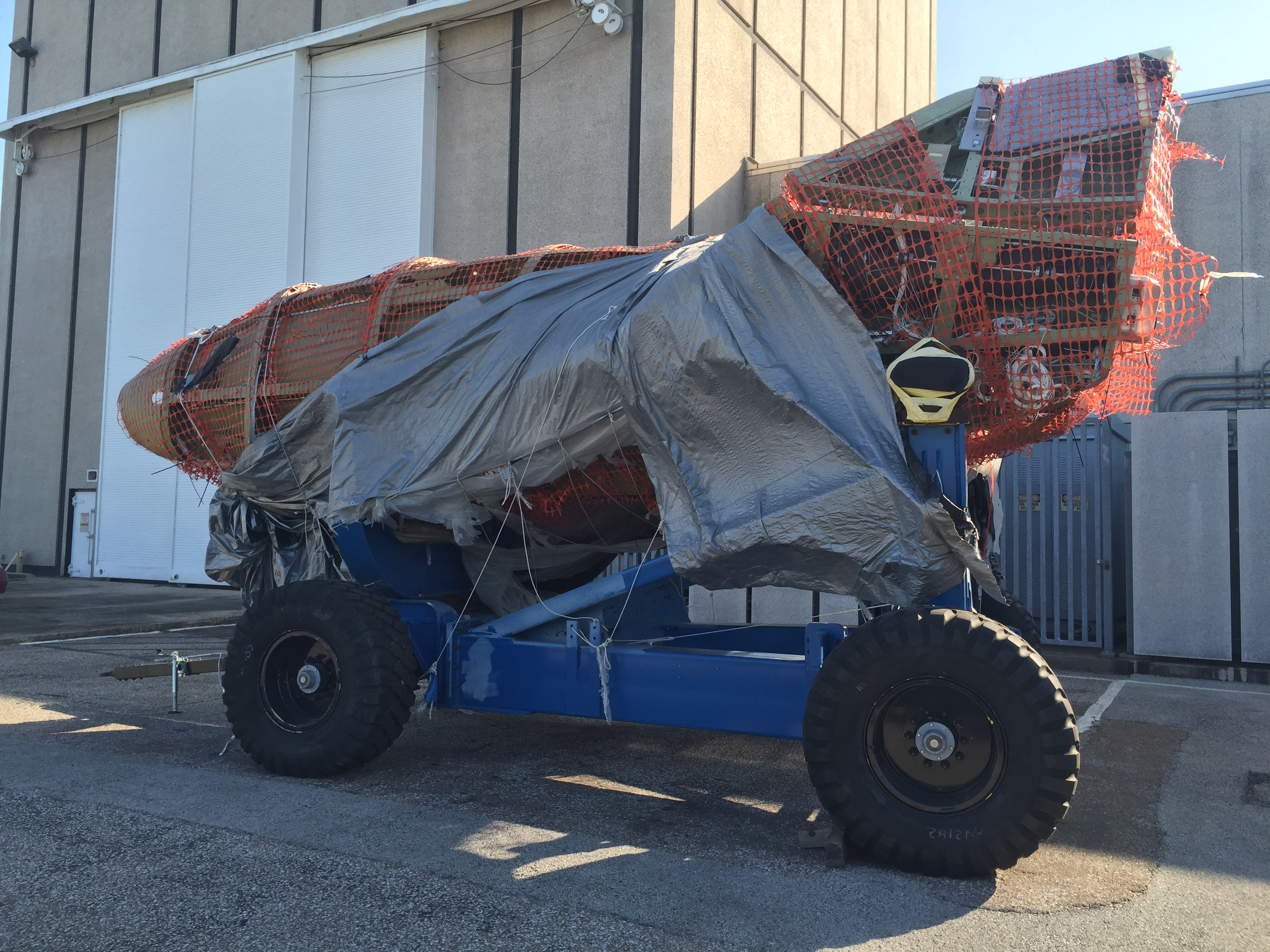
X-38 V-201 orbital test vehicle as currently displayed atop its ground mobility carrier at NASA-Johnson Space Center behind Building 49.

The fifth test drop flight of X-38. The aircraft is released from a B-52 mothership, free falls for a while, opens and fully deploys the parafoil and finally makes a gentle landing

The X-38 was intended to be semi-permanently docked to the ISS. If the crew became sick or injured during the course of their mission, they would enter the rescue vehicle through a hatched docking mechanism. With execution of a short procedure, the crew return vehicles would automatically fly the crew members safely to Earth. Once undocked, the vehicle would be deorbited using a deorbital propulsion system (DPS). The eight-thruster DPS would adjust the spacecraft's attitude and retrofire to slow the X-38 down, allowing gravitational attraction to pull it back into Earth's atmosphere. A DPS module was developed by Aerojet and delivered to Johnson Space Center in 2002 for V-201.

Following the jettison of the DPS, the X-38 would have glided from orbit and used a steerable parafoil for its final descent and landing. The high speeds at which lifting body aircraft operate can make them challenging to land. The parafoil would have been used to slow the vehicle and make landing easier. The landing gear consisted of skids rather than wheels: the skids worked like sleds so the vehicle would have slid to a stop on the ground.

Both the shape and size of the X-38 were different from that of the Space Shuttle. The Crew Return Vehicle would have fitted into the payload bay of the shuttle. This does not, however, mean that it would have been small. The X-38 weighed 10,660 kg and was 9.1 meters long. The battery system, lasting nine hours, was to be used for power and life support. If the Crew Return Vehicle was needed, it would only take two to three hours for it to reach Earth.

The parafoil parachute, employed for landing, was derived from technology developed by the U.S. Army. This massive parafoil deploys in 5 stages for optimum performance. A drag chute would have been released from the rear of the X-38. This drag chute would have been used to stabilize and slow the vehicle down. The parafoil (area of 687 square meters) was then released. It would open in five steps (a process called staging). While the staging process only takes 45 seconds, it is important for a successful chute deployment. Staging prevents high-speed winds from tearing the parafoil.

The spacecraft's landing was to be completely automated. Mission Control would have sent coordinates to the onboard computer system. This system would also have used wind sensors and the Global Positioning System (a satellite-based coordinate system) to coordinate a safe trip home. Since the Crew Return Vehicle was designed with medical emergencies in mind, it made sense that the vehicle could find its way home automatically in the event that crew members were incapacitated or injured. If there was a need, the crew would have the capability to operate the vehicle by switching to the backup systems. In addition, seven high-altitude low-opening (HALO) parachute packs were included in the crew cabin, a measure designed to provide for the ability to bail out of the craft.

An Advanced Docking Berthing System (ADBS) was designed for the X-38 and the work on it led to the Low Impact Docking System the Johnson Space Center later created for the planned vehicles in Project Constellation.

The X-38 vehicle was also known as the X-35 (but that designation was already allocated by the USAF to Lockheed Martin's entry in the Joint Strike Fighter Program) and the X-CRV (experimental - Crew Return Vehicle).

== Cancellation ==
Severe cost overruns plagued the ISS program during its development and construction during the late 1990s and early 2000s. To bring costs under control the International Space Station Management and Cost Evaluation (IMCE) Task Force was created. The task force introduced a new concept known as "American Core Complete", whereby the U.S. would unilaterally reduce the previously agreed-upon American contributions to the ISS while retaining its role as the controlling member of the International partners. Core Complete (as opposed to the originally planned "Station Complete") deleted the American Habitation Module, the American CRV, and Node-3 from the ISS design without any negotiations with international partners. NASA Administrator, Sean O'Keefe, appointed by President George W. Bush, stated in December 2001 that he intended to adhere to the recommendations of the IMCE, including the implementation of Core Complete. The X-38 project cancellation was announced on April 29, 2002 as a cost-cutting measure in accordance with the IMCE's recommendations.

The Core Complete concept was roundly criticized by many experts at the time since a majority of development work on the X-38 had been completed. The prototype space vehicle was approximately 90% complete at the time it was cancelled.

== Legacy and vehicle redeployment ==
The X-38 V-132 is now on permanent loan from NASA to the Strategic Air Command & Aerospace Museum at Ashland, Nebraska.

As of October 2015 the 90% complete X-38 V-201, having been moved out of Building 220 at Johnson Space Center, is now sitting outside Building 49 wrapped in construction webbing at Johnson Space Center.

As of January 2024, the X-38 V-131R is on loan from NASA to the North American Aerospace Museum in McMinnville, Oregon.

== Specifications ==
Data from

General characteristics

- Crew: Seven astronauts
- Length: 30 ft (9.1 m)
- Wingspan: 14 ft 6 in (4.42 m)
- Height: 7 ft 3 in (2.22 m)
- Empty weight: 23,500 lb (10,659 kg)
- Gross weight: 25,000 lb (11,340 kg)

== See also ==
- Crew Return Vehicle
- International Space Station
- Lifting body
- Pioneer Aerospace Corporation

Related development

- Martin Marietta X-24
- HiMAT Remotely Piloted Vehicle

Aircraft of comparable role, configuration, and era

- NASA M2-F1
- Northrop M2-F2
- Northrop M2-F3
- Northrop HL-10
- MiG-105
- SpaceDev Dream Chaser
