= Pioneer Aerospace Corporation =

American manufacturer of aerodynamic decelerator systems

Pioneer Aerospace Corporation is one of the largest aerodynamic deceleration manufacturers in the world. Since 1938, the company has designed and manufactured parachutes and parafoils for use by the military, leisure use and numerous NASA missions. Pioneer's main factory and distribution centers are located in Columbia, Mississippi and Bloomfield, Connecticut.

== History ==
The Pioneer Parachute Company was formed in 1938, by Connecticut silk manufacturers Cheney Mills. James Floyd Smith, inventor of the modern parachute, was one of the founders of the new company.

Pioneer partnered with DuPont to use the recently developed Nylon as an alternative to silk, and experimented with chute properties and optimised packing over the next 4 years. In June 1942, Adeline Grey was the first person to successfully test the human-rated parachute. This led to Pioneer becoming the world's leading manufacturer of parachutes, producing 300 per day at the height of World War II.

A Canadian subsidiary The Pioneer Parachute Company of Canada Ltd operated in Smiths Falls, Ontario. Canada from 1954 until 1962.

=== Aerospace ===
After the war, the company started to develop applications for the growing aerospace sector. In 1962, Pioneer bought the rights to the newly invented "Parasail", and tested this as a landing method for the Gemini spacecraft.

Pioneer subsequently produced chutes for many NASA spaceflight programmes, including Mercury, Gemini, the Galileo probe, the Space Shuttle, the Mars Pathfinder missions, the Genesis solar-sample mission, the Stardust Comet Intercept Probe, and the Mars Exploration Rovers.

In 1999, Pioneer manufactured, at the time, the world's largest parafoil (7,500 square ft.) for the X-38 Crew Return Vehicle, an emergency return capsule for the crew of the International Space Station.

In 2020, it was revealed that Pioneer manufactured the drogue parachutes for SpaceX's Crew Dragon spacecraft.

=== Company transfers ===
The company was subsequently renamed Pioneer Aerodynamic Systems and Pioneer Systems, and by 1988 was known as Pioneer Aerospace

In 1988, Pioneer become a part of Zodiac's Aerosafety Systems Group. On December 1, 2018 Safran acquired Zodiac Aerospace as Safran Aerosystems.

In June 2022, Aviation Safety Resource acquired Pioneer from Safran.

On November 1, 2023, Pioneer Aerospace Corporation filed for Chapter 11 bankruptcy. A week later, the company filed a purchase agreement for SpaceX to buy all assets of Pioneer, including intellectual property relating to drogue chutes, and specifically those produced for SpaceX under contract. On November 22, 2023, the $2.2 million acquisition by SpaceX was approved by the bankruptcy court.
