= Black Moses =

Black Moses may refer to:

== People ==
- Black Musa (1880–1919), Ottoman soldier
- (St.) Moses the Black (330–405), Ethiopian religious leader
- Harriet Tubman (c. 1822–1913), African-American anti-slavery activist
- David Hamilton Jackson (1884–1946), Danish W. Indies labor rights advocate
- Marcus Garvey (1887–1940), Jamaican pan-africanism leader and Rastafari prophet

== Other uses ==
- Black Moses (album), a 1971 album by Isaac Hayes
- The Black Moses, a 2014 Bahamian documentary film
- Moses the Black (film), a 2026 American crime drama film

== See also ==
- Moses (disambiguation)
