= Statue of Moses (University of Notre Dame) =

Statue in the U.S. state of Indiana

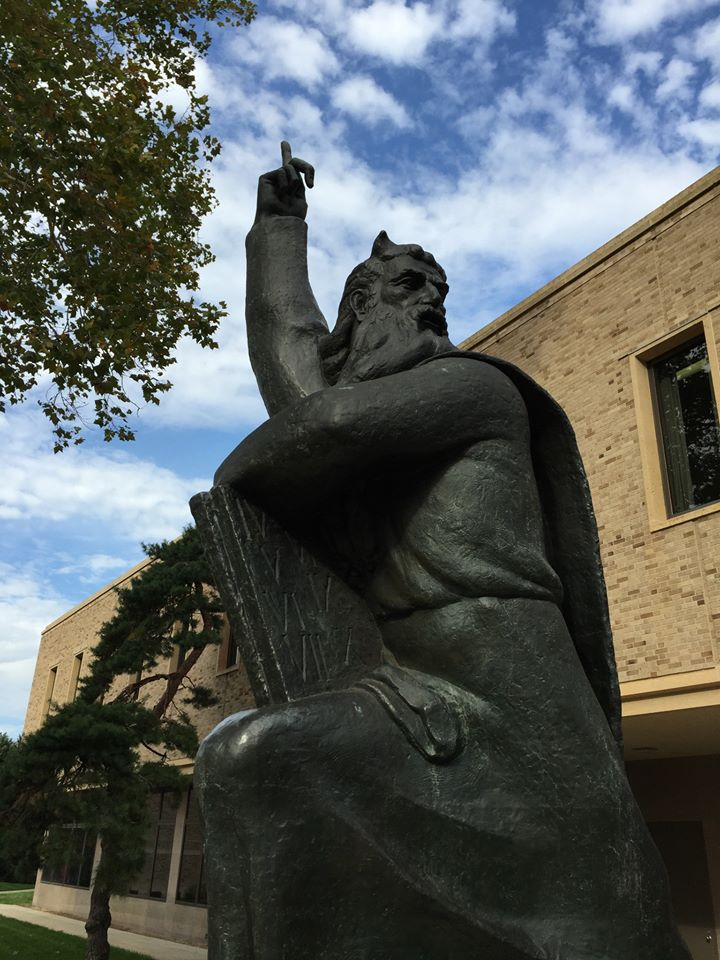
- Artist: Josip Turkalj
- Year: 1962
- Type: Plaster cast in Bronze
- Dimensions: 520 cm (17 ft)
- Location: University of Notre Dame; Notre Dame, Indiana, United States; 41°42′09″N 86°14′05″W
- Owner: University of Notre Dame

Statue of Moses, commonly referred to as First Down Moses, is an outdoor sculpture by Croatian artist Josip Turkalj on the University of Notre Dame campus in Notre Dame, Indiana. The sculpture, made of bronze, depicts Moses. Commissioned in 1962, the sculpture is located just outside of the Hesburgh Library and is owned by the University of Notre Dame.

== Description ==
Moses is a 17 ft sculpture with a 3inch tall bronze base and a 1.3 feet tall granite square base. It is located in the West side of Hesburgh Library located at the North quad of Notre Dame campus. The sculpture was made by Josep Turkjali in plaster and was sent to Italy to be cast in bronze. It is composed of the image of Moses pointing a finger to the sky with the table of commandments in the other hand. It is also stepping over a bull and represented with horns in its head.

== Historical information ==
Moses was created by Croatian sculptor Josip Turkalj. He was influenced by his mentor Ivan Meštrović who "Moses was the figure to which he most often returned." The sculpture was created at Notre Dame in plaster and then sent to Italy to be cast in bronze.

The sculpture represents Moses lecturing the Israelites, who in his absence had fallen into idolatry. Moses' hand is pointing into the sky to proclaim that there is only one God. As Notre Dame has a long history of renaming statues with football reference, Moses has been awarded the name of First Down Moses. Much like the South panel of the Hesburgh Library which was known as "Touchdown Jesus" or the statue of Father Corby that is nicknamed Fair Catch Corby. First Down Moses, according to students, also signals that the Notre Dame football team is number one, hence the statue's hand pointing to the sky.

One of the controversies that exist surrounding the sculpture is the representation of Moses with horns in is head. Initially it was thought to be "a mistranslation, because the Hebrew word for horns can also refer to rays of light." Nevertheless, as scholars have continued to research they have come to the conclusion that the representation of Moses with horns may have been "referring to one of the most famous depictions of Moses in sculpture, the early-16th century statue by Michelangelo that forms part of the tomb of Pope Julius II."
