= Saint Moses =

Saint Moses may refer to:

- Moses (bishop of the Arabs) (c. 389), first Arab bishop of the Arab people
- Moses the Black (330–405) ascetic monk and priest in Egypt, a Desert Father
- Moses of Sinai, two holy fathers slain at Sinai and Raithu
- Moses the Hungarian (990s–1043), Russian saint
- Moses of Novgorod (died 1362), bishop, Eastern Orthodox saint
