= Mozes (surname) =

Mozes is a surname. Notable people with the surname include:

- Arnon Mozes (born 1953), Israeli media businessman
- Dan Mozes (born 1983), American former professional football center
- Emese Mózes-Rácz (born 1983) a former Hungarian handballer
- Eva Mozes Kor (1934–2019), a Romanian-born American survivor of the Holocaust
- Judy Shalom Nir-Mozes (born 1958), Israeli socialite, investor and talk show host
- Shahar Mozes, an Israeli mathematician

== See also ==
- Moze (disambiguation)
- Mozes (given name)
- Mozes (disambiguation)
- Mozes (given name)
