= Louie Moses =

Advertising executive

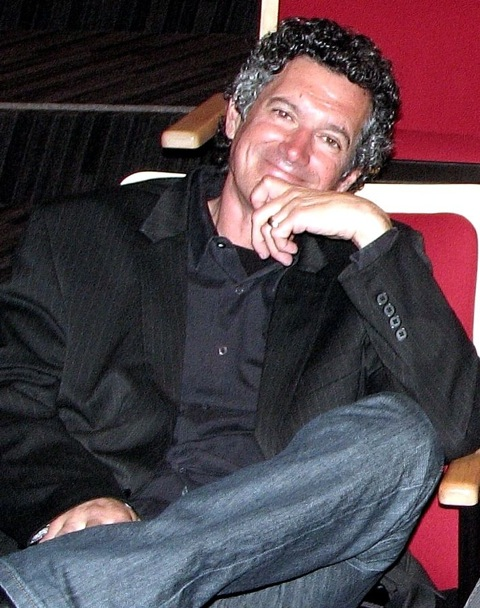
- Moses in October 2012
- Born: Louie Moses
- Occupation: Advertising Executive

Louie Moses is the founder and creative director of Moses, an independently owned American advertising agency in Phoenix. Fast Company (magazine) referred to him as the "poster child for creativity" in Phoenix. His agency is the first Arizona advertising agency to win at the Clio Awards.

== Career ==
Moses is best known for creating the Joe Boxer "Naked Cowboy" TV spot.

He is also known for his work for The Arizona Humane Society, US Airways, The Arizona Office of Tourism, Nintendo, Ubisoft, Taco Time and Shutters on the Beach Hotel.

He was selected as Ad Person of the Year in 1997. He was selected as Tourism Person of the Year in 2000. He has been the only Arizona member of the Art Directors Club of New York for 20 years. His agency, Moses, has won more than 1000 creative awards, more than any other agency in Arizona.

In 2013, his agency was recognized nationally when it was chosen as the number one advertising agency in Arizona by Adweek. That same year, his agency was selected by Ultimate Gaming to launch Ultimate Casino – a real-money online casino in New Jersey.
