= Mosè Turri =

Italian painter (1837–1903)

Mosè Turri (1837–1903) was an Italian painter.

He was born and was a resident in Milan. He painted mainly animals and still-lives of fruits and flowers. In 1881, he exhibited at Milan: Una sorpresa; Animali; Natura morta; in 1884 in Turin: Fiori, and Selvaggina.
