= Mose Khoneli =

12th-century Georgian writer

Mose Khoneli (Georgian: მოსე ხონელი) or Moses of Khoni was a 12th-century Georgian writer active during the reign of Queen Tamar (c. 1184-1213). He is believed to be author of one of the most important works of medieval Georgian romance and epic poetry Amiran-Darejaniani.
