= William Moses (businessman) =

American entrepreneur and investor

William "Bill" Daniel Moses Jr. (born July 27, 1962) is an American entrepreneur and investor, specializing in the beverage industry. He is the co-founder of Kevita, a probiotic beverage company. He is currently Founder & CEO of Flying Embers, an alcoholic beverage line made of adaptogenic organic "hard" kombucha.

== Early life and career ==
Moses was born on July 27, 1962, in Homestead, Pennsylvania. Moses graduated from the University of Virginia in 1985 and started a career in finance and investment banking.

In 1997, Moses became the co-founder and CEO of Recovery Television Network and RNetHealth.com, a JV with Liberty Media, later sold to Liberty Media.

== Business ventures ==
Moses co-founded KeVita, Inc. in 2009 and served as its Chairman and CEO. KeVita provided the healthy beverage sector with a sparkling, probiotic functional beverage and kombucha for health-conscious consumers.

Bill developed KeVita from a small, regional brand to an international leader selling to 20,000+ retail locations across North America. Under his leadership, KeVita earned consistent recognition as a high–growth brand, transforming the functional beverage space. PepsiCo acquired Kevita for $220 million in 2016.

In 2016, Moses founded the R&D company, Fermented Sciences Inc. Moses next joined Whipstitch Capital in 2017 as the company's Senior Operating and Strategic Advisor. He was then named Executive Chairman of ICONIC Protein Drink in September 2017.

In 2018, Moses joined the board of directors of Koia, manufacturer of a plant-based, protein beverage.

Moses is a strategic advisor, principal shareholder and board member of Wilde Brands, Vive Organic Wellness Shots, and Yooga Superfood Cup.

Moses is the Founder and Chairman of the Board of the Personalized Health Association, a federal 501 c4 advocacy organization.

== Awards and recognition ==
Recipient of the Ellis Island Medal of Honor by the National Ethnic Coalition of Organizations (NECO) for his outstanding citizenship, individual achievements and encouragements of cultural unity.

Named Honorary Chair of Cable Positive, a 501c3 that raised the awareness of AIDS via the media.

Moses is a member of the Board of Directors for the World Business Academy a non-profit and think tank in Santa Barbara, CA that advises business on environmental and social issues.
