= Viviane Mosé =

Brazilian writer and poet

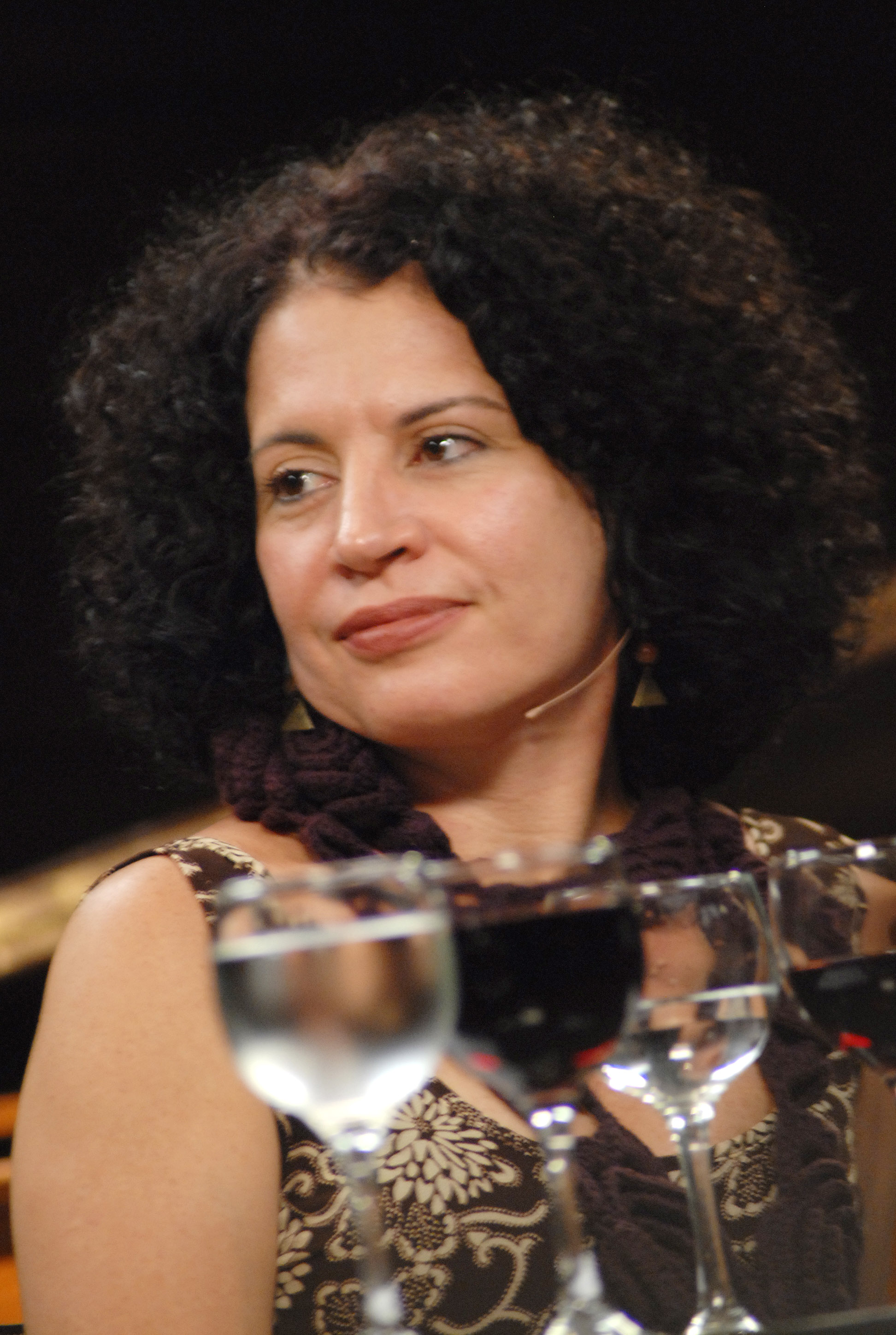
- Viviane Mosé in 2008
- Born: 6 January 1964 (age 62); Vitória, Espírito Santo, Brazil
- Occupations: Writer, philosopher, psychologist, psychoanalyst.

Viviane Mosé (born 16 January 1964) is a Brazilian poet, philosopher, psychologist, psychoanalyst and public policy consultant. She received a Ph.D. from the Federal University of Rio de Janeiro's Institute of Philosophy and Social Sciences. She published her doctoral thesis, Nietzsche e a grande política da linguagem in 2005, through the Civilização Brasileira publishing house.

Mosé wrote and presented, from 2005 to 2006, the segment Ser ou não ser, on the television program Fantástico, on which she presented philosophy concepts in an informal manner. She wrote a number of poetry, philosophy and psychoanalysis books. Mosé is associate and content director of Usina Pensamento, commentator on the Rádio CBN program Liberdade de Expressão, together with Carlos Heitor Cony and Artur Xexéo.

She is also a consultant for Encontro com Fátima Bernardes TV show.

== Works ==
Poetry

- Toda Palavra, (2008);
- Pensamento chão, (2007);
- Desato, (2006);
- Receita para lavar palavra suja, (2004);
- Escritos, (1990);
- Imagem Escrita, (1999);
- 7 + 1, Francisco Alves (1997).

Philosophy and psychoanalysis

- A Escola e Os Desafios Contemporâneos, (2013);
- O Homem que Sabe, (2011);
- Nietzsche e a grande política da linguagem, (2005);
- Beleza, feiúra e psicanálise, (2004);
- Stela do Patrocínio - Reino dos bichos e dos animais é o meu nome, (2002);
- Assim Falou Nietzsche, (1999).
