= Charonne Mose =

Canadian choreographer, creative director and dancer

- Born: Toronto, Ontario, Canada
- Other name: Charonne Mose
- Education: Masters in Competitive Business Intelligence; Bachelor of Science
- Alma mater: Georgetown University and Fashion Institute of Technology
- Occupations: Choreographer; Art director; Dancer
- Known for: Emmy Award; Addy Award; Webby Award
- Children: Kaaya Talia Bufford (daughter)
- Parents: Dr. Kenrick Mose (father); Charmion Mose (mother)

Charonne Mose is an Emmy Award winning Choreographer, dancer and Webby Award winning Creative and UX Director, who now resides in Washington, DC.

== Early years ==
Charonne was born in Toronto, Ontario, Canada, the middle of three daughters to Dr. Kenrick Mose and Charmion Mose, both originally from Trinidad and Tobago. Charonne went on to earn a degree from the Fashion Institute of Technology, where she graduated magna cum laude. After working in the fashion industry for two years, Charonne decided to seriously pursue a dance career and eventually moved to Los Angeles. She has danced and choreographed in New York, Europe and Los Angeles.

== Career ==
Charonne's choreography career grew after working with choreographer and producer Anita Mann in the early 1990s. Charonne choreographed numerous television shows, films, videos, commercials and live events over the next fifteen years. Charonne worked with many Hollywood legends like Shari Lewis, Whoopi Goldberg, Quincy Jones, Jerry Lewis, Cindy Crawford, Harry Connick Jr., Johnny Gill and Mary J. Blige. In 1996, Charonne Mose and Anita Mann won the Emmy Award for Outstanding Choreography for the 1995 Miss America Pageant, winning above Travis Payne and LaVelle Smith, who choreographed Michael Jackson in the MTV Video Music Awards.

After a long rewarding career in dance and choreography and the birth of her daughter, Charonne decided to go back to school and study Interactive Design Media. She then went on to earn a Bachelor of Science Degree in Business graduating on the President's List and then earned a Masters in Competitive Business Intelligence from Georgetown University in Washington, D.C graduating Summa cum laude. Her design career includes leading UX Design and Art direction at Disney, 20th Century Fox, and Guitar Center, PenFed and Bloomberg. Today, Charonne works at Microsoft where she is the Principal Product Design and UX manager.

Charonne continues to dance and performs in Ballroom dance showcases in the Washington, D.C., and Virginia area.

== Partial filmography ==
As choreographer

=== Television ===
- Harry Connick Jr. Christmas Special (1994)
- 27th Annual Country Music Association Awards (1994)
- 1995 Miss America Pageant (1996)
- Muppets Tonight (1996)
- 77th Annual Miss America Pageant (1998)
- 25th Annual American Music Awards (1998)
- Quincy Jones -- The First 50 Years (1998) (as consultant)
- 34th Annual Academy of Country Music Awards (1999)

=== Film ===
- Sing (1989)

== Awards and honors ==
In 1995, Charonne Mose won an Emmy Award for Outstanding Choreography for the Miss America Pageant. She has also won an Addy Award from the American Advertising Association and a Webby Award for her work in interactive design.
