= Margaret Veronica Moses =

Australian teacher and orphanage administrator (1940 – 1975)

Personal life
- Born: 15 February 1940 Launceston, Tasmania, Australia
- Died: 4 April 1975 (aged 35)
- Parents: Harry Moses (father); Margaret Elizabeth (mother)
- Education: St Aloysius' College (Sydney), University of Adelaide
- Occupation: Catholic religious sister; Charity worker; Poet; School teacher

Religious life
- Religion: Christianity

Margaret Veronica Moses (15 February 1940 – 4 April 1975) also known as Sister of Mercy and her religious name Miriam was an Australian teacher, poet and orphanage administrator.

== Early life and background ==
Moses was born in 1940 to Margaret Elizabeth and Harry Moses, who were both schoolteachers at Launceston, Tasmania, Australia.

Moses received her education from the Sisters of Mercy at St Aloysius' College, Wakefield Street, during the years 1955–56. Following that, in 1957, she joined the Convent of Mercy located on Angas Street. On 16 January 1960, she professed and adopted the religious name Miriam. She pursued her studies in French and English at the University of Adelaide, earning her B.A. degree in 1963. Upon completing her education, she was assigned to Mater Christi College in Mount Gambier, where she demonstrated her teaching abilities. However, due to excessive workload, she made the difficult decision to leave the Order in 1968.

== Career ==
During the years 1968 to 1970, she held a position at Port Adelaide Girls' Technical High School, where she dedicated herself to empowering her students. Many of these young individuals came from underprivileged backgrounds, and she encouraged them to express their thoughts and emotions through the mediums of poetry and diaries. In 1970, she was honored with appointments to two subject committees of the Public Examination Board. These committees were responsible for developing an English syllabus that aimed to incorporate more contemporary and relatable material, rather than solely focusing on traditional literature. Driven by a strong belief in social justice, she viewed her role not only as an educator but also as a caregiver, providing pastoral support to her students. Unfortunately, this compassionate approach was not well received by the South Australian Education Department, leading to her disillusionment and eventual resignation.

In March 1971, Moses teamed up with her companion Rosemary Taylor, who was stationed in Saigon overseeing orphanages for an American organization called Friends of the Children of Vietnam. This organization was established with the aim of rescuing children who had been orphaned or abandoned during the Vietnam War and finding suitable families for them in Western nations.

== Death ==
On 4 April 1975, she agreed to take up an offer for 250 spots on an American Airforce Galaxy C-5A. In a sudden change of plans, Moses boarded the plane. Shortly after departure, the aircraft experienced a malfunction with its cargo door and made an emergency landing, resulting in the tragic loss of seventy-eight children and their seven escorts, including Moses and a nurse from South Australia.
