= Mose (scribe) =

Mose was an ancient Egyptian official with the title scribe of the treasury of Ptah. He lived under Ramesses II, around 1250 BC. He is mainly known from his decorated tomb chapel that was excavated by Victor Loret at Saqqara, close to the Pyramid of Teti. Most of the blocks from the tomb chapel were brought to the Egyptian Museum at Cairo. Mose quickly became famous within research after the discovery of the tomb, as the walls of his tomb chapel contained long texts reporting a legal battle over a land dispute. The battle went over several generations and is an important document for the history of law in Ancient Egypt. It is most interesting to see how women acted independently at the court.

The father of Mose was a man called Huy. He was also scribe of the treasury of Ptah. His wife and the mother of Mose was a woman called Nubnofret. Mose was married to a woman with the name Mutnofert. At least five children are known.

The tomb chapel consisted of a big open courtyard with several smaller chapels on the West side. The decoration in sunken relief shows mainly Mose in front of different deities. On the North wall Mose is shown at the law court. The long legal text also covers most parts of the North wall.

Under king Ahmose I, the treasurer Neshi received a piece of land from the king. The land remained over a long time in the hand of one part of the family. Under king Horemheb, Urnero, one female member of the family claimed that the land belongs to her. She won the case at the law court and a certain Khay who owned it before lost the land. His sister, Takharu went back to the law court and demanded that the land should be divided between several family members. It seems, that she won. Urnero and her son Huy went back to the law court and gained again full control over the land. Huy administered it until he died. His widow Nubnofert, wanted to go on, but Khay took over control. Nubnofert complained against this but lost at the court against Khay. This happened in year 18 under Ramesses II. After that, Mose, the son of Nubnofert got involved and tried to claim the land back. The result of his claims are not known as the end of the text is lost, but it seems certain that he won the court case.

== See also ==
- List of ancient Egyptian scribes
- Mose (Ancient Egyptian official)
