= Mose (Ancient Egyptian official) =

Ancient Egyptian official

Mose was an ancient Egyptian official who served in the court of 19th Dynasty Pharaoh Ramesses II during the 13th century BC.

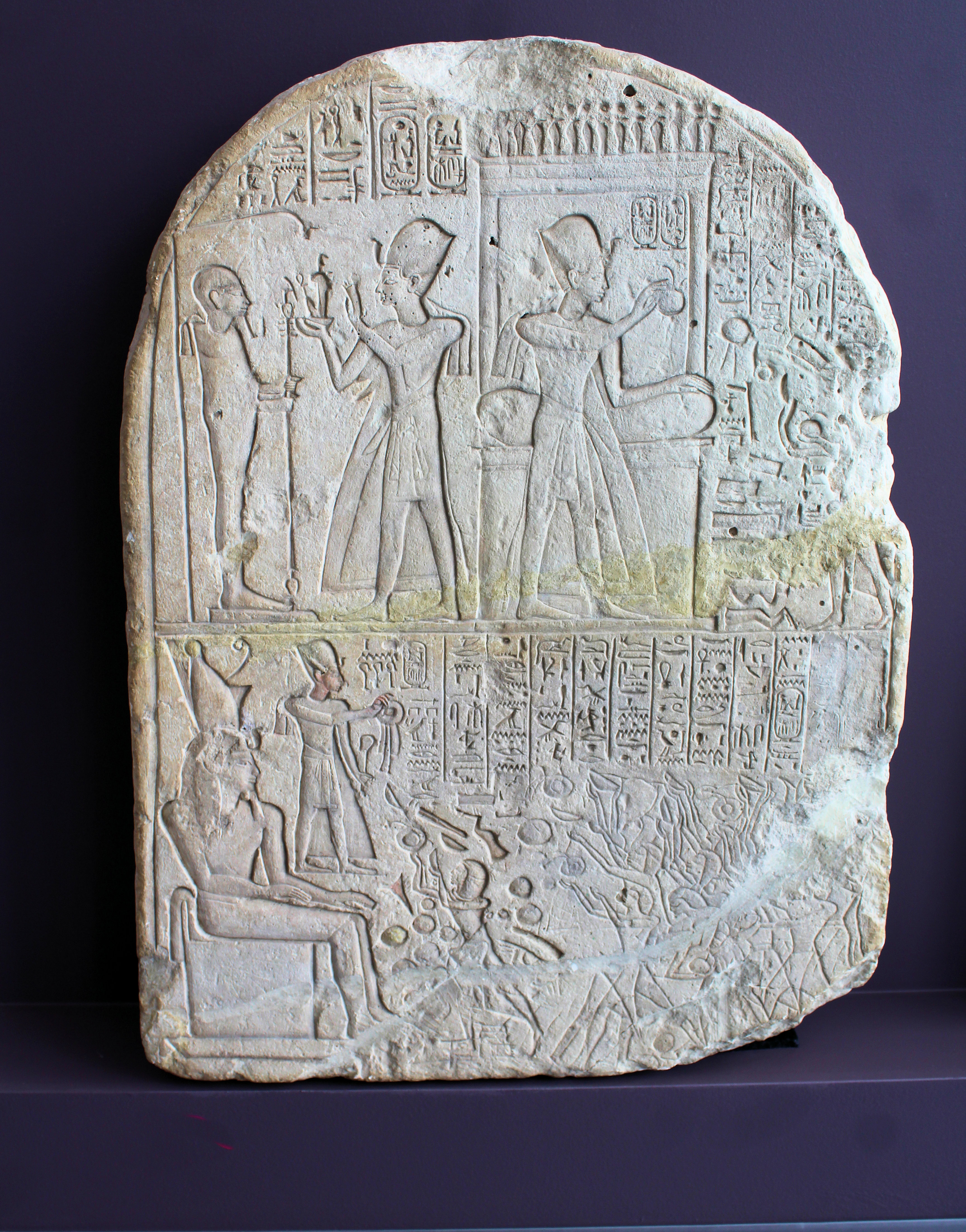
The Stele of Mose

Mose was a Soldier of Ramesses II, beloved of Atum and greatly favored by him. A stele was created for Mose, depicting him receiving gifts from his king. The stela is now in the Roemer- und Pelizaeus-Museum Hildesheim (nr 374) and originally comes from Qantir. The Stele demonstrate his high position: Mose is standing in front of the Pharaoh where the inscription says: "The King himself gives silver and all good things of the king's house, because the king is "pleased with the speech of his mouth". To the soldiers Ramesses says: "I wish you may see and do what His Majesty loves. How good is what he has done! Great, great!".

Mose's name was cited in amateur documentaries who looked to check the authenticity of the Exodus story, his name was usually brought up as supposedly being similar in definition and pronunciation to Moses' Hebrew name: Moshe. However, Egyptology treats Mose as a completely different historical figure, and the favour of the king was rendered unto many other individuals, such as Anhurmose.

== See also ==
- Mose (scribe)
