= Crew Return Vehicle =

Proposed dedicated lifeboat or escape module for the International Space Station

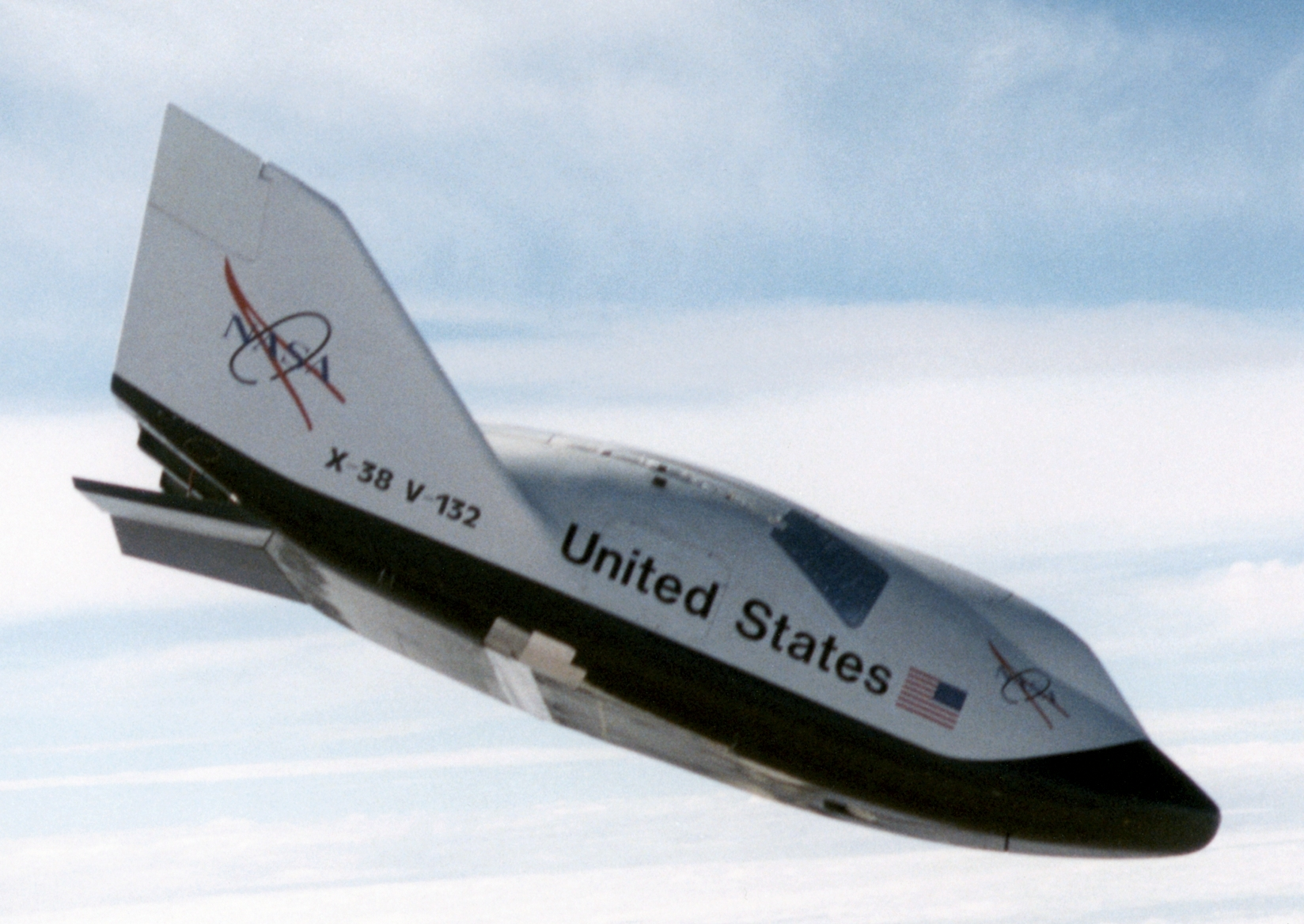
ISS Crew Return Vehicle – CRV (X-38 Prototype)

The Crew Return Vehicle (CRV), sometimes referred to as the Assured Crew Return Vehicle (ACRV), was a proposed dedicated lifeboat or escape module for the International Space Station (ISS). A number of different vehicles and designs were considered over two decades – with several flying as developmental test prototypes – but none became operational. Since the arrival of the first permanent crew to the ISS in 2000, the emergency return capability has been fulfilled by Soyuz spacecraft and, more recently, SpaceX's Crew Dragon – each rotated every 6 months.

In the original space station design, emergencies were intended to be dealt with by having a "safe area" on the station that the crew could evacuate to, pending a rescue from a U.S. Space Shuttle. However, the 1986 Space Shuttle Challenger disaster and the subsequent grounding of the shuttle fleet caused station planners to rethink this concept. Planners foresaw the need for a CRV to address three specific scenarios:

- Crew return in case of unavailability of a Space Shuttle or Soyuz capsule;
- Prompt escape from a major time-critical space station emergency;
- Full or partial crew return in case of a medical emergency.

== Medical considerations ==
The ISS is equipped with a Health Maintenance Facility (HMF) to handle a certain level of medical situations, which are broken into three main classifications:

- Class I: non-life-threatening illnesses and injuries (headache, lacerations).
- Class II: moderate to severe, possibly life-threatening (appendicitis, kidney stones).
- Class III: severe, incapacitating, life-threatening (major trauma, toxic exposure).

However, the HMF is not designed to have general surgical capability, so a means of evacuating a crew member in case of a medical situation that is beyond the HMF's capabilities is essential.

A number of studies have attempted to assess the medical risks for long-term space station habitation, but the results are inconclusive, as epidemiological data is lacking. It is, however, understood that longer periods in space increase the risk of serious problems. The closest estimates show an illness/injury rate of 1:3 per year, with 1% estimated to require emergency evacuation by means of a CRV. For an eight-person ISS crew, this results in an expected need for a CRV flight once every 4 to 12 years. These estimates have been partially corroborated by experiences on board the Soviet Union's Mir space station. In the 1980s, the Soviets had at least three incidents where cosmonauts had to be returned under urgent medical conditions.

Because of its potential use as a medical evacuation method, the CRV design was required to address a number of issues that are not factors for a standard crewed space vehicle. Foremost of these are the g-loadings as influenced by reentry profiles and deceleration/landing methods upon patients with hemorrhagic shock issues. Patient security issues are more critical for injured astronauts than for uninjured personnel. Additionally, depending on the nature of the injury, it may be unlikely that the patient could be placed in an environmentally contained space suit or minicapsule, therefore the CRV needs to have the capability to provide a "shirt sleeve" environment. The ability to address air purity issues is included in this requirement, as air purity is especially critical in medical as well as toxic exposure situations.

== Early NASA concepts ==
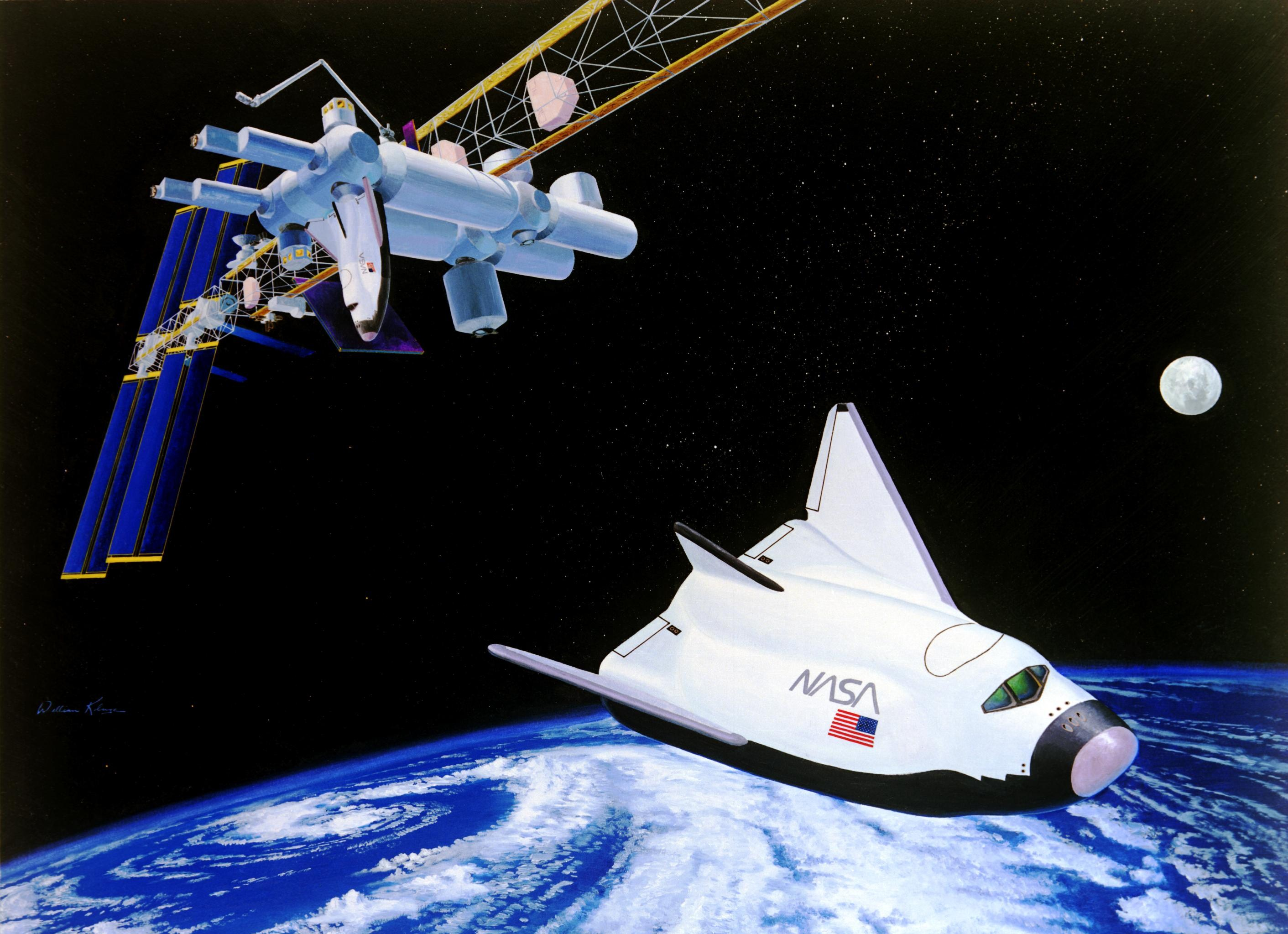
HL-20 Concept art

Dr. Wernher von Braun first brought up the concept of space lifeboats in a 1966 article, and then later NASA planners developed a number of early concepts for a space station lifeboat:

=== Capsule systems ===
- The Station Crew Return Alternative Module (SCRAM) was a capsule which could hold up to six astronauts. Reentry heat protection was provided by the use of a heat shield designed for the NASA Viking Mars probe. Costing US$600 million, the primary drawback to this design was high g-loadings on landing, which were not ideal in the case of a medically necessitated evacuation.
- As a follow-on to the Viking-based concept, NASA considered a 1986 proposal by General Electric and NIS Space Ltd. for a commercially developed derivative of the U.S. Air Force blunt body Discoverer-type recovery capsule called MOSES, already designed for classified military projects, and initially were planned for up to four occupants, but the idea of scaling the capsule up to accommodate eight crew members was considered for a time before also being dropped. However, g-loads of up to 8-g's make this vehicle unsuitable for critical medical situations.
- In 1989, NASA engineers patented a capsule-type ACRV concept.

=== HL-20 PLS ===
The HL-20 Crew Rescue Vehicle was based on the Personnel Launch System (PLS) concept being developed by NASA as an outgrowth of earlier lifting body research. In October 1989, Rockwell International (Space Systems Division) began a year-long contracted effort managed by Langley Research Center to perform an in-depth study of PLS design and operations with the HL-20 concept as a baseline for the study. In October 1991, the Lockheed Advanced Development Company (better known as the Skunk Works) began a study to determine the feasibility of developing a prototype and operational system. A cooperative agreement between NASA, North Carolina State University and North Carolina A&T University led to the construction of a full-scale model of the HL-20 PLS for further human factors research on this concept. Of all the options, a lifting body presents the most ideal medical environment in terms of controlled environment as well as low g-loading during reentry and landing. However, the price tag for the HL-20 project was US$2 billion, and Congress cut the program from NASA's budget in 1990.

== European Space Agency concepts ==
As a part of their wide-ranging studies of potential human spaceflight programs, the European Space Agency (ESA) began a six-month, first-phase ACRV study in October 1992. Prime contractors for the study were Aérospatiale, Alenia Spazio and Deutsche Aerospace.

The ESA studied several concepts for a CRV:

- Apollo-type capsule: This would have been a scaled-up version of the 1960s Apollo capsule capable of carrying eight astronauts. A tower that sat on top of the capsule would contain a docking tunnel as well as the capsule's rocket engines, again similar to the Apollo configuration. The tower would be jettisoned just before reentry. Landing would be via deceleration parachutes and air bags.
- Also during Phase 1 studies, the ESA looked at a conical capsule known as the "Viking". Like the Apollo-style concept, it would have reentered base-first, but it had a more aerodynamic shape. The rocket engines for the "Viking" module were derivatives of the Ariane Transfer Vehicle. The design work continued until the end of Phase 1 in March 1995.
- A Blunt Biconic concept was studied in 1993–1994. This design was expected to be more maneuverable, but would have been heavier and more expensive.

The ESA's US$1.7 billion ACRV program was cancelled in 1995, although French protests resulted in a two-year contract to perform further studies, which led to a scaled-down Atmospheric Reentry Demonstrator capsule, which was flown in 1997. The ESA instead elected to join NASA's X-38 CRV program in May 1996, after that program finished its Phase A study.

== Lifeboat Alpha ==
The idea of using a Russian-built craft as a CRV dates back to March 1993, when President Bill Clinton directed NASA to redesign Space Station Freedom and consider including Russian elements. The design was revised that summer, resulting in Space Station Alpha (later the International Space Station). One of the Russian elements considered as a part of the redesign was the use of Soyuz "lifeboats." It was estimated that using the Soyuz capsules for CRV purposes would save NASA US$500 million over the cost expected for Freedom.

However, in 1995, a joint venture between Energia, Rockwell International and Khrunichev proposed the Lifeboat Alpha design, derived from the Zarya reentry vehicle. The reentry motor was a solid propellant, and maneuvering thrusters utilized cold gas, so that it would have had a five-year on-station life cycle. The design was rejected, though, in June 1996 in favor of the NASA CRV/X-38 program.

== X-38 ==
Besides referring to a generalized role within the ISS program, the name Crew Return Vehicle also refers to a specific design program initiated by NASA and joined by the ESA. The concept was to produce a spaceplane that was dedicated to the CRV role only. As such, it was to have three specific missions: medical return, crew return in case of the ISS becoming uninhabitable, and crew return if the ISS cannot be resupplied.

=== CRV overview and concept development ===
As a follow-on to the HL-20 program, the NASA intent was to apply Administrator Dan Goldin's concept of "better, faster, cheaper" to the program. The CRV design concept incorporated three main elements: the lifting-body reentry vehicle, the international berthing/docking module, and the Deorbit Propulsion Stage. The vehicle was to be designed to accommodate up to seven crew members in a shirt-sleeve environment. Because of the need to be able to operate with incapacitated crew members, flight and landing operations were to be performed autonomously. The CRV design had no space maneuvering propulsion system.

NASA and ESA agreed that the CRV would be designed to be launched on top of an expendable launch vehicle (ELV) such as the Ariane 5. The program envisioned the construction of four CRV vehicles and two berthing/docking modules. The vehicles and berthing-docking modules were to be delivered to the ISS by the Space Shuttle, and each would remain docked for three years.

Depending on which mission was being operated, maximum mission duration was intended to be up to nine hours. If the mission was related to emergency medical return, the mission duration could be reduced to three hours, given optimum sequencing between ISS departure and the deorbit/reentry burn. Under normal operations, the undocking process would take up to 30 minutes, but in an emergency the CRV could separate from the ISS in as little as three minutes.

The CRV was to have a length of 29.8 ft (9.1 m) and a cabin volume of 416.4 ft^{3} (11.8 m^{3}). Maximum landing weight was to be 22,046 lb (10,000 kg). The autonomous landing system was intended to place the vehicle on the ground within 3,000 ft (0.9 km) of its intended target.

The Deorbit Propulsion Stage was designed by Aerojet GenCorp under contract to the Marshall Space Flight Center. The module was to be attached to the aft of the spacecraft at six points, and is 15.5 ft (4.72 m) long and 6 ft (1.83 m) wide. Fully fueled, the module would weigh about 6,000 lb (2721.5 kg). The module was designed with eight 100 lbf (0.44 kN)-thrust rocket engines fueled by hydrazine, which would burn for ten minutes to deorbit the CRV. Eight reaction control thrusters would then control the ship's attitude during deorbit. Once the burn was completed, the module was to be jettisoned, and would burn most of its mass up as it reentered the atmosphere.

The cabin of the CRV was designed to be a "windowless cockpit", as windows and windshields add considerable weight to the design and pose additional flight risks to the spacecraft. Instead, the CRV was to have a "virtual cockpit window" system that used synthetic vision tools to provide an all-weather, day or night, real-time, 3-D visual display to the occupants.

=== X-38 Advanced Technology Demonstrator ===
In order to develop the design and technologies for the operational CRV at a fraction of the cost of other space vehicles, NASA launched a program to develop a series of low-cost, rapid-prototype vehicles that were designated the X-38 Advanced Technology Demonstrators. As described in EAS Bulletin 101, the X-38 program "is a multiple application technology demonstration and risk mitigation programme, finding its first application as the pathfinder for the operational Crew Return Vehicle (CRV) for the International Space Station (ISS)."

NASA acted as its own prime contractor for the X-38 program, with the Johnson Space Center taking the project lead. All aspects of construction and development were managed in-house, although specific tasks were contracted out. For the production CRV, NASA intended to select an outside prime contractor to build the craft.

Four test vehicles were planned, but only two were built, both atmospheric test vehicles. The airframes, which were largely built of composite materials, were constructed under contract by Scaled Composites. The first flew its maiden flight on March 12, 1998. The X-38 utilized a unique parafoil landing system designed by Pioneer Aerospace. The ram-air inflated parafoil used in the flight test program was the largest in the world, with a surface area of 7,500 sq ft (700 m^{2}). The parafoil was actively controlled by an onboard guidance system that was based on GPS navigation.

=== Controversy ===
NASA's plans for the development program did not include an operational test of the actual CRV, which would have involved it being launched to the ISS, remaining docked there for up to three months, and then conducting an "empty" return to Earth. Instead, NASA had planned to "human rate" the spacecraft based on the results of the X-38's orbital testing. Three independent review groups, as well as the NASA Office of Inspector General, expressed concerns about the wisdom and safety of this plan.

The rapid-prototyping method of development, as opposed to the approach of sequential design, development, test and engineering evaluation also raised some concerns about program risk.

=== Funding issues ===
In 1999, NASA projected the cost of the X-38 program at US$96 million (Space Flight Advanced Projects funds) and the actual CRV program at US$1.1 billion (ISS Program funds). A year later, the X-38 costs had risen to US$124.3 million, with the increased cost being paid for by ISS funds. Part of the increased cost was the result of the need to operationally test the CRV with at least one, and possibly more, shuttle launches.

The ESA chose not to fund the CRV program directly, but instead decided to allow ESA-participating governments to fund the program individually, starting in 1999. Belgium, France, Germany, The Netherlands, Italy, Spain, Sweden, and Switzerland all indicated that they would make substantial contributions.

U.S. funding for the NASA/ESA CRV was never a settled issue. In the Fiscal Year (FY) 2002 funding bill, Congress recommended a funding amount of US$275 million, but made it clear that this was conditional:

[T]he Committee does not anticipate providing additional funds for this purpose unless it is made clear that the Administration and the international partners are committed to the International Space Station as a research facility. For this reason, the language included in the bill would rescind the $275,000,000 unless the Administration requests at least $200,000,000 for the crew return vehicle in the fiscal year 2003 NASA budget request.

Furthermore, funding of the CRV program was tied to Administration justification of the mission of the ISS:

By March 1, 2002, the President shall submit to the Committees on Appropriations of the House and Senate a comprehensive plan that meets the following terms and conditions: First, a clear and unambiguous statement on the role of research in the International Space Station program. Second, a detailed outline of the efforts being pursued to provide habitation facilities for a full-time crew of no less than six persons.... Third, the anticipated costs of the crew return vehicle program by fiscal year.... Fourth, the relative priority of the crew return vehicle development program in the context of the International Space Station. The Committee does not intend to provide any additional funds or approve the release of any of the $275,000,000 provided in this bill, until all conditions are fully satisfied.

=== Cancellation ===
On April 29, 2002, NASA announced that it was cancelling the CRV and X-38 programs, due to budget pressures associated with other elements of the ISS. The agency had been faced with a US$4 billion shortfall, and so radically redesigned the scope of the ISS, calling the new version U.S. Core Complete. This scaled-down station did not include the X-38-based CRV. Although the FY 2002 House budget had proposed US$275 million for the CRV, this was not included in the final budget bill. House–Senate conferees, however, saw the need to keep the CRV options open, believing that NASA's redesign and consequent deletion of the CRV premature, and so directed NASA to spend up to US$40 million to keep the X-38 program alive.

The CRV cancellation created its own controversy, with Congressman Ralph Hall (D-TX) taking NASA to task in an open letter detailing three areas of criticism:

- switching resources to a multipurpose Crew Transfer Vehicle might be more costly and time-consuming than completing the CRV project;
- relying on Soyuz spacecraft for American astronauts beyond the contracted time frame might be subject to political restrictions;
- questioning whether an independent cost-benefit analysis was conducted prior to NASA's decision.

NASA administrator Sean O'Keefe's responses did not satisfy Mr. Hall but the decision stood.

== Orbital Space Plane ==
As a part of NASA's Integrated Space Transportation Plan (ISTP) which restructured the Space Launch Initiative (SLI), focus moved in 2002 to developing the Orbital Space Plane (OSP) (early on referred to as the Crew Transfer Vehicle, or CTV), which would serve as both crew transport and as the CRV. In the restructuring, program priorities were changed, as NASA declared: "NASA's needs for transporting US crew to and from the Space Station is a driving space transportation requirement and must be addressed as an agency priority. It is NASA's responsibility to ensure that a capability for emergency return of the ISS crew is available. The design and development of an evolvable and flexible vehicle architecture that will initially provide crew return capability and then evolve into a crew transport vehicle is now the near-term focus of SLI."

A Crew Transfer Vehicle/Crew Rescue Vehicle Study, conducted by the SLI program in 2002, concluded that a multi-purpose Orbital Space Plane that can perform both the crew transfer and crew return functions for the Space Station is viable and could provide the greatest long-term benefit for NASA's investment. One of the key missions for the OSP, as defined by NASA in 2002, was to provide "rescue capability for no fewer than four Space Station crew members as soon as practical, but no later than 2010." As a part of the flight evaluation program that was to explore and validate technologies to be used in the OSP, NASA initiated the X-37 program, selecting Boeing Integrated Defense Systems as the prime contractor.

However, the OSP received heavy congressional criticism for being too limited in mission ("...the primary shortcoming of the OSP is that, as currently envisioned, it leads nowhere besides the space station") and for costing as much as US$3 to $5 billion.

Then, in 2004, NASA's focus changed yet again, from the OSP to the Crew Exploration Vehicle (CEV), and the X-37 project was transferred to DARPA, where some aspects of technology development were continued, but only as an atmospheric test vehicle.

== Apollo-derivative capsule ==
With the cancellation of the OSP, the Apollo capsule was once again looked at for use as a CRV, this time by NASA in March 2003. In the initial study of the concept, "the Team concluded unanimously that an Apollo-derived Crew Return Vehicle (CRV) concept, with a 4 to 6 person crew, appears to have the potential of meeting most of the OSP CRV Level 1 requirements. An Apollo derived Crew Transport Vehicle (CTV) would also appear to be able to meet most of the OSP CTV Level 1 requirements with the addition of a service module. The team also surmised that there would be an option to consider the Apollo CSM concept for a common CRV/CTV system. It was further concluded that using the Apollo Command Module (CM) and Service Module (SM) as an ISS CRV and CTV has sufficient merit to warrant a serious detailed study of the performance, cost, and schedule for this approach, in comparison with other OSP approaches, to the same Level 1 requirements."

The study identified a number of issues with development of this option: "On the one hand, the Apollo system is well understood, and proved to be a highly successful, rugged system with a very capable launch abort system. Documentation would be very helpful in leading the designers. On the other hand, nearly every system would have to be redesigned, even if it were to be replicated. None of the existing hardware (such as CMs in Museums) was thought to be usable, because of age, obsolescence, lack of traceability, and water immersion. There would be no need for fuel cells or cryogenics, and modern guidance and communications would be lighter and less expensive. Although the flight hardware would be less expensive, and its impact on the Expendable Launch Vehicles would be minimal (it's just another axisymmetrical payload), the landing sites for the CRV may drive the Life Cycle costs high. By adding a Service Module (smaller than the one required to go to the Moon), orbital cross-range of 3000 to 5,000 ft/s (1,500 m/s), might be gained, and the number of landing sites radically reduced. If land landings can be added to the system safely, another major reduction in life cycle costs would result, because the team believed that the system could be made re-usable."

Due to the capsule's aerodynamic characteristics, g-loadings are in the moderate range, (2.5 to 3.5g). From a medical perspective, though, the Apollo-type capsule presents several disadvantages. The Apollo capsule would have an internal atmospheric operating pressure of only 5 PSI, as opposed to the station's 14.5 PSI. In addition, a water landing on short notice presents some significant delays in capsule recovery.

== Soyuz ==
With the cancellation of the X-38 and CRV programs in 2001, it was clear that the interim use of Soyuz capsules would be a longer term necessity. To make them more compatible with the needs of the ISS, Energia was contracted to modify the standard Soyuz TM capsule to the TMA configuration. The main modifications involve the interior layout, with new, improved seats to accommodate larger American astronaut anthropometric standards. A series of test drops of the improved capsule were made in 1998 and 1999 from an Ilyushin Il-76 cargo plane to validate the landing capabilities of the TMA.

A Soyuz-TMA capsule was always attached to the ISS in "standby" mode, in case of emergencies. Operated in this configuration, the TMA had a lifespan of about 200 days before it has to be rotated out, due to the degradation of the hydrogen peroxide used for its reaction control system. Because of this limitation, the vehicle is planned for a typical six-month changeout cycle. The first flight of the TMA to the ISS occurred on October 29, 2002 with the flight of the Soyuz TMA-1.

Because the TMA was limited to three occupants, the ISS was also likewise restricted to that number of occupants, which drastically reduces the amount of research that can be done on board the ISS to 20 person-hours per week, far lower than what was anticipated when the station was designed. With Expedition 20 in May 2009, the crew size of the ISS was increased from 3 to 6 persons with the simultaneously docked two Soyuz spacecraft.

The Soyuz TMA was succeeded by the Soyuz TMA-M over 2010–2012, and subsequently by the Soyuz MS in 2016.

== Commercial Crew Development ==
In 2008, NASA began administering a program (CCDev) to fund development of commercial crew transportation technologies. The program funded bids to develop specific technologies with awards when milestones were achieved. The first round of recipients in early 2010 included Boeing for its CST-100 capsule and Sierra Nevada Corporation for its Dream Chaser spaceplane. Further proposals submitted at the end of 2010 for a second round of funding included Orbital Sciences Corporation for its Prometheus spaceplane and SpaceX for developing a launch abort system for its Dragon spacecraft.
