= 2019 Cincinnati Bengals season =

52nd season in franchise history

- Owner: Mike Brown
- Head coach: Zac Taylor
- Home stadium: Paul Brown Stadium

Results
- Record: 2–14
- Division place: 4th AFC North
- Playoffs: Did not qualify
- All-Pros: None
- Pro Bowlers: DT Geno Atkins

Uniform
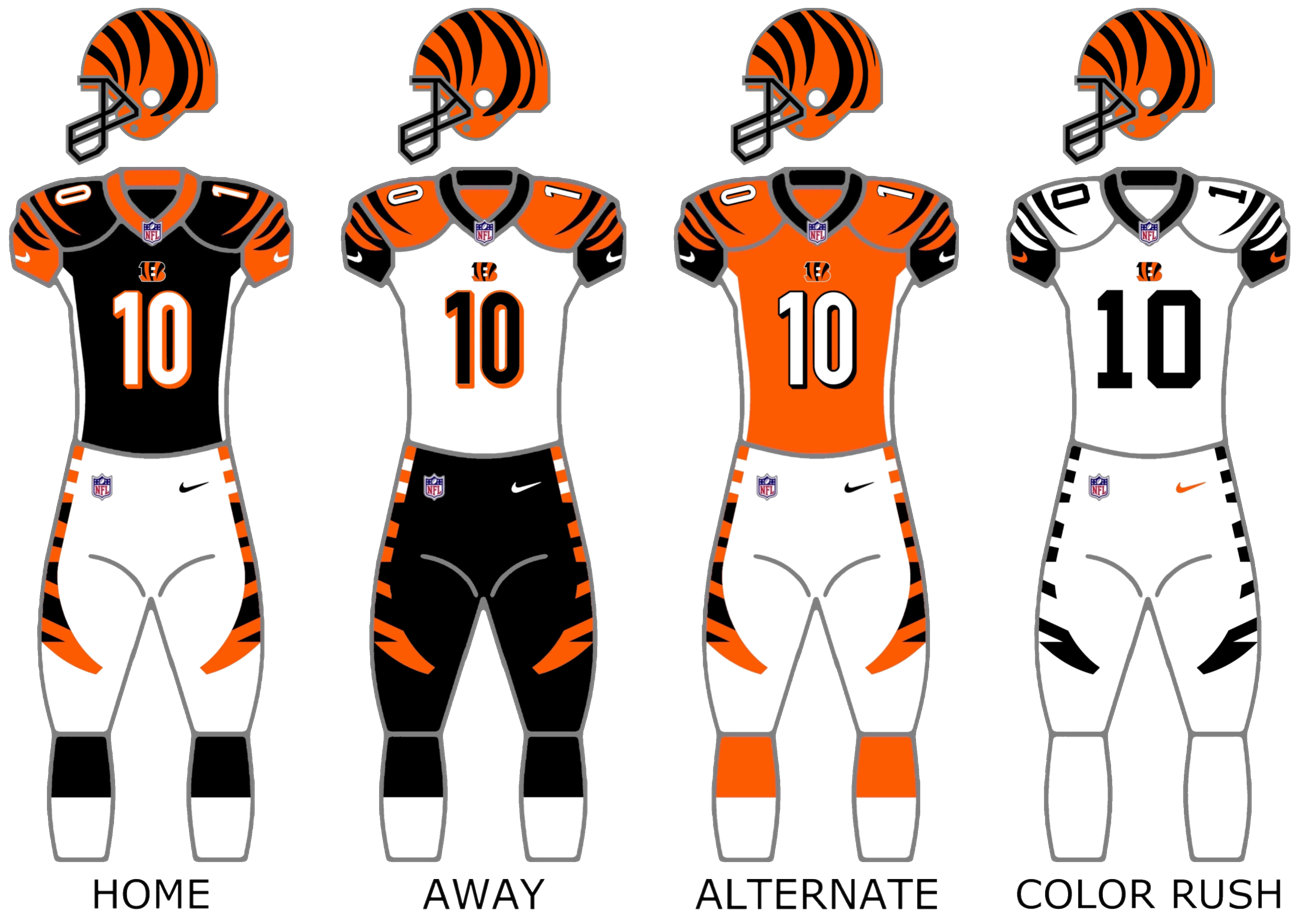

The 2019 season was the Cincinnati Bengals' 50th in the National Football League (NFL), their 52nd overall, their 20th playing home games at Paul Brown Stadium and the first under head coach Zac Taylor. This was the Bengals' first season since 2002 without long-time head coach Marvin Lewis, as he mutually agreed to part ways after the conclusion of the 2018 season.

Not only did the Bengals not improve upon last season's record of 6–10, but they also suffered an 0–11 start to the season for the first time in franchise history. As a result, they became the first team to be eliminated from playoff contention when they lost to the Oakland Raiders in Week 11, extending their playoff drought to four seasons. This marked the Bengals' fourth consecutive losing season. They finished the season 2–14, tying their franchise-worst record from 2002.

The Bengals won their first game in Week 13, when they defeated the New York Jets, 22–6.

With a Week 16 loss to the Miami Dolphins, the Bengals secured the first overall pick in the 2020 NFL draft, which was then used to select QB Joe Burrow. It was the first time they had the first overall pick since 2003, when they drafted QB Carson Palmer. This would end up being quarterback Andy Dalton's final season with the Bengals, as he was released shortly after the team drafted Burrow.

== Offseason ==
=== Coaching changes ===
- February 4, 2019: Named Zac Taylor head coach, the tenth head coach in Bengals history. Taylor was previously the Los Angeles Rams quarterbacks coach.
- February 7, 2019: Announced the hiring of four offensive assistants: Brian Callahan as offensive coordinator, Jim Turner will be the offensive line coach, James Casey as tight ends coach, Ben Martin as assistant offensive line coach.
- February 11, 2019: Announced the hiring of three assistant coaches: Jemal Singleton as running backs coach, Joey Boese as strength and conditioning coach, and Doug Rosfeld as director of coaching operations. Rosfeld was previously the head football coach at Cincinnati's Archbishop Moeller High School in 2018.
- February 21, 2019: Announced the hiring of Lou Anarumo as defensive coordinator. Anarumo was previously the defensive backs coach for the New York Giants. Prior to joining the Giants, he was the defensive backs coach for the Miami Dolphins from 2012 to 2017.
- February 28, 2019: Announced the hiring of six assistant coaches: Nick Eason as defensive line coach, Tem Lukabu as linebackers coach, Brad Kragthorpe as an offensive assistant, Jordan Kovacs as defensive quality control coach, and Todd Hunt and Garrett Swanson as assistant strength and conditioning coaches.
- March 7, 2019: Announced the hiring of two assistant coaches, Mark Duffner as senior defensive assistant, and Gerald Chatman as a defensive assistant.

=== Free agents ===
==== Unrestricted ====
Position	Player	2019 Team	Date signed	Contract
OLB	Preston Brown	Cincinnati Bengals	March 13	3 years, $16.5 million
CB	Darqueze Dennard	Cincinnati Bengals	March 25	1 year, $4.5 million
DE	Kasim Edebali			
TE	Tyler Eifert	Cincinnati Bengals	March 16	1 year, $4 million
TE	Jake Fisher	Buffalo Bills	March 22	1 year, $805,000
OT	Bobby Hart	Cincinnati Bengals	March 12	3 years, $16.15 million
DE	Michael Johnson	Retirement		
TE	Tyler Kroft	Buffalo Bills	March 11	3 years, $18.75 million
OT	Cedric Ogbuehi	Jacksonville Jaguars	March 16	1 year, $895,000
OLB	Vincent Rey			
QB	Tom Savage	Detroit Lions	April 9	1 year, $895,000
OT	Andre Smith	Cincinnati Bengals	July 25	1 year, $1.03 million
TE	C. J. Uzomah	Cincinnati Bengals	March 14	3 years, $18.3 million

==== Restricted and Exclusive-Rights ====
Position	Player	Tag	2019 Team	Date signed	Contract
G	Trey Hopkins	ERFA	Cincinnati Bengals	April 4	1 year, $3.095M
TE	Matt Lengel	RFA			
CB	Tony McRae	ERFA	Cincinnati Bengals	April 9	1 year, $645,000
G	Alex Redmond	ERFA	Cincinnati Bengals	April 10	1 year, $645,000
DT	Josh Tupou	ERFA	Cincinnati Bengals	March 21	1 year, $645,000
DT	Adolphus Washington	RFA	Miami Dolphins	May 23	1 year, $720,000
S	Brandon Wilson	ERFA	Cincinnati Bengals	March 11	1 year, $645,000

=== Signings ===
Position	Player	2018 team	Date signed	Contract
G	John Miller	Buffalo Bills	March 15	3 years, $16.5 million
CB	B. W. Webb	New York Giants	March 14	3 years, $10.5 million
DE	Kerry Wynn	New York Giants	March 27	1 year, $1.4 million
T	Justin Evans	Arizona Cardinals	May 22	1 year, $495K
G	John Jerry	New York Giants	June 10	1 year, $930K

=== Departures ===
Position	Player	2019 team	Contract
LB	Vontaze Burfict	Oakland Raiders	1 year, $2 million
RB	Mark Walton	Miami Dolphins	1 year, $495,000
LB	Brandon Bell		
G	Rod Taylor		
G	Clint Boling	Retirement	
WR	Kermit Whitfield		

== Draft ==
2019 Cincinnati Bengals draft
Round	Pick	Player	Position	College	Notes
1	11	Jonah Williams	Tackle	Alabama	
2	52	Drew Sample	Tight end	Washington	From Denver
3	72	Germaine Pratt	Linebacker	NC State	
4	104	Ryan Finley	Quarterback	NC State	From San Francisco
4	125	Renell Wren	Defensive tackle	Arizona State	From Denver
4	136	Michael Jordan	Center	Ohio State	From Dallas
6	182	Trayveon Williams	Running back	Texas A&M	From Denver
6*	210	Deshaun Davis	Linebacker	Auburn	Compensatory selection
6*	211	Rodney Anderson	Running back	Oklahoma	Compensatory selection
7	223	Jordan Brown	Corner back	South Dakota State	
Made roster † Pro Football Hall of Fame * Made at least one Pro Bowl during career

Notes

- The Bengals were awarded three compensatory picks (210th, 211th and 213th overall) by the NFL.
- The Bengals received a sixth-round draft pick (198th overall) from the Dallas Cowboys in exchange for cornerback Bene Benwikere.
- The Bengals received the Denver Broncos second-, fourth- and sixth-round selections (52nd, 125th and 182nd overall) in exchange for the Bengals' second-round selection (42nd overall).
- The Bengals received the San Francisco 49ers fourth-round selection (104th overall) in exchange for two of the Bengals sixth-round selections (183rd and 198th overall).
- The Bengals received the Dallas Cowboys fourth-round selection (136th overall) in exchange for the Bengals fifth- and sixth-round selections (149th and 213th overall).

=== Undrafted free agents ===
Player	Position	College	Signed
Jake Dolegala	QB	Central Connecticut	May 10
O'Shea Dugas	OL	Penn State	May 10
Charles Holland	WR	Tiffin	May 10
Curtis Akins	OLB	Penn State	May 10
Jordan Ellis	RB	Virginia	May 10
Tyree Kinnel	DB	Michigan	May 10
Stanley Morgan Jr.	WR	Nebraska	May 10
Keaton Sutherland	OL	Texas A&M	May 10
Anthony Chesley	DB	Coastal Carolina	May 10
Damion Willis	WR	Troy	May 10
Sterling Sheffield	LB	Maine	May 11
Ventell Bryant	WR	Temple	May 11
Noah Dawkins	LB	The Citadel	May 11

Made regular season roster

== Staff ==
2019 Cincinnati Bengals staff
Front office: President/general manager – Mike Brown; Executive vice president – Katie Blackburn; Vice president – Troy Blackburn; Vice president of player personnel – Paul H. Brown; Director of player personnel – Duke Tobin; Personnel executive – Bill Tobin; Scouting director (College) – Mike Potts; Scouting director (Pro) – Steven Radicivec; Head coaches: Head coach – Zac Taylor; Offensive coaches: Offensive coordinator – Brian Callahan; Quarterbacks – Alex Van Pelt; Assistant quarterbacks – Dan Pitcher; Running backs – Jemal Singleton; Wide receivers – Bob Bicknell; Tight ends – James Casey; Offensive line – Jim Turner; Assistant offensive line – Ben Martin; Offensive assistant – Brad Kragthorpe	Defensive coaches: Defensive coordinator – Lou Anarumo; Defensive line – Nick Eason; Linebackers – Tem Lukabu; Secondary/cornerbacks – Daronte Jones; Secondary/safeties – Robert Livingston; Senior defensive assistant – Mark Duffner; Defensive assistant – Gerald Chatman; Defensive quality control – Jordan Kovacs; Special teams coaches: Special teams coordinator – Darrin Simmons; Assistant special teams – Brayden Coombs; Strength and conditioning: Strength and conditioning – Joey Boese; Assistant strength and conditioning – Todd Hunt; Assistant strength and conditioning – Garrett Swanson

== Final roster ==
2019 Cincinnati Bengals roster
Quarterbacks (QB): 14 Andy Dalton; 7 Jake Dolegala; 5 Ryan Finley; Running backs (RB): 25 Giovani Bernard; 28 Joe Mixon; 32 Trayveon Williams; Wide receivers (WR): 83 Tyler Boyd; 12 Alex Erickson; 16 Trenton Irwin; 17 Stanley Morgan Jr.; 11 John Ross; 15 Damion Willis; Tight ends (TE): 82 Cethan Carter; 85 Tyler Eifert; 88 Jordan Franks; 86 Mason Schreck; 87 C. J. Uzomah	Offensive linemen (OL): 77 Cordy Glenn T; 68 Bobby Hart T; 66 Trey Hopkins C; 64 John Jerry G/T; 74 Fred Johnson T; 60 Michael Jordan G; 67 John Miller G; 53 Billy Price G/C; 71 Isaiah Prince T; Defensive linemen (DL): 92 Freedom Akinmoladun DE; 97 Geno Atkins DT; 99 Andrew Billings DT; 93 Andrew Brown DE; 96 Carlos Dunlap DE; 94 Sam Hubbard DE; 58 Carl Lawson DE; 91 Josh Tupou DT	Linebackers (LB): 50 Jordan Evans OLB; 56 Hardy Nickerson Jr. MLB; 57 Germaine Pratt OLB; 55 LaRoy Reynolds MLB; 45 Brady Sheldon OLB; 59 Nick Vigil OLB; Defensive backs (DB): 30 Jessie Bates FS; 21 Darqueze Dennard CB; 42 Clayton Fejedelem FS; 41 Trayvon Henderson SS; 26 Greg Mabin CB; 29 Tony McRae CB; 20 Torry McTyer CB; 24 Darius Phillips CB; 23 B. W. Webb CB; 36 Shawn Williams SS; Special teams (ST): 4 Randy Bullock K; 46 Clark Harris LS; 10 Kevin Huber P	Practice squad: 75 Davin Bellamy DE; 49 Moritz Böhringer TE ^{Int'l}; 81 DaMarkus Lodge WR; 80 Cody Thompson WR; 3 Kaare Vedvik K; Reserve: 33 Rodney Anderson RB (IR); 70 O'Shea Dugas T (IR); 98 Ryan Glasgow DT (IR); 18 A. J. Green WR (IR); 22 William Jackson CB (IR); 27 Dre Kirkpatrick CB (IR); 62 Alex Redmond G (IR); 89 Drew Sample TE (IR); 69 Niles Scott DT (IR); 19 Auden Tate WR (IR); 73 Jonah Williams T (PUP); 40 Brandon Wilson SS (IR); 95 Renell Wren DT (IR); 72 Kerry Wynn DE (IR); Rookies in italics 53 active, 14 reserve, 5 practice squad

== Preseason ==
Week	Date	Opponent	Result	Record	Venue	Recap
1	August 10	at Kansas City Chiefs	L 17–38	0–1	Arrowhead Stadium	Recap
2	August 15	at Washington Redskins	W 23–13	1–1	FedExField	Recap
3	August 22	New York Giants	L 23–25	1–2	Paul Brown Stadium	Recap
4	August 29	Indianapolis Colts	L 6–13	1–3	Paul Brown Stadium	Recap

== Regular season ==
=== Schedule ===
Week	Date	Opponent	Result	Record	Venue	Recap
1	September 8	at Seattle Seahawks	**L** 20–21	0–1	CenturyLink Field	Recap
2	September 15	San Francisco 49ers	**L** 17–41	0–2	Paul Brown Stadium	Recap
3	September 22	at Buffalo Bills	**L** 17–21	0–3	New Era Field	Recap
4	September 30	at **Pittsburgh Steelers**	**L** 3–27	0–4	Heinz Field	Recap
5	October 6	Arizona Cardinals	**L** 23–26	0–5	Paul Brown Stadium	Recap
6	October 13	at **Baltimore Ravens**	**L** 17–23	0–6	M&T Bank Stadium	Recap
7	October 20	Jacksonville Jaguars	**L** 17–27	0–7	Paul Brown Stadium	Recap
8	October 27	at Los Angeles Rams	**L** 10–24	0–8	(United Kingdom) Wembley Stadium (London)	Recap
9	Bye					
10	November 10	**Baltimore Ravens**	**L** 13–49	0–9	Paul Brown Stadium	Recap
11	November 17	at Oakland Raiders	**L** 10–17	0–10	RingCentral Coliseum	Recap
12	November 24	**Pittsburgh Steelers**	**L** 10–16	0–11	Paul Brown Stadium	Recap
13	December 1	New York Jets	**W** 22–6	1–11	Paul Brown Stadium	Recap
14	December 8	at **Cleveland Browns**	**L** 19–27	1–12	FirstEnergy Stadium	Recap
15	December 15	New England Patriots	**L** 13–34	1–13	Paul Brown Stadium	Recap
16	December 22	at Miami Dolphins	**L** 35–38 (OT)	1–14	Hard Rock Stadium	Recap
17	December 29	**Cleveland Browns**	**W** 33–23	2–14	Paul Brown Stadium	Recap

Note: Intra-division opponents are in bold text.

=== Game summaries ===
==== Week 1: at Seattle Seahawks ====
Week One: Cincinnati Bengals at Seattle Seahawks – Game summary

Quarter	1	2	3	4	Total
Bengals	3	14	0	3	**20**
**Seahawks**	0	14	0	7	**21**

at CenturyLink Field, Seattle, Washington

- Date: September 8
- Game time: 4:05 p.m. EDT/1:05 p.m. PDT
- Game weather: Cloudy, 64 °F (18 °C)
- Game attendance: 68,710
- Referee: Brad Rogers
- TV announcers (CBS): Spero Dedes and Adam Archuleta
- Recap, Game Book

Game information

**First quarter**

- CIN – Randy Bullock 39-yard field goal, 2:48. Bengals 3–0. **Drive: 13 plays, 51 yards, 7:38.**

**Second quarter**

- SEA – Chris Carson 1-yard run (Jason Myers kick), 6:36. Seahawks 7–3. **Drive: 7 plays, 48 yards, 4:36.**
- CIN – John Ross 33-yard pass from Andy Dalton (Randy Bullock kick), 5:12. Bengals 10–7. **Drive: 3 plays, 75 yards, 1:24.**
- SEA – Chris Carson 10-yard pass from Russell Wilson (Jason Myers kick), 0:52. Seahawks 14–10. **Drive: 6 plays, 77 yards, 1:01.**
- CIN – John Ross 55-yard pass from Andy Dalton (Randy Bullock kick), 0:07. Bengals 17–14. **Drive: 4 plays, 75 yards, 0:45.**

**Third quarter**

- No scoring plays.

**Fourth quarter**

- SEA – Tyler Lockett 44-yard pass from Russell Wilson (Jason Myers kick), 14:53. Seahawks 21–17. **Drive: 4 plays, 64 yards, 2:08.**
- CIN – Randy Bullock 27-yard field goal, 7:00. Seahawks 21–20. **Drive: 13 plays, 67 yards, 7:53.**

**Top passers**

- CIN – Andy Dalton – 35/51, 418 yards, 2 TD
- SEA – Russell Wilson – 14/20, 196 yards, 2 TD

**Top rushers**

- CIN – Giovani Bernard – 7 rushes, 21 yards
- SEA – Chris Carson – 15 rushes, 46 yards, TD

**Top receivers**

- CIN – John Ross – 7 receptions, 158 yards, 2 TD
- SEA – DK Metcalf – 4 receptions, 89 yards

The Bengals began their season on the road against the Seahawks. In the first quarter, the Bengals scored first when Randy Bullock made a 39-yard field goal for a 3–0 lead and the only score of the period. In the second quarter, the Seahawks took the lead when Chris Carson ran for a 1-yard touchdown to make it 7–3. The Bengals retook the lead when John Ross III caught a 33-yard TD pass from Andy Dalton to make it 10–7. The Seahawks then went back into the lead when Carson caught a 10-yard TD pass from Russell Wilson to make it 14–10. Though, the Bengals moved back into the lead when Dalton found Ross III again on a 55-yard TD pass to make it 17–14 at halftime. After a scoreless third quarter, the Seahawks retook the lead when Tyler Lockett caught a 44-yard TD pass from Wilson to make it 21–17. Later on in the fourth quarter, Bullock got the Bengals within 1 when he kicked a 27-yard field goal to make it 21–20. The Bengals' defense forced the Seahawks to go 3 and out and got the ball back. Dalton had completed a 6-yard pass to Tyler Eifert. However, the Seahawks' defense stood up to Dalton on the next play and sacked him, resulting in a fumble which the Seahawks recovered, sealing the game.

With the loss, the Bengals started 0–1.

==== Week 2: vs. San Francisco 49ers ====
Week Two: San Francisco 49ers at Cincinnati Bengals – Game summary

Quarter	1	2	3	4	Total
**49ers**	14	10	10	7	**41**
Bengals	7	3	0	7	**17**

at Paul Brown Stadium, Cincinnati, Ohio

- Date: September 15
- Game time: 1:00 pm. EDT
- Game weather: Mostly sunny, 81 °F (27 °C)
- Game attendance: 50,666
- Referee: Tony Corrente
- TV announcers (Fox): Thom Brennaman, Chris Spielman and Shannon Spake
- Recap, Game Book

Game information

**First quarter**

- SF – Marquise Goodwin 38-yard pass from Jimmy Garoppolo (Robbie Gould kick), 11:21. 49ers 7–0. **Drive: 4 plays, 51 yards, 1:44.**
- CIN – Tyler Eifert 1-yard pass from Andy Dalton (Randy Bullock kick), 6:43. Tied 7–7. **Drive: 9 plays, 69 yards, 4:38.**
- SF – Raheem Mostert 39-yard pass from Jimmy Garoppolo (Robbie Gould kick), 2:36. 49ers 14–7. **Drive: 8 plays, 84 yards, 4:07.**

**Second quarter**

- SF – Jeff Wilson 2-yard run (Robbie Gould kick), 10:09. 49ers 21–7. **Drive: 6 plays, 58 yards, 2:40.**
- CIN – Randy Bullock 37-yard field goal, 6:57. 49ers 21–10. **Drive: 10 plays, 61 yards, 3:12.**
- SF – Robbie Gould 33-yard field goal, 0:02. 49ers 24–10. **Drive: 10 plays, 52 yards, 1:12.**

**Third quarter**

- SF – Deebo Samuel 2-yard pass from Jimmy Garoppolo (Robbie Gould kick), 12:10. 49ers 31–10. **Drive: 7 plays, 75 yards, 2:50.**
- SF – Robbie Gould 38-yard field goal, 4:34. 49ers 34–10. **Drive: 8 plays, 49 yards, 4:38.**

**Fourth quarter**

- SF – Jeff Wilson 4-yard run (Robbie Gould kick), 14:56. 49ers 41–10. **Drive: 6 plays, 82 yards, 3:13.**
- CIN – John Ross 66-yard pass from Andy Dalton (Randy Bullock kick), 0:45. 49ers 41–17. **Drive: 4 plays, 72 yards, 1:09.**

**Top passers**

- SF – Jimmy Garoppolo – 17/25, 297 yards, 3 TD, INT
- CIN – Andy Dalton – 26/42, 311 yards, 2 TD, INT

**Top rushers**

- SF – Matt Breida – 12 rushes, 121 yards
- CIN – Joe Mixon – 11 rushes, 17 yards

**Top receivers**

- SF – Deebo Samuel – 5 receptions, 87 yards, TD
- CIN – Tyler Boyd – 10 receptions, 122 yards

After a tough road loss, the Bengals went home to face the 49ers. The 49ers scored first when Marquise Goodwin caught a 38-yard TD pass from Jimmy Garoppolo to make it 7–0. The Bengals tied the game up at 7–7 when Andy Dalton found Tyler Eifert on a 1-yard TD pass. The 49ers however retook the lead when Garoppolo found Raheem Mostert on a 39-yard TD pass to make it 14–7. In the second quarter, the 49ers increased their lead when Jeff Wilson ran for a 2-yard TD to make it 21–7. The Bengals drew closer when Randy Bullock kicked a 37-yard field goal to make it 21–10. Though, the 49ers would move back into a 2-touchdown lead when Robbie Gould kicked a 33-yard field goal for a 24–10 halftime lead. In the third quarter, it was all 49ers when Garoppolo found Deebo Samuel on a 2-yard TD pass to make it 31–10. This would be followed by Gould kicking a 38-yard field goal to make it 34–10. By the fourth quarter, the 49ers pretty much sealed the game as Wilson ran for a 4-yard TD to make it 41–10. The scoring ended when Dalton found John Ross III on a late 66-yard TD pass to make the final score 41–17.

With the loss, the Bengals fell to 0–2.

==== Week 3: at Buffalo Bills ====
Week Three: Cincinnati Bengals at Buffalo Bills – Game summary

Quarter	1	2	3	4	Total
Bengals	0	0	7	10	**17**
**Bills**	8	6	0	7	**21**

at New Era Field, Orchard Park, New York

- Date: September 22
- Game time: 1:00 pm. EDT
- Game weather: Mostly sunny, 83 °F (28 °C)
- Game attendance: 69,448
- Referee: Clete Blakeman
- TV announcers (CBS): Tom McCarthy and Jay Feely
- Recap, Game Book

Game information

**First quarter**

- BUF – Dawson Knox 1-yard pass from Josh Allen (Josh Allen–Cole Beasley pass), 3:03. Bills 8–0. **Drive: 7 plays, 73 yards, 3:05.**

**Second quarter**

- BUF – Steven Hauschka 34-yard field goal, 10:29. Bills 11–0. **Drive: 10 plays, 46 yards, 5:37.**
- BUF – Steven Hauschka 45-yard field goal, 2:11. Bills 14–0. **Drive: 6 plays, 17 yards, 2:54.**

**Third quarter**

- CIN – Andy Dalton 1-yard run (Randy Bullock kick), 5:50. Bills 14–7. **Drive: 3 plays, 22 yards, 1:22.**

**Fourth quarter**

- CIN – Joe Mixon 1-yard pass from Andy Dalton (Randy Bullock kick), 12:27. Tied 14–14. **Drive: 11 plays, 82 yards, 5:33.**
- CIN – Randy Bullock 43-yard field goal, 4:54. Bengals 17–14. **Drive: 9 plays, 60 yards, 4:12.**
- BUF – Frank Gore 1-yard run (Steven Hauschka kick), 1:50. Bills 21–17. **Drive: 7 plays, 78 yards, 3:04.**

**Top passers**

- CIN – Andy Dalton – 20/36, 249 yards, TD, 2 INT
- BUF – Josh Allen – 23/36, 243 yards, TD, INT

**Top rushers**

- CIN – Joe Mixon – 15 rushes, 61 yards
- BUF – Frank Gore – 14 rushes, 76 yards, TD

**Top receivers**

- CIN – Auden Tate – 6 receptions, 88 yards
- BUF – Dawson Knox – 3 receptions, 67 yards, TD

The Bengals traveled for a Week 3 duel against the Bills. In the first half, it was all Bills scoring starting in the first quarter when they jumped out to a 14–0 lead before halftime. Though, the Bengals would respond by taking the lead well into the fourth quarter to make it 17–14, the Bills scored a late TD when Frank Gore ran it from a yard out. The Bengals got the ball with 1:50 left and drove to the Bills' 28-yard line where Andy Dalton threw the game losing interception on a 3rd and 5 sealing the 21–17 victory for the Bills.

With the loss, the Bengals fell to 0–3.

==== Week 4: at Pittsburgh Steelers ====
Week Four: Cincinnati Bengals at Pittsburgh Steelers – Game summary

Quarter	1	2	3	4	Total
Bengals	3	0	0	0	**3**
**Steelers**	0	10	14	3	**27**

at Heinz Field, Pittsburgh, Pennsylvania

- Date: September 30
- Game time: 8:15 pm. EDT
- Game weather: Clear, 76 °F (24 °C)
- Game attendance: 57,959
- Referee: Bill Vinovich
- TV announcers (ESPN): Joe Tessitore, Booger McFarland and Lisa Salters
- Recap, Game Book

Game information

**First quarter**

- CIN – Randy Bullock 28-yard field goal, 8:22. Bengals 3–0. **Drive: 4 plays, 5 yards, 0:54.**

**Second quarter**

- PIT – James Conner 21-yard pass from Mason Rudolph (Chris Boswell kick), 10:32. Steelers 7–3. **Drive: 5 plays, 46 yards, 2:40.**
- PIT – Chris Boswell 29-yard field goal, 0:58. Steelers 10–3. **Drive: 11 plays, 60 yards, 4:51.**

**Third quarter**

- PIT – Jaylen Samuels 2-yard run (Chris Boswell kick), 10:36. Steelers 17–3. **Drive: 8 plays, 75 yards, 4:24.**
- PIT – Diontae Johnson 43-yard pass from Mason Rudolph (Chris Boswell kick), 9:24. Steelers 24–3. **Drive: 2 plays, 43 yards, 0:11.**

**Fourth quarter**

- PIT – Chris Boswell 49-yard field goal, 5:51. Steelers 27–3. **Drive: 9 plays, 49 yards, 5:11.**

**Top passers**

- CIN – Andy Dalton – 21/37, 171 yards, INT
- PIT – Mason Rudolph – 24/28, 229 yards, 2 TD

**Top rushers**

- CIN – Joe Mixon – 15 rushes, 62 yards
- PIT – James Conner – 10 rushes, 42 yards

**Top receivers**

- CIN – Auden Tate – 4 receptions, 50 yards
- PIT – James Conner – 8 receptions, 83 yards, TD

The Bengals then traveled again to Pittsburgh to take on the 0–3 division rival Steelers. In the first quarter, the Bengals managed to make it 3–0 after Randy Bullock kicked a 28-yard field goal. However, from the second quarter on wards, it would be all Steelers scoring which would lead to the eventual final score of 27–3 and a win sealed for them.

With the loss, the Bengals fell to 0–4. The team also suffered its ninth straight loss to the Steelers and first 0-4 start since 2008.

==== Week 5: vs. Arizona Cardinals ====
Week Five: Arizona Cardinals at Cincinnati Bengals – Game summary

Quarter	1	2	3	4	Total
**Cardinals**	7	6	0	13	**26**
Bengals	3	3	3	14	**23**

at Paul Brown Stadium, Cincinnati, Ohio

- Date: October 6
- Game time: 1:00 pm. EDT
- Game weather: Cloudy, 76 °F (24 °C)
- Game attendance: 46,012
- Referee: John Hussey
- TV announcers (Fox): Thom Brennaman, Chris Spielman and Shannon Spake
- Recap, Game Book

Game information

**First quarter**

- CIN – Randy Bullock 23-yard field goal, 8:28. Bengals 3–0. **Drive: 12 plays, 65 yards, 5:39.**
- ARI – Kyler Murray 6-yard run (Zane Gonzalez kick), 3:40. Cardinals 7–3. **Drive: 9 plays, 68 yards, 4:48.**

**Second quarter**

- ARI – Zane Gonzalez 23-yard field goal, 5:09. Cardinals 10–3. **Drive: 12 plays, 75 yards, 5:01.**
- CIN – Randy Bullock 48-yard field goal, 3:27. Cardinals 10–6. **Drive: 5 plays, 20 yards, 1:42.**
- ARI – Zane Gonzalez 20-yard field goal, 0:00. Cardinals 13–6. **Drive: 12 plays, 73 yards, 3:27.**

**Third quarter**

- CIN – Randy Bullock 23-yard field goal, 8:34. Cardinals 13–9. **Drive: 15 plays, 70 yards, 6:26.**

**Fourth quarter**

- ARI – Zane Gonzalez 22-yard field goal, 13:25. Cardinals 16–9. **Drive: 7 plays, 38 yards, 3:12.**
- ARI – Chase Edmonds 37-yard run (Zane Gonzalez kick), 7:13. Cardinals 23–9. **Drive: 7 plays, 78 yards, 3:08.**
- CIN – Auden Tate 2-yard pass from Andy Dalton (Randy Bullock kick), 4:08. Cardinals 23–16. **Drive: 10 plays, 79 yards, 3:05.**
- CIN – Tyler Boyd 42-yard pass from Andy Dalton (Randy Bullock kick), 2:00. Tied 23–23. **Drive: 4 plays, 81 yards, 1:41.**
- ARI – Zane Gonzalez 31-yard field goal, 0:00. Cardinals 26–23. **Drive: 6 plays, 62 yards, 2:00.**

**Top passers**

- ARI – Kyler Murray – 20/32, 253 yards
- CIN – Andy Dalton – 27/38, 262 yards, 2 TD

**Top rushers**

- ARI – Kyler Murray – 10 rushes, 93 yards, TD
- CIN – Joe Mixon – 19 rushes, 93 yards

**Top receivers**

- ARI – David Johnson – 3 receptions, 65 yards
- CIN – Tyler Boyd – 10 receptions, 123 yards, TD

After another tough road loss, the Bengals returned home to face the Cardinals. The Bengals scored first when Randy Bullock kicked a 23-yard field goal to make it 3–0. The Cardinals however took the lead later in the quarter when Kyler Murray ran for a 4-yard TD to make it 7–3. The Cardinals made it 10–3 in the second quarter when Zane Gonzalez kicked a 23-yard field goal. Though, the Bengals would come within 4 when Bullock kicked a 48-yard field goal to make it 10–6. Gonzalez then put the Cardinals back up by a touchdown with a 20-yard field goal to make it 13–6 at halftime. In the third quarter, the Bengals came within 4 again as Bullock kicked yet another 23-yard field goal to make it 13–9. In the fourth quarter, the Cardinals would take a 2-touchdown lead when Gonzalez kicked a 22-yard field goal followed by Chase Edmonds running for a 37-yard TD for 16–9 and 23–9 leads. Andy Dalton then found Auden Tate on a 2-yard TD pass to make it 23–16. He would then find Tyler Boyd on a 42-yard TD pass to tie the game up at 23–23. The Cardinals got the ball back and the Bengals' defense stalled, allowing them to drive down the field and Gonzalez kicked the game-winning 31-yard field goal to make the final score 26–23.

With the loss, the Bengals dropped to 0–5. This would be the team's first such start since 2008.

==== Week 6: at Baltimore Ravens ====
Week Six: Cincinnati Bengals at Baltimore Ravens – Game summary

Quarter	1	2	3	4	Total
Bengals	7	3	0	7	**17**
**Ravens**	14	3	3	3	**23**

at M&T Bank Stadium, Baltimore, Maryland

- Date: October 13
- Game time: 1:00 pm. EDT
- Game weather: Cloudy, 64 °F (18 °C)
- Game attendance: 70,051
- Referee: Clay Martin
- TV announcers (CBS): Kevin Harlan, Rich Gannon and Jay Feely
- Recap, Game Book

Game information

**First quarter**

- CIN – Brandon Wilson 92-yard kickoff return (Randy Bullock kick), 14:48. Bengals 7–0. **Drive: 0 plays, 0 yards, 0:12.**
- BAL – Lamar Jackson 21-yard run (Justin Tucker kick), 11:28. Tied 7–7. **Drive: 6 plays, 75 yards, 3:20.**
- BAL – Mark Ingram II 1-yard run (Justin Tucker kick), 4:01. Ravens 14–7. **Drive: 10 plays, 66 yards, 6:07.**

**Second quarter**

- BAL – Justin Tucker 40-yard field goal, 14:48. Ravens 17–7. **Drive: 8 plays, 57 yards, 3:02.**
- CIN – Randy Bullock 22-yard field goal, 0:36. Ravens 17–10. **Drive: 7 plays, 35 yards, 0:49.**

**Third quarter**

- BAL – Justin Tucker 49-yard field goal, 0:02. Ravens 20–10. **Drive: 13 plays, 60 yards, 6:58.**

**Fourth quarter**

- BAL – Justin Tucker 21-yard field goal, 3:46. Ravens 23–10. **Drive: 18 plays, 83 yards, 9:46.**
- CIN – Andy Dalton 2-yard run (Randy Bullock kick), 1:28. Ravens 23–17. **Drive: 12 plays, 75 yards, 2:18.**

**Top passers**

- CIN – Andy Dalton – 21/39, 235 yards, INT
- BAL – Lamar Jackson – 21/33, 236 yards

**Top rushers**

- CIN – Alex Erickson – 1 rush, 17 yards
- BAL – Lamar Jackson – 19 rushes, 152 yards, TD

**Top receivers**

- CIN – Auden Tate – 5 receptions, 91 yards
- BAL – Mark Andrews – 6 receptions, 99 yards

The Bengals then traveled to take on the Ravens. In the first quarter, the Bengals scored first when Brandon Wilson returned a kickoff 92 yards for a TD. The Ravens however, took the lead when Lamar Jackson ran for a 21-yard TD to tie the game at 7–7 followed by Mark Ingram II's 1-yard TD run to make it 14–7. In the second quarter, the Ravens made it 17–7 when Justin Tucker kicked a 40-yard field goal. The Bengals were able to make it a 7-point deficit when Randy Bullock kicked a 22-yard field goal to make it 17–10 at halftime. In the third quarter, the Ravens moved up by double digits when Tucker kicked a 49-yard field goal to make it 20–10 for the quarter's only score. They would then make it 23–10 when Tucker kicked a 21-yard field goal. The Bengals then came within 6 when Andy Dalton ran for a 2-yard TD. Trying to get the ball back with seconds left, the Bengals tried for an onside kick. However, the Ravens recovered the ball and sealed their win and another Bengals loss.

With the loss, the Bengals dropped to 0–6.

==== Week 7: vs. Jacksonville Jaguars ====
Week Seven: Jacksonville Jaguars at Cincinnati Bengals – Game summary

Quarter	1	2	3	4	Total
**Jaguars**	0	6	3	18	**27**
Bengals	0	7	3	7	**17**

at Paul Brown Stadium, Cincinnati, Ohio

- Date: October 20
- Game time: 1:00 pm. EDT
- Game weather: Partly sunny, 70 °F (21 °C)
- Game attendance: 42,784
- Referee: Craig Wrolstad
- TV announcers (CBS): Kevin Harlan, Rich Gannon and Jay Feely
- Recap, Game Book

Game information

**First quarter**

- No scoring plays.

**Second quarter**

- JAX – Josh Lambo 21-yard field goal, 6:30. Jaguars 3–0. **Drive: 11 plays, 69 yards, 5:19.**
- CIN – Joe Mixon 2-yard pass from Andy Dalton (Randy Bullock kick), 1:25. Bengals 7–3. **Drive: 6 plays, 80 yards, 0:49.**
- JAX – Josh Lambo 29-yard field goal, 0:04. Bengals 7–6. **Drive: 9 plays, 64 yards, 1:21.**

**Third quarter**

- JAX – Josh Lambo 37-yard field goal, 6:52. Jaguars 9–7. **Drive: 12 plays, 38 yards, 6:28.**
- CIN – Randy Bullock 38-yard field goal, 0:31. Bengals 10–9. **Drive: 10 plays, 72 yards, 3:07.**

**Fourth quarter**

- JAX – Keelan Cole 2-yard pass from Gardner Minshew (Gardner Minshew-Chris Conley pass), 12:41. Jaguars 17–10. **Drive: 5 plays, 75 yards, 2:50.**
- JAX – Yannick Ngakoue 23-yard interception return (Josh Lambo kick), 4:18. Jaguars 24–10.
- JAX – Josh Lambo 26-yard field goal, 1:56. Jaguars 27–10. **Drive: 7 plays, 29 yards, 2:03.**
- CIN – Andy Dalton 1-yard run (Randy Bullock kick), 0:23. Jaguars 27–17. **Drive: 9 plays, 69 yards, 1:33.**

**Top passers**

- JAX – Gardner Minshew – 15/32, 255 yards, TD
- CIN – Andy Dalton – 22/43, 276 yards, TD, 3 INT

**Top rushers**

- JAX – Leonard Fournette – 29 rushes, 131 yards
- CIN – Andy Dalton – 4 rushes, 33 yards, 1 TD

**Top receivers**

- JAX – Dede Westbrook – 6 receptions, 103 yards
- CIN – Alex Erickson – 8 receptions, 137 yards

The Bengals then went back home for a game against the Jaguars. After a scoreless first quarter, the Jaguars would score first in the second quarter when Josh Lambo kicked a 21-yard field goal to make it 3–0. However, the Bengals were able to take the lead when Andy Dalton found Joe Mixon on a 2-yard TD pass. The Jaguars then came within a point when Lambo kicked a 29-yard field goal to make it 7–6 at halftime. In third quarter, the Jaguars moved into the lead when Lambo kicked a 37-yard field goal to make it 9–7. Though, the Bengals would regain the lead when Randy Bullock kicked a 38-yard field goal to make it 10–9. In the fourth quarter, the Jaguars took the lead back when Keelan Cole caught a 2-yard TD pass from Gardner Minshew (with a successful 2-point conversion) to make it 17–10. This would be followed by them sealing the game when Yannick Ngakoue returned an interception 23 yards for a TD followed by Lambo's 26-yard field goal to make it 24–10 and then 27–10. Dalton would run for a 1-yard TD with seconds left to make the final score 27–17.

With the loss, the Bengals fell to 0–7.

==== Week 8: at Los Angeles Rams ====
NFL London Games

Week Eight: Cincinnati Bengals at Los Angeles Rams – Game summary

Quarter	1	2	3	4	Total
Bengals	0	10	0	0	**10**
**Rams**	3	14	7	0	**24**

at Wembley Stadium, London, England

- Date: October 27
- Game time: 5:00 p.m. GMT/1:00 pm. EDT
- Game weather: Fair, 48 °F (9 °C)
- Game attendance: 83,720
- Referee: Jerome Boger
- TV announcers (CBS): Greg Gumbel, Trent Green and Melanie Collins
- Recap, Game Book

Game information

**First quarter**

- LAR – Greg Zuerlein 23-yard field goal, 6:41. Rams 3–0. **Drive: 12 plays, 85 yards, 6:05.**

**Second quarter**

- CIN – Randy Bullock 28-yard field goal, 14:57. Tied 3–3. **Drive: 11 plays, 65 yards, 6:44.**
- LAR – Josh Reynolds 31-yard pass from Jared Goff (Greg Zuerlein kick), 10:43. Rams 10–3. **Drive: 7 plays, 92 yards, 4:14.**
- CIN – Joe Mixon 1-yard pass from Andy Dalton (Randy Bullock kick), 5:18. Tied 10–10. **Drive: 11 plays, 75 yards, 5:25.**
- LAR – Cooper Kupp 65-yard pass from Jared Goff (Greg Zuerlein kick), 3:57. Rams 17–10. **Drive: 3 plays, 75 yards, 1:21.**

**Third quarter**

- LAR – Todd Gurley 3-yard run (Greg Zuerlein kick), 10:14. Rams 24–10. **Drive: 10 plays, 75 yards, 4:46.**

**Fourth quarter**

- No scoring plays.

**Top passers**

- CIN – Andy Dalton – 32/52, 329 yards, TD
- LAR – Jared Goff – 17/31, 372 yards, 2 TD

**Top rushers**

- CIN – Joe Mixon – 17 rushes, 66 yards
- LAR – Darrell Henderson – 11 rushes, 49 yards

**Top receivers**

- CIN – Alex Erickson – 6 receptions, 97 yards
- LAR – Cooper Kupp – 7 receptions, 220 yards, TD

After another tough loss at home, the Bengals traveled to London to take on the Rams. The Bengals were considered the away team for this game. In the first quarter, the Rams scored its only points with Greg Zuerlein's 23-yard field goal to make it 3–0. The Bengals tied it up in the second quarter when Randy Bullock kicked a 28-yard field goal to make it 3–3. The Rams retook the lead when Jared Goff found Josh Reynolds on a 31-yard TD pass to make it 10–3. However, the Bengals would tie it up again when Andy Dalton found Joe Mixon on a 1-yard TD pass to make it 10–10. The Rams moved back into the lead at halftime when Goff found Cooper Kupp on a 65-yard TD pass to make it 17–10. In the third quarter, the Rams would score the only points of the whole entire half when Todd Gurley II ran for a 3-yard TD to make it 24–10 as both teams headed into a scoreless fourth quarter, the Rams sealed the win, handing the Bengals yet another loss.

With the loss, the Bengals head into their bye week at 0–8. It would be the team's first such start since 2008 as they were also guaranteed their fourth straight non-winning season. This would happen for the first time since the 2001–2004 seasons. Andy Dalton became the first quarterback in NFL history to have starts of 8–0 (in 2015) and 0–8.

During the team's bye week, the Miami Dolphins defeated the New York Jets 26–18, making the Bengals the last winless team in 2019. Also during their bye week, the Bengals benched Dalton in favor of rookie fourth round draft pick Ryan Finley.

==== Week 10: vs. Baltimore Ravens ====
Week Ten: Baltimore Ravens at Cincinnati Bengals – Game summary

Quarter	1	2	3	4	Total
**Ravens**	14	14	21	0	**49**
Bengals	0	10	0	3	**13**

at Paul Brown Stadium, Cincinnati, Ohio

- Date: November 10
- Game time: 1:00 pm. EST
- Game weather: Sunny, 56 °F (13 °C)
- Game attendance: 45,918
- Referee: Scott Novak
- TV announcers (CBS): Kevin Harlan, Rich Gannon and Jay Feely
- Recap, Game Book

Game information

**First quarter**

- BAL – Mark Andrews 2-yard pass from Lamar Jackson (Justin Tucker kick), 12:18. Ravens 7–0. **Drive: 5 plays, 75 yards, 2:42.**
- BAL – Mark Ingram II 1-yard run (Justin Tucker kick), 3:54. Ravens 14–0. **Drive: 12 plays, 75 yards, 7:22.**

**Second quarter**

- CIN – Randy Bullock 42-yard field goal, 13:34. Ravens 14–3. **Drive: 10 plays, 52 yards, 5:20.**
- BAL – Mark Andrews 17-yard pass from Lamar Jackson (Justin Tucker kick), 9:28. Ravens 21–3. **Drive: 7 plays, 75 yards, 4:06.**
- BAL – Marcus Peters 89-yard interception return (Justin Tucker kick), 3:42. Ravens 28–3.
- CIN – Tyler Eifert 6-yard pass from Ryan Finley (Randy Bullock kick), 0:26. Ravens 28–10. **Drive: 10 plays, 70 yards, 3:16.**

**Third quarter**

- BAL – Lamar Jackson 47-yard run (Justin Tucker kick), 8:08. Ravens 35–10. **Drive: 3 plays, 64 yards, 1:25.**
- BAL – Marquise Brown 20-yard pass from Lamar Jackson (Justin Tucker kick), 5:13. Ravens 42–10. **Drive: 4 plays, 33 yards, 1:28.**
- BAL – Tyus Bowser 33-yard fumble return (Justin Tucker kick), 2:14. Ravens 49–10.

**Fourth quarter**

- CIN – Randy Bullock 39-yard field goal, 2:29. Ravens 49–13. **Drive: 10 plays, 38 yards, 5:42.**

**Top passers**

- BAL – Lamar Jackson – 15/17, 223 yards, 3 TD
- CIN – Ryan Finley – 16/30, 167 yards, TD, INT

**Top rushers**

- BAL – Lamar Jackson – 7 rushes, 65 yards, TD
- CIN – Joe Mixon – 30 rushes, 114 yards

**Top receivers**

- BAL – Marquise Brown – 4 receptions, 80 yards, TD
- CIN – Tyler Boyd – 6 receptions, 62 yards

Coming off their bye week, the Bengals went back home for their second game against the Ravens. The Ravens made it 7–0 in the first quarter when Lamar Jackson found Mark Andrews on a 2-yard TD pass. They would make it 14–0 when Mark Ingram II ran for a 1-yard TD. In the second quarter, the Bengals got on the board when Randy Bullock kicked a 42-yard field goal to make it 14–3. The Ravens then pulled away as Jackson found Andrews again on a 17-yard TD pass to make it 21–3. This would be followed by Marcus Peters returning an interception 89 yards for a touchdown to make it 28–3. The Bengals then made it 28–10 at halftime when Ryan Finley found Tyler Boyd on a 6-yard TD pass.

In the third quarter, it was all Ravens as they managed to score 3 touchdowns: First, Jackson ran for one from 47 yards out. This would be followed by him finding Marquise Brown on a 20-yard pass and then Tyus Bowser returned a fumble 33 yards to make the score 49–10. Bullock added a useless field goal late in the fourth quarter to make the final score 49–13.

With the loss, the Bengals fell to 0–9. It would be the team's first 0–9 start since 1993. They were also swept by the Ravens for the first time since 2011. The team is also assured their fourth consecutive losing season for the first time since 1999–2002.

==== Week 11: at Oakland Raiders ====
Week Eleven: Cincinnati Bengals at Oakland Raiders – Game summary

Quarter	1	2	3	4	Total
Bengals	7	0	3	0	**10**
**Raiders**	0	14	0	3	**17**

at RingCentral Coliseum, Oakland, California

- Date: November 17
- Game time: 4:25 pm. EST/1:25 pm. PST
- Game weather: Sunny, 76 °F (24 °C)
- Game attendance: 51,921
- Referee: Shawn Smith
- TV announcers (CBS): Greg Gumbel, Trent Green and Melanie Collins
- Recap, Game Book

Game information

**First quarter**

- CIN – Joe Mixon 3-yard run (Randy Bullock kick), 3:03. Bengals 7–0. **Drive: 12 plays, 85 yards, 6:27.**

**Second quarter**

- OAK – Foster Moreau 2-yard pass from Derek Carr (Daniel Carlson kick), 6:50. Tied 7–7. **Drive: 11 plays, 91 yards, 7:07.**
- OAK – Derek Carr 3-yard run (Daniel Carlson kick), 1:37. Raiders 14–7. **Drive: 10 plays, 80 yards, 3:39.**

**Third quarter**

- CIN – Randy Bullock 40-yard field goal, 7:25. Raiders 14–10. **Drive: 5 plays, 23 yards, 1:58.**

**Fourth quarter**

- OAK – Daniel Carlson 20-yard field goal, 9:12. Raiders 17–10. **Drive: 10 plays, 65 yards, 4:20.**

**Top passers**

- CIN – Ryan Finley – 13/31, 115 yards, INT
- OAK – Derek Carr – 25/29, 292 yards, TD, INT

**Top rushers**

- CIN – Joe Mixon – 15 rushes, 86 yards, TD
- OAK – Josh Jacobs – 23 rushes, 112 yards

**Top receivers**

- CIN – Auden Tate – 4 receptions, 56 yards
- OAK – Tyrell Williams – 4 receptions, 82 yards

After a horrifying loss at home, the Bengals traveled to take on the Raiders. The Bengals would score first when Joe Mixon ran for a 3-yard TD to make it 7–0 for the quarter's only score. In the second quarter, the Raiders responded with 2 touchdowns of their own: Derek Carr found Foster Moreau on a 2-yard TD pass and then Carr ran for another from 3 yards out to make it 7–7 and then 14–7 at halftime. In the third quarter, the Bengals came within 4 when Randy Bullock kicked a 40-yard field goal to make it 14–10 for the quarter's only score. In the fourth quarter, the Raiders moved ahead by a touchdown when Daniel Carson kicked a 20-yard field goal to make it 17–10. Getting the ball back later on in the quarter, Ryan Finley would be sacked. On the next play, he would throw the game-losing interception, sealing another Bengals loss.

With the loss, the Bengals fell to 0–10 for the first time since 1993 and were eliminated from postseason contention.

==== Week 12: vs. Pittsburgh Steelers ====
Week Twelve: Pittsburgh Steelers at Cincinnati Bengals – Game summary

Quarter	1	2	3	4	Total
**Steelers**	0	3	7	6	**16**
Bengals	0	7	3	0	**10**

at Paul Brown Stadium, Cincinnati, Ohio

- Date: November 24
- Game time: 1:00 pm. EST
- Game weather: Partly sunny, 46 °F (8 °C)
- Game attendance: 47,423
- Referee: Adrian Hill
- TV announcers (CBS): Andrew Catalon, James Lofton and John Schriffen
- Recap, Game Book

Game information

**First quarter**

- No scoring plays.

**Second quarter**

- PIT – Chris Boswell 26-yard field goal, 3:21. Steelers 3–0. **Drive: 9 plays, 40 yards, 5:12.**
- CIN – Tyler Boyd 15-yard pass from Ryan Finley. (Randy Bullock kick), 1:55. Bengals 7–3. **Drive: 3 plays, 69 yards, 1:26.**

**Third quarter**

- PIT – James Washington 79-yard pass from Devlin Hodges (Chris Boswell kick), 11:10. Steelers 10–7. **Drive: 3 plays, 83 yards, 1:26.**
- CIN – Randy Bullock 27-yard field goal, 5:07. Tied 10–10. **Drive: 9 plays, 68 yards, 3:03.**

**Fourth quarter**

- PIT – Chris Boswell 47-yard field goal, 11:59. Steelers 13–10. **Drive: 6 plays, 42 yards, 2:21.**
- PIT – Chris Boswell 26-yard field goal, 3:18. Steelers 16–10. **Drive: 7 plays, 35 yards, 1:53.**

**Top passers**

- PIT – Devlin Hodges – 5/11, 118 yards, TD
- CIN – Ryan Finley – 12/26, 192 yards, TD

**Top rushers**

- PIT – Benny Snell – 21 rushes, 98 yards
- CIN – Joe Mixon – 18 rushes, 79 yards

**Top receivers**

- PIT – James Washington – 3 receptions, 98 yards, TD
- CIN – Tyler Boyd – 5 receptions, 101 yards, TD

The Bengals then returned home for the second game of the season series against the Steelers. After a scoreless first quarter, the Steelers scored first when Chris Boswell kicked a 26-yard field goal to make it 3–0. The Bengals, however, would take the lead later on when Ryan Finley found Tyler Boyd on a 15-yard TD pass to make it 7–3 at halftime. In the third quarter, the Steelers retook the lead when Devlin Hodges found James Washington on a 79-yard TD pass to make it 10–7. The Bengals then tied the game up when Randy Bullock kicked a 27-yard field goal to make it 10–10. In the fourth quarter, the Steelers retook the lead with 2 field goals kicked by Boswell: from 47 and 26 yards out to make it 13–10 and then 16–10. The Bengals got the ball back later on in the quarter. The offense was able to drive to their own 29-yard line. However, on the next play, Finley was sacked, then he fumbled the ball, allowing the Steelers to recover it. The Bengals used up all their time outs before the Steelers were able to kneel out for victory, sealing yet another loss for the Bengals.

With their tenth straight loss to the Steelers, the Bengals fell to 0–11.

The next day, it was announced that Andy Dalton would start as quarterback again in week 13.

==== Week 13: vs. New York Jets ====
Week Thirteen: New York Jets at Cincinnati Bengals – Game summary

Quarter	1	2	3	4	Total
Jets	3	3	0	0	**6**
**Bengals**	7	10	5	0	**22**

at Paul Brown Stadium, Cincinnati, Ohio

- Date: December 1
- Game time: 1:00 pm. EST
- Game weather: Cloudy, 46 °F (8 °C)
- Game attendance: 39,804
- Referee: Ronald Torbert
- TV announcers (CBS): Spero Dedes and Adam Archuleta
- Recap, Game Book

Game information

**First quarter**

- NYJ – Sam Ficken 42-yard field goal, 9:08. Jets 3–0. **Drive: 13 plays, 51 yards, 5:52.**
- CIN – Tyler Boyd 17-yard pass from Andy Dalton (Randy Bullock kick), 1:12. Bengals 7–3. **Drive: 7 plays, 62 yards, 3:31.**

**Second quarter**

- CIN – Randy Bullock 24-yard field goal, 9:13. Bengals 10–3. **Drive: 9 plays, 39 yards, 4:57.**
- CIN – Joe Mixon 5-yard run (Randy Bullock kick), 1:46. Bengals 17–3. **Drive: 7 plays, 91 yards, 2:46.**
- NYJ – Sam Ficken 39-yard field goal, 0:04. Bengals 17–6. **Drive: 11 plays, 69 yards, 1:42.**

**Third quarter**

- CIN – Penalty on Kelvin Beachum enforced in end zone for a safety, 5:46. Bengals 19–6.
- CIN – Randy Bullock 47-yard field goal, 1:15. Bengals 22–6. **Drive: 8 plays, 29 yards, 4:31.**

**Fourth quarter**

- No scoring plays.

**Top passers**

- CIN – Andy Dalton – 22/37, 243 yards, TD
- NYJ – Sam Darnold – 28/48, 239 yards

**Top rushers**

- CIN – Joe Mixon – 19 rushes, 44 yards, TD
- NYJ – Le'Veon Bell – 10 rushes, 32 yards

**Top receivers**

- CIN – Tyler Boyd – 5 receptions, 59 yards, TD
- NYJ – Robby Anderson – 7 receptions, 101 yards

After yet another loss (and going 0–3 under Ryan Finley) and looking like the third team in the NFL to go 0–16 after the 2008 Detroit Lions and rival 2017 Cleveland Browns, the Bengals stayed home for a game against the Jets. The Jets scored first in the first quarter when Sam Ficken kicked a 42-yard field goal to make it 3–0. The Bengals took the lead later on in the quarter when Andy Dalton found Tyler Boyd on a 17-yard TD pass to make it 7–3. In the second quarter, the Bengals would make it 17–3 when Randy Bullock kicked a 24-yard field goal to make it 10–3 followed up by Joe Mixon running for a 5-yard TD. Ficken got the Jets within 11 as he kicked a 39-yard field goal to make it 17–6 at halftime. In the second half, it was all Bengals scoring as they put up a safety and field goal in the third quarter making it 22–6. A scoreless fourth quarter sealed the game for them and their first win of the season.

With the win, the Bengals won their first game of the season, improving to a record of 1–11. Andy Dalton also won his first game back as the starting QB.

==== Week 14: at Cleveland Browns ====
Week Fourteen: Cincinnati Bengals at Cleveland Browns – Game summary

Quarter	1	2	3	4	Total
Bengals	6	7	3	3	**19**
**Browns**	7	7	10	3	**27**

at FirstEnergy Stadium, Cleveland, Ohio

- Date: December 8
- Game time: 1:00 pm. EST
- Game weather: Sunny, 48 °F (9 °C)
- Game attendance: 67,431
- Referee: Carl Cheffers
- TV announcers (CBS): Beth Mowins and Tiki Barber
- Recap, Game Book

Game information

**First quarter**

- CIN – Randy Bullock 34-yard field goal, 10:56. Bengals 3-0. **Drive: 8 plays, 59 yards, 4:04.**
- CLE – Denzel Ward 61-yard interception return (Austin Seibert kick), 5:36. Browns 7-3.
- CIN – Randy Bullock 44-yard field goal, 1:37. Browns 7-6. **Drive: 7 plays, 50 yards, 3:59.**

**Second quarter**

- CIN – Joe Mixon 1-yard run (Randy Bullock kick), 12:07. Bengals 13-7. **Drive: 6 plays, 57 yards, 3:21.**
- CLE – Baker Mayfield 7-yard run (Austin Seibert kick), 6:37. Browns 14-13. **Drive: 10 plays, 75 yards, 5:30.**

**Third quarter**

- CLE – Kareem Hunt 3-yard run (Austin Seibert kick), 12:10. Browns 21-13. **Drive: 6 plays, 75 yards, 2:50.**
- CIN – Randy Bullock 28-yard field goal, 4:39. Browns 21-16. **Drive: 16 plays, 76 yards, 7:31.**
- CLE – Austin Seibert 53-yard field goal, 0:16. Browns 24-16. **Drive: 8 plays, 40 yards, 4:23.**

**Fourth quarter**

- CLE – Austin Seibert 31-yard field goal, 1:06. Browns 27-16. **Drive: 14 plays, 85 yards, 6:08.**

**Top passers**

- CIN – Andy Dalton – 22/38, 262 yards, INT
- CLE – Baker Mayfield – 11/24, 192 yards, 2 INT

**Top rushers**

- CIN – Joe Mixon – 23 rushes, 146 yards
- CLE – Nick Chubb – 15 rushes, 106 yards

**Top receivers**

- CIN – Tyler Boyd – 5 receptions, 75 yards
- CLE – Jarvis Landry – 4 receptions, 76 yards

After the win at home, the Bengals traveled to Cleveland for Battle Of Ohio Round 1 against the Browns. In the first quarter, the Bengals scored first when Randy Bullock kicked a 34-yard field goal to make it 3–0. The Browns got on the board and took the lead when Denzel Ward returned an interception 61 yards for a touchdown to make it 7–3. The Bengals came within a point later on in the quarter when Bullock kicked a 44-yard field goal to make it 7–6. In the second quarter, the Bengals were able to retake the lead when Joe Mixon ran for a 1-yard TD to make it 13–7. Though, the Browns regained the lead before halftime when Baker Mayfield ran for a 7-yard TD to make it 14–13. In the third quarter, the Browns increased their lead when Kareem Hunt ran for a 7-yard TD to make it 21–13. Though, the Bengals were able to come within 5 when Bullock hit yet another field goal from 28 yards out to make it 21–16. The Browns pulled away when Austin Seibert kicked a 53-yard field goal to make it 24–16. In the fourth quarter, the Browns pulled away by double digits when Seibert kicked another field goal from 31 yards out to make the score 27–16. The Bengals then came within 8 when Bullock kicked a 46-yard field goal to make it 27–19. Later on in the quarter, the Bengals tried for an onside kick. Though, the Browns would recover sealing the Bengals loss.

With the loss and their third straight to the Browns, the Bengals fell to 1–12. The team is also assured last place in the AFC North for the second straight season.

==== Week 15: vs. New England Patriots ====
Week Fifteen: New England Patriots at Cincinnati Bengals – Game summary

Quarter	1	2	3	4	Total
**Patriots**	7	6	14	7	**34**
Bengals	10	0	0	3	**13**

at Paul Brown Stadium, Cincinnati, Ohio

- Date: December 15
- Game time: 1:00 pm. EST
- Game weather: Cloudy, 36 °F (2 °C)
- Game attendance: 57,066
- Referee: Alex Kemp
- TV announcers (CBS): Andrew Catalon, James Lofton and Amanda Balionis
- Recap, Game Book

Game information

**First quarter**

- NE – James White 23-yard pass from Tom Brady (Nick Folk kick), 11:44. Patriots 7-0. **Drive: 8 plays, 75 yards, 3:16.**
- CIN - Cethan Carter 8-yard pass from Andy Dalton (Randy Bullock kick), 6:13. Tied 7-7. **Drive: 9 plays, 75 yards, 5:31.**
- CIN - Randy Bullock 34-yard field goal, 0:14. Bengals 10-7. **Drive: 9 plays, 49 yards, 5:02.**

**Second quarter**

- NE - Nick Folk 40-yard field goal, 3:51. Tied 10-10. **Drive: 8 plays, 47 yards, 3:18.**
- NE - Nick Folk 46-yard field goal, 0:05. Patriots 13-10. **Drive: 4 plays, -5 yards, 1:25.**

**Third quarter**

- NE - N'Keal Harry 7-yard pass from Tom Brady (Nick Folk kick), 11:17. Patriots 20-10. **Drive: 7 plays, 43 yards, 2:59.**
- NE - Stephon Gilmore 64-yard interception return (Nick Folk kick), 7:21. Patriots 27-10.

**Fourth quarter**

- CIN - Randy Bullock 48-yard field goal, 6:33. Patriots 27-13. **Drive: 13 plays, 41 yards, 5:38.**
- NE - Rex Burkhead 33-yard run (Nick Folk kick), 5:31. Patriots 34-13. **Drive: 2 plays, 40 yards, 1:02.**

**Top passers**

- CIN – Andy Dalton – 17/31, 151 yards, TD, 4 INT
- NE – Tom Brady – 15/29, 128 yards, 2 TD

**Top rushers**

- CIN – Joe Mixon – 25 rushes, 136 yards
- NE – Sony Michel – 19 rushes, 89 yards

**Top receivers**

- CIN – Tyler Eifert – 3 receptions, 44 yards
- NE – James White – 3 receptions, 49 yards

After another tough road loss, the Bengals went home to take on the Patriots. The Pats scored first in the first quarter when Tom Brady found James White on a 23-yard TD pass to make it 7–0. The Bengals then managed to tie it up and then take the lead when Cethan Carter caught an 8-yard TD pass from Andy Dalton to make it 7–7, followed by Randy Bullock kicking a 34-yard field goal to make it 10–7. In the second quarter, it was all Pats when Nick Folk kicked 2 field goals: from 40 and 46 yards out to make the score 10–10 and then give his team a 13–10 halftime lead. In the third quarter, the Pats went back to work as Brady found N'Keal Henry on a 7-yard TD pass to make it 20–10, followed by Stephon Gilmore returning an interception 64 yards for a touchdown to make it 27–10. The Bengals came within 2 touchdowns in the fourth when Bullock kicked a 48-yard field goal to make it 27–13. However, the Pats wrapped up the scoring of the game when Rex Burkhead ran for a 33-yard touchdown to make the final score 34–13, sealing another loss for the Bengals.

With the loss, the Bengals fell to 1–13. Andy Dalton also put up a new record of games started and lost in a single season, surpassing the 9 losses from the 2016 season.

==== Week 16: at Miami Dolphins ====
Week Sixteen: Cincinnati Bengals at Miami Dolphins – Game summary

Quarter	1	2	3	4	OT	Total
Bengals	0	6	6	23	0	**35**
**Dolphins**	14	7	7	7	3	**38**

at Hard Rock Stadium, Miami Gardens, Florida

- Date: December 22
- Game time: 1:00 pm. EST
- Game weather: Cloudy, 76 °F (24 °C)
- Game attendance: 60,968
- Referee: Brad Allen
- TV announcers (CBS): Andrew Catalon and James Lofton
- Recap, Game Book

Game information

**First quarter**

- MIA – Christian Wilkins 1-yard pass from Ryan Fitzpatrick (Jason Sanders kick), 8:32. Dolphins 7-0. **Drive: 12 plays, 75 yards, 6:28.**
- MIA – DeVante Parker 7-yard pass from Ryan Fitzpatrick (Jason Sanders kick), 5:00. Dolphins 14-0. **Drive: 7 plays, 75 yards, 1:54.**

**Second quarter**

- CIN – Randy Bullock 20-yard field goal, 10:49. Dolphins 14-3. **Drive: 12 plays, 78 yards, 6:29.**
- MIA – Mike Gesicki 31-yard pass from Ryan Fitzpatrick (Jason Sanders kick), 2:20. Dolphins 21-3. **Drive: 6 plays, 87 yards, 2:48.**
- CIN – Randy Bullock 57-yard field goal, 0:02. Dolphins 21-6. **Drive: 8 plays, 46 yards, 0:51.**

**Third quarter**

- MIA – Mike Gesicki 13-yard pass from Ryan Fitzpatrick (Jason Sanders kick), 8:24. Dolphins 28-6. **Drive: 9 plays, 83 yards, 4:34.**
- CIN – Tyler Boyd 34-yard pass from Andy Dalton (pass failed), 3:38. Dolphins 28-12. **Drive: 10 plays, 75 yards, 4:46.**

**Fourth quarter**

- MIA – Myles Gaskin 2-yard run (Jason Sanders kick), 11:12. Dolphins 35-12. **Drive: 9 plays, 45 yards, 4:03.**
- CIN – C. J. Uzomah 8-yard pass from Andy Dalton (Randy Bullock kick), 6:11. Dolphins 35-19. **Drive: 10 plays, 72 yards, 5:01.**
- CIN – Tyler Boyd 3-yard pass from Andy Dalton (Tyler Eifert pass from Andy Dalton), 0:29. Dolphins 35-27. **Drive: 14 plays, 63 yards, 2:38.**
- CIN – Tyler Eifert 25-yard pass from Andy Dalton (Andy Dalton run), 0:00. Tied 35-35. **Drive: 4 plays, 54 yards, 0:29.**

**Overtime**

- MIA – Jason Sanders 37-yard field goal, 0:00. Dolphins 38-35. **Drive: 10 plays, 51 yards, 3:19.**

**Top passers**

- CIN – Andy Dalton – 33/56, 396 yards, 4 TD
- MIA – Ryan Fitzpatrick – 31/52, 419 yards, 4 TD, INT

**Top rushers**

- CIN – Joe Mixon – 21 rushes, 50 yards
- MIA – Myles Gaskin – 16 rushes, 55 yards

**Top receivers**

- CIN – Tyler Boyd – 9 receptions, 128 yards, 2 TD
- MIA – DeVante Parker – 5 receptions, 111 yards, TD

The Bengals headed down south to take on the Dolphins in head coach Zac Taylor's first return to Miami in 4 years. Taylor served as the quarterbacks coach/offensive coordinator for the Dolphins under then-head coach Joe Philbin from 2012-2015. In the first quarter, it was all Dolphins when Ryan Fitzpatrick found Christian Wilkins on a 1-yard TD pass to make it 7–0. They would make it 14–0 when DeVante Parker caught a 7-yard TD pass from Fitzpatrick. The Bengals were able to get on the board in the second quarter when Randy Bullock kicked a 20-yard field goal to make it 14–3. However, the Dolphins made it 21–3 when Fitzpatrick found Mike Gesicki on a 31-yard TD pass. Bullock ended the scoring of the half when he kicked a 57-yard field goal for a halftime score of 21–6. In the third quarter, Fitzpatrick for Gesicki again on a 13-yard TD pass to make it 28–6. The Bengals drew closer when Andy Dalton found Tyler Boyd on a 34-yard TD pass (with a failed two-point conversion) to make it 28–12. The Dolphins pulled away in the fourth quarter when Myles Gaskin ran for a 2-yard touchdown. However, the Bengals were able to tie the game up late in the quarter when first Dalton found C. J. Uzomah on an 8-yard TD pass to make it 35–19, followed by Dalton finding Tyler Boyd on a 2-yard TD pass (with a successful 2-point conversion) to make it 35–27. After recovering the onside kick, the Bengals drove down the field to tie the game up at 35–35 after Dalton found Tyler Eifert on a 25-yard TD pass (with another successful two-point conversion) at the end of regulation. In overtime however, after going back and forth with the ball, the Dolphins were able to drive down the field in the final seconds. This allowed Jason Sanders to kick the game-winning 37-yard field goal for the final score 38–35.

With the loss, the Bengals fell to 1–14. The team would also clinch the first overall pick in the 2020 Draft.

==== Week 17: vs. Cleveland Browns ====
Week Seventeen: Cleveland Browns at Cincinnati Bengals – Game summary

Quarter	1	2	3	4	Total
Browns	7	9	0	7	**23**
**Bengals**	13	7	3	10	**33**

at Paul Brown Stadium, Cincinnati, Ohio

- Date: December 29
- Game time: 1:00 pm. EST
- Game weather: Rain, 64 °F (18 °C)
- Game attendance: 47,759
- Referee: Adrian Hill
- TV announcers (Fox): Brandon Gaudin, Robert Smith and Megan Olivi
- Recap, Game Book

Game information

**First quarter**

- CLE – Damion Ratley 46-yard pass from Baker Mayfield (Austin Seibert kick), 13:32. Browns 7-0. **Drive: 3 plays, 56 yards, 1:28.**
- CIN – C. J. Uzomah 15-yard pass from Andy Dalton (Randy Bullock kick), 9:53. Tied 7-7. **Drive: 7 plays, 79 yards, 3:39.**
- CIN – Joe Mixon 3-yard run (kick failed), 4:45. Bengals 13-7. **Drive: 3 plays, 3 yards, 0:43.**

**Second quarter**

- CIN – Andy Dalton 5-yard run (Randy Bullock kick), 10:06. Bengals 20-7. **Drive: 12 plays, 66 yards, 5:42.**
- CLE – Austin Seibert 42-yard field goal, 6:53. Bengals 20-10. **Drive: 7 plays, 62 yards, 3:13.**
- CLE – Jarvis Landry 56-yard pass from Baker Mayfield (kick failed), 1:52. Bengals 20-16. **Drive: 5 plays, 81 yards, 1:52.**

**Third quarter**

- CIN – Randy Bullock 47-yard field goal, 9:04. Bengals 23-16. **Drive: 10 plays, 46 yards, 5:56.**

**Fourth quarter**

- CIN – Joe Mixon 2-yard run (Randy Bullock kick), 14:16. Bengals 30-16. **Drive: 9 plays, 74 yards, 5:16.**
- CLE – Odell Beckham Jr. 20-yard pass from Baker Mayfield (Austin Seibert kick), 7:16. Bengals 30-23. **Drive: 13 plays, 75 yards, 7:00.**

**Top passers**

- CIN – Andy Dalton – 16/28, 190 yards, TD, INT
- CLE – Baker Mayfield – 12/27, 279 yards, 3 TD, 3 INT

**Top rushers**

- CIN – Joe Mixon – 26 rushes, 162 yards
- CLE – Nick Chubb – 13 rushes, 41 yards

**Top receivers**

- CIN – Tyler Boyd – 5 receptions, 59 yards
- CLE – Jarvis Landry – 2 receptions, 82 yards, TD

With the win, the Bengals ended their season with a 2–14 record and avoided setting a new franchise-worst regular season record. This was their only win against an AFC North opponent as they managed to snap their 3-game losing streak to the Browns. This marked Andy Dalton's final game as a Bengal, as he was released the following offseason.

=== Standings ===
==== Division ====
AFC North
	W	L	T	PCT	DIV	CONF	PF	PA	STK
^{(1)} Baltimore Ravens	14	2	0	.875	5–1	10–2	531	282	W12
Pittsburgh Steelers	8	8	0	.500	3–3	6–6	289	303	L3
Cleveland Browns	6	10	0	.375	3–3	6–6	335	393	L3
Cincinnati Bengals	2	14	0	.125	1–5	2–10	279	420	W1

==== Conference ====
AFC
#	Team	Division	W	L	T	PCT	DIV	CONF	SOS	SOV	STK
**Division leaders**
1	Baltimore Ravens	North	14	2	0	.875	5–1	10–2	.494	.484	W12
2 (Note: Kansas City claimed the No. 2 seed over New England based on head-to-head victory.)	Kansas City Chiefs	West	12	4	0	.750	6–0	9–3	.510	.477	W6
3	New England Patriots	East	12	4	0	.750	5–1	8–4	.469	.411	L1
4	Houston Texans	South	10	6	0	.625	4–2	8–4	.520	.488	L1
**Wild Cards**
5	Buffalo Bills	East	10	6	0	.625	3–3	7–5	.461	.363	L2
6	Tennessee Titans	South	9	7	0	.563	3–3	7–5	.488	.465	W1
**Did not qualify for the postseason**
7	Pittsburgh Steelers	North	8	8	0	.500	3–3	6–6	.502	.324	L3
8 (Note: Denver finished ahead of Indianapolis and NY Jets based on conference record. Division tiebreak was initially used to eliminate Oakland (see below).) (Note: Denver finished ahead of Oakland based on conference record.)	Denver Broncos	West	7	9	0	.438	3–3	6–6	.510	.406	W2
9 (Note: Oakland and Indianapolis finished ahead of NY Jets based on conference record.) (Note: Oakland finished ahead of Indianapolis based on head-to-head victory.)	Oakland Raiders	West	7	9	0	.438	3–3	5–7	.482	.335	L1
10	Indianapolis Colts	South	7	9	0	.438	3–3	5–7	.492	.500	L1
11	New York Jets	East	7	9	0	.438	2–4	4–8	.473	.402	W2
12 (Note: Jacksonville finished ahead of Cleveland based on record against common opponents. Jacksonville's cumulative record against Cincinnati, Denver, NY Jets, and Tennessee was 4–1, compared to Cleveland's 2–3 cumulative record against the same four teams.)	Jacksonville Jaguars	South	6	10	0	.375	2–4	6–6	.484	.406	W1
13	Cleveland Browns	North	6	10	0	.375	3–3	6–6	.533	.479	L3
14 (Note: LA Chargers finished ahead of Miami based on head-to-head victory.)	Los Angeles Chargers	West	5	11	0	.313	0–6	3–9	.514	.488	L3
15	Miami Dolphins	East	5	11	0	.313	2–4	4–8	.484	.463	W2
16	Cincinnati Bengals	North	2	14	0	.125	1–5	2–10	.553	.406	W1
**Tiebreakers** (Note: When breaking ties for three or more teams under the NFL's rules, they are first broken within divisions, then comparing only the highest ranked remaining team from each division.)
