= Chesley (name) =

Chesley is both a given name and a surname. Notable people with the name include:

== Given name ==
- Chesley Bonestell (1888–1986), American artist
- Chesley William Carter (1902–1994), Canadian politician
- Chesley Crosbie (1905–1962), Canadian businessman and politician
- Chesley V. Morton (born 1951), American politician, stockbroker
- Chesley G. Peterson (1920–1990), United States Air Force general
- Chesley Sullenberger (born 1951), American pilot
- Chesley Goseyun Wilson (1932–2021), American musician

== Surname ==
- Al Chesley (born 1957), American football player
- Frank Chesley (born 1955), American football player
- Anthony Chesley (born 1996), American football player
- John Alexander Chesley (1837–1922), Canadian businessman and politician
- Moses Chesley, American politician
- Paul Chesley (born 1940), American photojournalist
- Robert Chesley (1943–1990), American composer and playwright
- Ryan Chesley (born 2004), American ice hockey player
- Solomon Yeomans Chesley (1796–1880), Canadian politician
- Stanley M. Chesley (1936–2025), American lawyer

== See also ==
- Cheslie, given name
