= Moses (given name) =

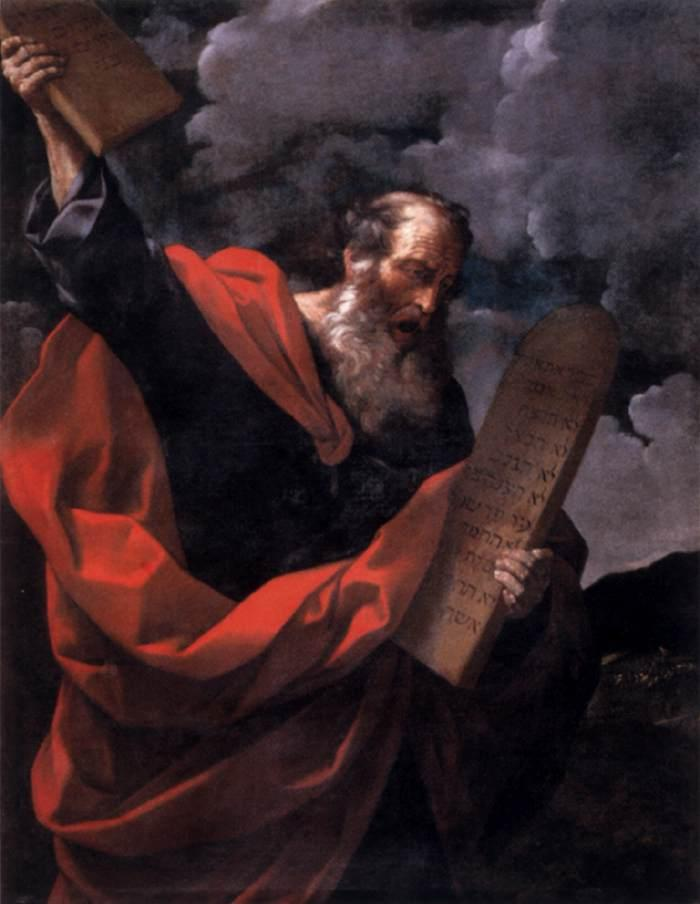
- Moses
- Pronunciation: Moses
- Gender: Male
- Language: Hebrew

Origin
- Origin: Egyptian
- Meaning: Save from the water

Other names
- Variant forms: Moïse, Moishe, Moshe, Moss, Mousa, Moussa, Movses, Moyses, Mozes, Musa
- Nicknames: Moishe, Moysh, Maish, Moeez, Mo, Moyshee, Musie

Moses (Biblical Greek: Μωυσῆς Mōusês; Koine Greek: Μωσῆς Mōsês), (Note: from Latin and Greek) Moises, Moyses (Koine Greek: Μωϋσῆς Mōüsês), Moishe (Yiddish: משה), (Note: from Yiddish) Moshe (Hebrew: מֹשֶׁה), (Note: from Modern Hebrew) Musa (Arabic: موسی), (Note: from Arabic) or Movses (Armenian: Մովսես) (Note: from Armenian) is a male given name, after the biblical figure Moses.

An Egyptian root msy ('child of') has been considered as a possible etymology, arguably an abbreviation of a theophoric name, as for example in Egyptian names like Thutmose ('child of Thoth') and Ramesses ('child of Ra'), with the god's name omitted. However, the biblical scholar Kenneth Kitchen argued that this – or any Egyptian origin for the name – was unlikely, as the sounds in the Hebrew m-š-h do not correspond to the pronunciation of Egyptian msy in the relevant time period. The linguist Abraham Yahuda, based on the spelling given in the Tanakh, argues that it combines "water" or "seed" and "pond, expanse of water," thus yielding the sense of "child of the Nile" (mw-š).

The Hebrew etymology in the Biblical story may reflect an attempt to cancel out traces of Moses' Egyptian origins. The Egyptian character of his name was recognized as such by ancient Jewish writers like Philo and Josephus. Philo linked Moses's name (rendered Μωυσῆς Mōusês in the Septuagint, then later Μωσῆς Mōsês and Μωϋσῆς Mōüsês in the New Testament) to the Egyptian (Coptic) word for 'water' (möu, μῶυ), in reference to his finding in the Nile and the biblical folk etymology. (Note: εἶτα δίδωσιν ὄνομα θεμένη Μωυσῆν ἐτύμως διὰ τὸ ἐκ τοῦ ὕδατος αὐτὸν ἀνελέσθαι· τὸ γὰρ ὕδωρ μῶυ ὀνομάζουσιν Αἰγύπτιοι — Philo of Alexandria, De Vita Mosis, I:4:17. Translation: "Since he had been taken up from the water, the princess gave him a name derived from this, and called him Moses, for Möu is the Egyptian word for water." — Colson, F. H., trans. 1935. On Abraham. On Joseph. On Moses, (Loeb Classical Library 289). Cambridge, Massachusetts: Harvard University Press. pp. 284–85.) Josephus, in his Antiquities of the Jews, claims that the second element, -esês, meant 'those who are saved'. The problem of how an Egyptian princess, known to Josephus as Thermutis (identified as Tharmuth) and to 1 Chronicles 4:18 as Bithiah, could have known Hebrew puzzled medieval Jewish commentators like Abraham ibn Ezra and Hezekiah ben Manoah. Hezekiah suggested she either converted or took a tip from Jochebed.

According to the Torah, the name "Moses" comes from the Hebrew verb, meaning "to pull out/draw out" [of water], and the infant Moses was given this name by the Pharaoh's daughter after she rescued him from the Nile (Exodus 2:10) Since the rise of Egyptology and decipherment of hieroglyphs, it was postulated that the name of Moses, with a similar pronunciation as the Hebrew Moshe, is the Egyptian word for son, with Pharaoh names such as Thutmose and Ramesses roughly translating to "son of Thoth" and "son of Ra," respectively.

There are various ways of pronouncing the Hebrew name of Moses, for example in Ashkenazi western European it would be pronounced Mausheh, in Eastern Europe Moysheh, in northern Islamic countries Moussa, and in Yemen Mesha. The nicknames are accordingly Moishe, Moysh, Maish, Moeez, Mo, Moyshee, Musie (pronounced Mooziyeh).

Jews named with the Hebrew name of Moses, commonly held a similar name in the language of the countries where they were born or lived. In Europe they were named Maurici, Maurice, Morris, Mauricio. In Arabic speaking countries, along with Musa or Moussa – the Arabic name for Moses, they were also named Mustafa.

== People with this name ==
=== Ancient times ===
- Moses, an important figure in the Torah
- Moses of Alexandria, alchemist
- Moses (bishop of the Arabs) (c. 389), saint, first Arab bishop of the Arab people
- Moses the Black (330–405), saint, ascetic monk and priest in Egypt, a Desert Father

=== Medieval ===
- Moses of Chorene (5th century; Armenian: Մովսես Խորենացի, Movsēs Xorenac'i), Armenian historian, "father of Armenian history"
- Moses of Kalankatuyk (7th century; Armenian: Մովսէս Կաղանկատուացի, Movses Kaġankatvac'i), Armenian historian
- Moses the Calm (8th century; Arabic: موسى الكاظم, Mūsá al-Kādhim), Twelver Shia imam
- Moses the Hungarian (990s–1043; Russian: Моисей Угрин, Moisey Ugrin), Russian saint
- Moses ibn Ezra (1070–1138), Jewish, Spanish philosopher
- Moses Kimhi (died c. 1190), medieval rabbi from Hachmei Provence, Occitania (modern France)
- Moses Maimonides (1135–1204), Spanish rabbi, physician, and philosopher
- Moses de León (c. 1250–1305; Hebrew: משה בן שם-טוב, Moshe ben Shem-Tov), Spanish rabbi who is thought to have composed the Zohar
- Moses Shirvani, Jewish writer who authored a Hebrew/Aramaic–Persian dictionary in 1459

=== Early modern to 18th century ===
- Moses ben Jacob Cordovero (1522–1570; Hebrew: משה קורדובירו, Moshe Kordovero), a central figure in the historical development of Kabbalah, also known as Ramak (רמ״ק)
- Moses Holden (1777–1864), English astronomer
- Moses Isserles (1530–1572; Hebrew: משה בן ישראל איסרלישׂ, Polish: Mojżesz ben Israel Isserles), Polish Ashkenazic rabbi and talmudist
- Moses Amyraut (1596–1664; also Moïse Amyraut), French theologian and metaphysician
- Moses Cordovero (17th century), Italian physician
- Moses Mendelssohn (1729–1786), German Jewish philosopher
- Moses Robinson (1741–1813), judge, governor, and senator from Vermont
- Moses Cleaveland (1754–1806), surveyor of the Connecticut Land Company and founder of Cleveland, Ohio
- Moses Sofer (1762–1839; Yiddish: משה סופר), a leading Orthodox rabbi of European Jewry in the early 19th century
- Moses Montefiore (1784–1885), sheriff of London
- Moses Grandy (1786–unknown), African-American author, abolitionist, and enslaved person.

=== Modern ===
- Moses Alexander (1853–1932), former governor of Idaho
- Moses Barrett III (born 1973), African–American hip hop artist, better known by his stage name Petey Pablo
- Moses Michael Levi Barrow (born Jamal Michael Barrow; 1978), better known by his stage name Shyne, Belizean rapper and politician
- Moses Bloom (1833–1893), American politician, the first Jewish mayor of a major American city (Iowa City, Iowa)
- Moses Brown (basketball) (born 1999), American basketball player
- Moses Chesley, American politician
- Moses Costa (1950–2020), Bangladeshi Roman Catholic prelate
- Moses Dickson (1824–1901), American abolitionist
- Moses Dyer (born 1997), New Zealand association footballer
- Moses J. Epstein (c. 1911–1960), New York assemblyman
- Moses Jacob Ezekiel (1844–1917), American-Jewish sculptor
- Moses Filho (born 2001), Brazilian politician
- Moses Harrison (1932–2013), American jurist
- Moses Hess (1812–1875), French-Jewish Zionist
- Moses Hogan (1957–2003), American composer and arranger of spirituals
- Moe Howard (born Moses Horwitz; 1897–1975), one of the Three Stooges
- Moses Hurvitz (1844–1910), Galician-born Jewish playwright
- Moses H. W. Chan (born 1946), Chinese-American physicist
- Moses Ingram, African American actress
- Moses Isegawa (born 1963), Ugandan author
- Moses Kekūāiwa (1829–1848), Hawaiian prince
- Moses Kotane (1905–1978), South African anti-apartheid activist, Secretary-General of the South African Communist Party from 1939 to 1978
- Moses Lairy (1859–1927), Justice of the Indiana Supreme Court
- Moses Malone (1955–2015), American basketball player
- Moses Martin, the son of Gwyneth Paltrow and Chris Martin
- Moses McKissack III (1879–1952), African American architect
- Moses Mbye (born 1993), Australian Rugby League player of Gambian descent
- Moses ka Moyo (1977–2018), South African journalist and activist
- Moses Monroe (1842–1895), Irish-born businessman and politician in Newfoundland
- Moses Regular (born 1971), American football player
- Moses Rosen (1912–1994), Romanian rabbi
- Moses Josef Rubin, (1892–1980), Hasidic Jewish cleric in Romania and, later, in New York City
- Moses Russell, (1888–1946) Welsh footballer
- Moses Sherman (1853–1932), American land developer in Arizona and California
- Moses Sithole (born 1964), South African serial killer and rapist
- Moses Turay (born 2004), Sierra Leonean footballer
- Moses M. Weinstein (1912–2007), American politician
- Moses Wood (born 1999), American basketball player

== Fictional characters ==
- Moses the raven in Animal Farm

== Bibliography ==
- Hanks, Patrick and Flavia Hodges, Oxford Dictionary of Names, (1988), Oxford University Press, ISBN 0-19-211592-8

== See also ==
- Moises (disambiguation)
