= Moishe =

Moishe is a masculine given name, the Yiddish version of Moses. It may refer to:

== Given name ==
- Moishe Broderzon (1890–1956), Yiddish poet and theater director
- Moishe Finkel (c. 1850–1904), Romanian-born American Yiddish theater actor and manager who attempted to kill his wife
- Moishe Hurvitz (1844–1910), also known as Moses Horowitz, Austro-Hungarian-born American Yiddish theater playwright and actor
- Moishe Levy, birth name of Morris Levy (1927–1990), American music industry entrepreneur, convicted extortionist and swindler
- Moishe Lewis (1888–1950), Jewish labour activist
- Moishe Lowtzky (1881–1940), Ukrainian–Polish chess master
- Moishe Mana (born 1956), Israeli-born American businessman and real estate developer
- Moishe Miller, birth name of Robert Merrill (1917–2004), American operatic baritone and actor
- Moishe Oysher (1906–1958), American cantor, recording artist and actor
- Moishe Postone (1942–2018), Canadian historian and social theorist
- Moishe Rosen (1932–2010), American minister and founder of the organization Jews for Jesus
- Moishe Segel, birth name of Marc Chagall (1887–1985), Russian and French artist
- Moishe Tokar (fl. 1905–1910), Jewish anarchist who attempted to assassinate Russian general Sergei Gershelman
- Moishe Zilberfarb (1876–1934), Ukrainian Jewish politician and activist

== Pen name ==
- Moishe or Moyshe Nadir, pen name of Yitzchak Rayz (1885–1943), Austro-Hungarian-born American Yiddish language writer and satirist
