= Chesley =

Chesley can refer to:

== Places ==
- Chesley, Ontario, Canada, a community
- Chesley, Aube, France, a commune
- 12104 Chesley, an asteroid

== Others ==
- Chesley (name)
- Chesley Awards for artistic achievement in science fiction and fantasy art
