= Kragthorpe =

Kragthorpe is a surname. Notable people with the name include:

- Dave Kragthorpe (born 1933), American football player and coach, father of Steve
- Steve Kragthorpe (1965–2024), American college football head coach, father of Brad
- Brad Kragthorpe (born 1992), American football coach, son of Steve
