= Jemal Singleton =

American football coach (born 1975)

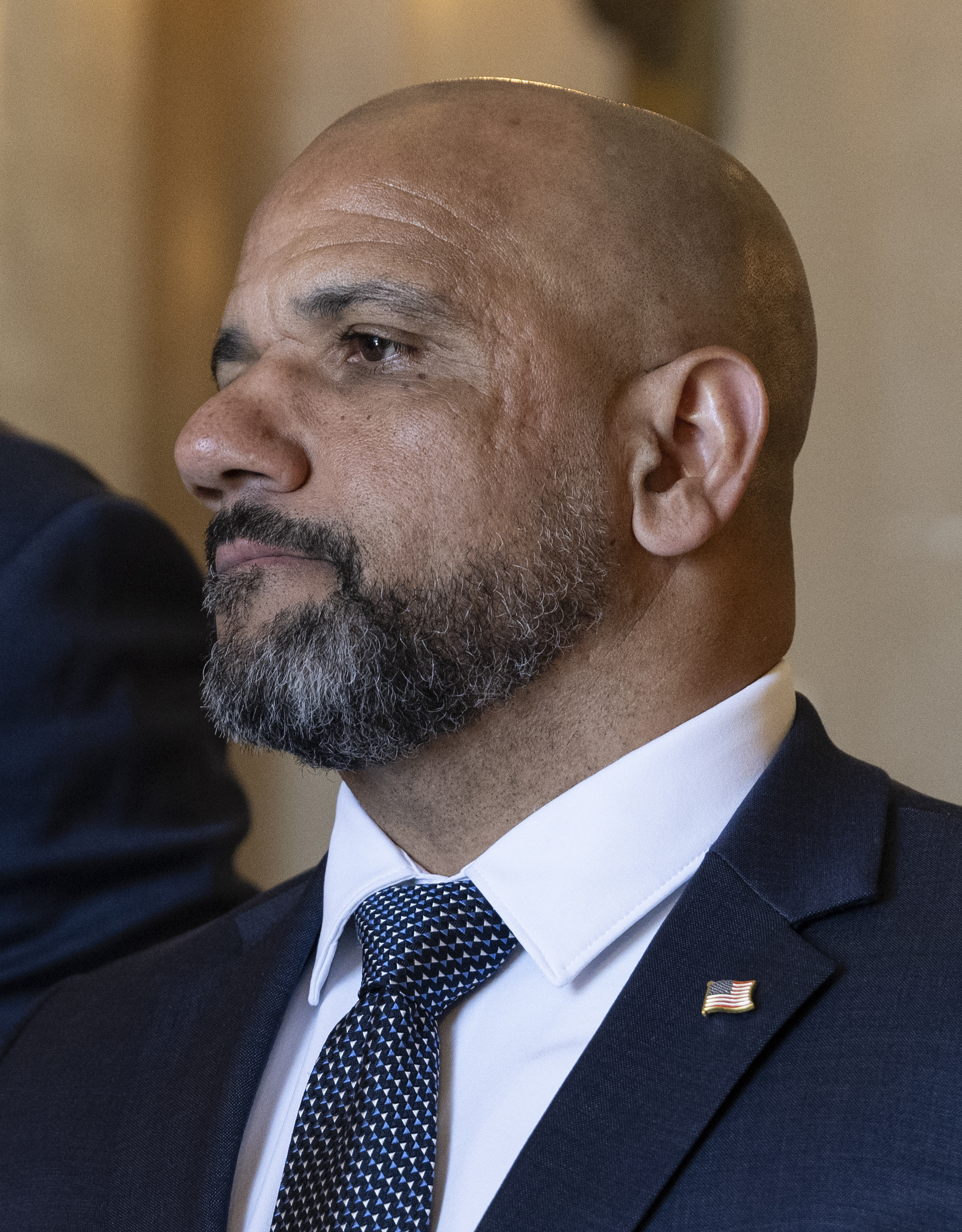
- Singleton in 2025

Philadelphia Eagles
- Title: Assistant head coach & running backs coach

Personal information
- Born: December 7, 1975 (age 50); İncirlik, Turkey

Career information
- College: Air Force

Career history
- Air Force (2000) Prep assistant; Air Force (2003–2005) Varsity assistant; Air Force (2006–2010) Running backs coach; Oklahoma State (2011–2014) Running backs coach; Arkansas (2015) Running backs coach & special teams coordinator; Indianapolis Colts (2016–2017) Running backs coach; Oakland Raiders (2018) Running backs coach; Cincinnati Bengals (2019–2020) Running backs coach; Philadelphia Eagles (2021–present) Assistant head coach & running backs coach

Awards and highlights
- Super Bowl champion (LIX)

Jemal Singleton (born December 7, 1975) is an American football coach who is the assistant head coach and running backs coach for the Philadelphia Eagles of the National Football League (NFL). He previously served as an assistant coach for the Cincinnati Bengals, Oakland Raiders, Indianapolis Colts, University of Arkansas, Oklahoma State University–Stillwater and the United States Air Force Academy.

== Coaching career ==
=== Air Force ===
In 2000, Singleton began his coaching career at the United States Air Force Academy, his alma mater, as a prep assistant. In 2003, Singleton was hired as a varsity assistant coach. In 2006, Singleton was promoted to running backs coach.

=== Oklahoma State ===
In 2011, Singleton joined as the running backs coach at Oklahoma State University–Stillwater.

=== Arkansas ===
In 2015, Singleton was hired by the University of Arkansas as their running backs coach.

=== Indianapolis Colts ===
In 2016, Singleton was hired by the Indianapolis Colts as their running backs coach under head coach Chuck Pagano. In his two seasons with Indianapolis, Singleton helped Frank Gore amass 1,986 rushing yards, the ninth-most in the NFL during that span. Gore came just shy of 1,000 yards in 2017, finishing 12th in the NFL with 961 yards on the ground. In 2016, he guided Gore to his ninth 1,000-yard season, becoming the first Colts rusher to eclipse 1,000 yards since RB Joseph Addai in 2007, and also becoming the first running back age 33-or-older to rush for at least 1,000 yards since John Riggins in 1984 (fourth player overall).

=== Oakland Raiders ===
On January 11, 2018, Singleton was hired by the Oakland Raiders as their running backs coach under head coach Jon Gruden.

=== Cincinnati Bengals ===
On February 10, 2019, Singleton was hired by the Cincinnati Bengals as their running backs coach under head coach Zac Taylor.

=== Kentucky Wildcats ===
On January 7, 2021 Singleton was hired by the University of Kentucky as their running backs coach and special teams coordinator.

=== Philadelphia Eagles ===
On February 8, 2021, Singleton was hired by the Philadelphia Eagles as their assistant head coach and running backs coach under head coach Nick Sirianni, replacing Duce Staley. He was part of the coaching staff that won Super Bowl LIX over the Kansas City Chiefs.

== Personal life ==
Singleton is married to his wife, Jennifer, and they have two daughters together.

In 1999, Singleton graduated from the United States Air Force Academy with a bachelor's degree in social sciences.
