= Movsesian =

Movsesian or Movsesyan (Armenian: Մովսիսյան) is an Armenian surname, meaning "son of Movses (Moses)". It may refer to

- Alexander Movsesyan, Armenian playwright and novelist
- Aris Movsesijan, Serbian screenwriter, movie director, writer blogger, politician and dentist
- Gegard Mousasi, Iranian-Armenian MMA multichampion from The Netherlands.
- Sergei Movsesian, Armenian chess Grandmaster
- Sona Movsesian, American media personality and assistant to late night talk show host Conan O'Brien
- Yura Movsisyan, Armenian-American retired footballer, one of Armenia's top goalscorers ever.
