= Movses =

Movses (Armenian: Մովսես) is an Armenian given name, equivalent to Moses. It gave rise to the surname Movsesian.

Movses may also refer to:

== Catholicoi of the Armenian Apostolic Church ==
- Moses I and Moses II, catholicoi of all Armenians during the Dvin era
- Moses III of Armenia (1629–1632) - Catholicos Movses III of Tatev

== Given name ==
- Movses Abelian, Armenian-Georgian diplomat and United Nations official
- Movses Baghramian, 18th-century Armenian writer and activist
- Movses Gorgisyan (1961–1990), Armenian independence activist
- Movses Hakobyan (born 1965), Armenian general
- Movses Kaghankatvatsi, 7th-century historian of Caucasian Albania
- Movses Karapetyan (born 1978), Armenian wrestler
- Movses Khorenatsi (410–490s), Armenian historian and author of History of Armenia
- Movses Silikyan (1862–1937), Armenian general
