= Kerry Wynn =

American football player (born 1991)

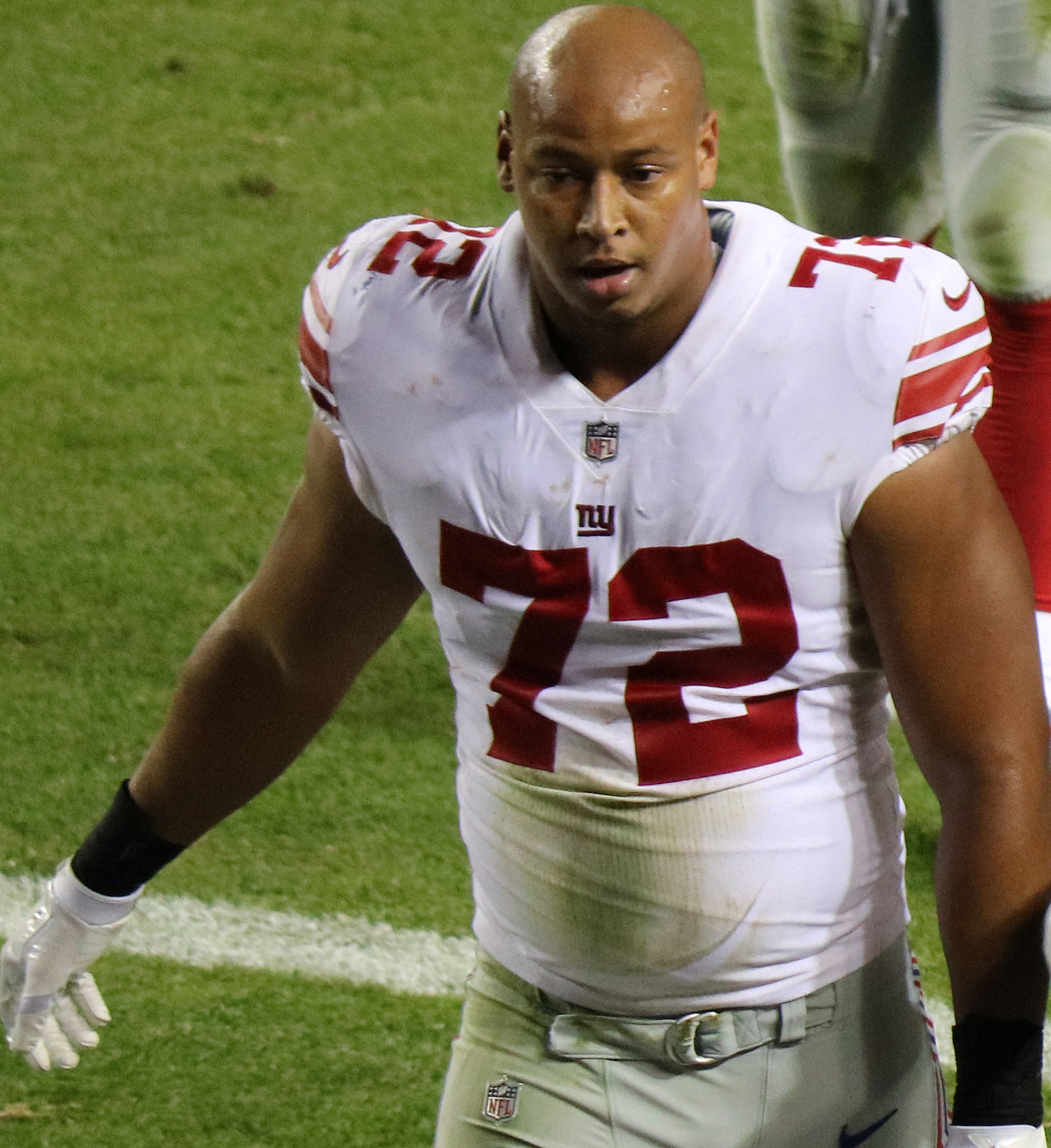
- Wynn with the New York Giants in 2017

No. 72
- Position: Defensive end

Personal information
- Born: February 1, 1991 (age 35); Louisa, Virginia, U.S.
- Listed height: 6 ft 5 in (1.96 m)
- Listed weight: 261 lb (118 kg)

Career information
- High school: Louisa County (Mineral, Virginia)
- College: Richmond
- NFL draft: 2014: undrafted

Career history
- New York Giants (2014–2018); Cincinnati Bengals (2019)

Career NFL statistics
- Total tackles: 143
- Sacks: 4.5
- Forced fumbles: 2
- Fumble recoveries: 3
- Interceptions: 1
- Stats at Pro Football Reference

Kerry Wynn (born February 1, 1991) is an American former professional football player who was a defensive end in the National Football League (NFL). He went on to play college football for the Richmond Spiders and was signed by the New York Giants as an undrafted free agent in 2014.

== Early life ==
Wynn attended Louisa County High School in Mineral, VA where he graduated in 2009. He played for legendary east coast high school football coach Mark Fischer while at Louisa County High School.

== College career ==
In 2009, Wynn was redshirted in college where he led his team with 14 tackles and sacks. In 2010 due to an injury he only played three games. Wynn came back the next two years starting nearly every game in 2011 and leading the team again with 4 sacks and 7 tackles for a loss, and starting every game in 2012 leading the team with 4.5 sacks and 8 tackles for a loss. In 2013, Wynn became a third-team All-CAA selection after he started 10 games and recorded a career-high 11 tackles against North Carolina State University.

== Professional career ==
Pre-draft measurables
Height	Weight	Arm length	Hand span	40-yard dash	10-yard split	20-yard split	20-yard shuttle	Three-cone drill	Vertical jump	Broad jump	Bench press
6 ft 4 7/8 in (1.95 m)	266 lb (121 kg)	31 3/4 in (0.81 m)	9 1/8 in (0.23 m)	4.70 s	1.64 s	2.70 s	4.73 s	7.53 s	34.0 in (0.86 m)	9 ft 5 in (2.87 m)	31 reps
All values from NFL Combine/Pro Day

=== New York Giants ===
Wynn signed with the New York Giants as an undrafted free agent on May 13, 2014.

Set to be a restricted free agent, Wynn signed his contract tender on April 18, 2017, to remain with the Giants.

On March 19, 2018, Wynn re-signed with the Giants.

=== Cincinnati Bengals ===
On March 22, 2019, Wynn signed a contract with the Cincinnati Bengals. He was placed on injured reserve on October 14, 2019, with a concussion.

== NFL career statistics ==
Legend
**Bold**	Career high

=== Regular season ===
Year	Team	Games		Tackles					Interceptions					Fumbles			
Year	Team	GP	GS	Cmb	Solo	Ast	Sck	TFL	Int	Yds	TD	Lng	PD	FF	FR	Yds	TD
2014	NYG	5	0	17	13	4	**1.5**	2	**1**	**7**	0	**7**	1	0	**1**	0	0
2015	NYG	**15**	**7**	**53**	**33**	**20**	0.0	**5**	0	0	0	0	**2**	0	**1**	0	0
2016	NYG	14	0	12	6	6	0.5	0	0	0	0	0	0	0	**1**	0	0
2017	NYG	**15**	3	19	14	5	1.0	1	0	0	0	0	0	0	0	0	0
2018	NYG	14	5	39	24	15	**1.5**	3	0	0	0	0	**2**	**2**	0	0	0
2019	CIN	2	0	3	0	3	0.0	0	0	0	0	0	0	0	0	0	0
		65	15	143	90	53	4.5	11	1	7	0	7	5	2	3	0	0

=== Playoffs ===
Year	Team	Games		Tackles					Interceptions					Fumbles			
Year	Team	GP	GS	Cmb	Solo	Ast	Sck	TFL	Int	Yds	TD	Lng	PD	FF	FR	Yds	TD
2016	NYG	**1**	0	**1**	**1**	0	**1.0**	**1**	0	0	0	0	0	0	0	0	0
		1	0	1	1	0	1.0	1	0	0	0	0	0	0	0	0	0
