= Sergei Konstantinovich Gershelman =

Russian general (1854–1910)

Sergey Konstantinovich Gershelman
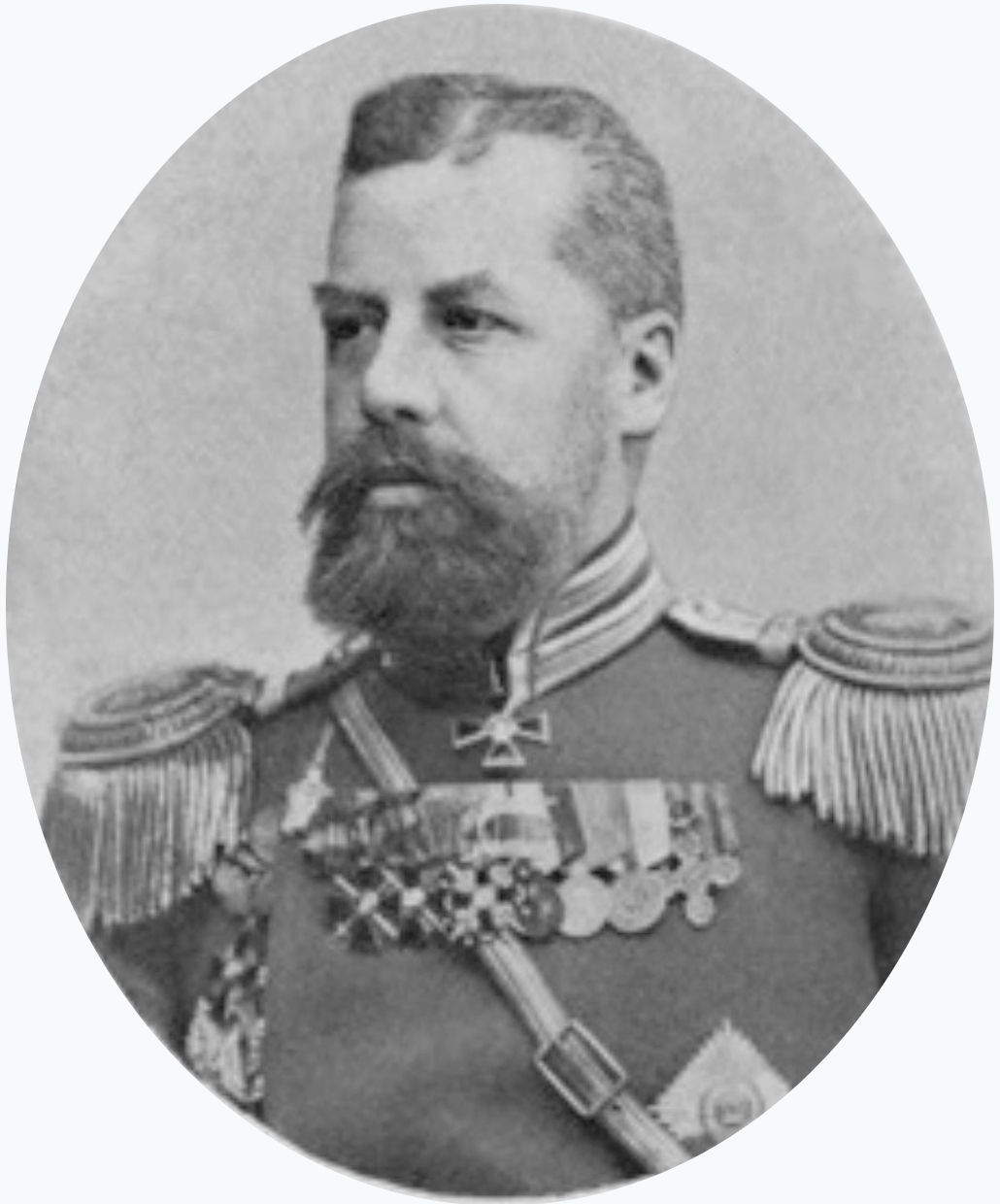
- Born: 26 June 1854
- Died: 10 October 1910 (aged 56); Vilno, Russian Empire
- Military career
- Allegiance: Russia
- Branch: Imperial Russian Army
- Service years: 1852–1910
- Rank: General
- Commands: 12th Army Corps; 16th European Army Corps; Third Manchurian Army
- Conflicts: Russo-Turkish War; Russo-Japanese War

Sergey Konstantinovich Gershelman (Russian: Серге́й Константинович Гершельман; 26 June 1854 – 17 October 1910) was an Imperial Russian Army general of German descent who fought in the Russo-Japanese War and served as the governor-general of Moscow.

== Ancestry ==
Although it has been claimed, even by Sergei Witte, that Gershelman's ancestors were baptized Jews, they were actually of German extraction.

Gershelman came from the German noble but untitled family of Hörschelmann (or Hoerschelmann), his great-grandfather, Ernst August Wilhelm Hörschelmann von Epichnellen, migrated from Thuringia to Revel (also known as Reval; today's Tallinn). Ernst's son (and Sergey's grandfather), Johann Wilhelm, served as the castellan of Tsar Paul I's palace in Peterhof, while Johann's son (and Sergei's father) Konstantin Peter Friedrich was a general in the Imperial Russian Army.

German names starting with an "H" have traditionally been transcribed into Russian with a Cyrillic 'Г', while Russian 'Г' is usually Romanized as G. Therefore, Gershelman's name usually appears in English with a G, unlike that of his German ancestors.

== Biography ==
In 1872, Sergey Gershelman graduated from the Page Corps, an elite school for the children of Russian nobility with honors. He joined the Imperial Guard as a warrant officer. In 1877, already as a Stabs-Captain, he entered the General Staff Academy, but soon left to take part in the Russo-Turkish War, where he participated in a number of battles, including Tashkessen, Plovdiv and Adrianople, where he was wounded. He was decorated with several medals, including the Order of St Vladimir 4th class.

After the war, Gershelman returned to the Staff Academy, and graduated in 1881, with an appointment to the General Staff. After serving in positions of increasing responsibility, including commanding the 93rd Irkutsk Infantry Regiment; he was promoted to major general in 1898, with an appointment as the chief of staff of the 2nd Army Corps, based in Grodno, near the western border of the empire. There he had a chance to meet Pyotr Stolypin, who served in Grodno as an Acting Governor in 1902–1903. From Grodno, Gershelman was transferred to Omsk, where served as the Chief of Staff of the Western Siberian Military District. He was promoted to lieutenant general in 1904 at the start of the Russo-Japanese War.

As commander of the 9th infantry Division of the First Siberian Army Corps, he fought at the Battle of Liaoyang. He commanded this division during the entire war to the Battle of Mukden, earning the nickname of the "Iron General" and a reputation as one of the best Russian generals.

As Russia's defeat by Japan led to the First Russian Revolution, Gershelman was appointed, on 15 January 1906, the commander of the Moscow Military District. After Moscow's Governor General Fyodor Dubasov was wounded by a bomb in April of the same year, Gershelman was appointed as his replacement, taking up this position on 5 July 1906. He energetically fought to suppress the revolution, and supported the Black Hundreds. During Gershlman's term as Governor General of Moscow, the area under his jurisdiction was expanded, to include not only the city proper but also the adjacent section of Moskovsky Uyezd.

Gershelman's gubernatorial service earned him effusive praise from the local conservative newspaper, Moskovskiye Vedomosti, which was to write later in his obituary (18 November 1910):

During the difficult times of the post-revolutionary chaos, [Gershelman] was appointed... to this position of responsibility, and with his indefatigable efforts and unfailing vigilance and energy he maintained strict order in the most difficult circumstances. Clearly and sincerely expressing his allegiance to the Russian-ness (русские начала), Governor General invigorated the hearts of the Moscovites confused by the [government's] appeasement measured toward the revolution, and encouraged the same kind of allegiance to the Russian-ness among the population, which had always professed allegiance to the Orthodoxy, the Throne, and the Fatherland, but had been confused by the triumph of the anti-Russian forces.

Meanwhile, the more urbane Sergei Witte described Gershelman as a "brave general, but without any political culture", and a "spiritual ally of the Union of the Russian People".

The revolutionary opponents of the government referred to the Governor General as a "hangman", and tried to assassinate him. On 21 November 1907, a bomb was thrown toward his horse-sled by a Socialist-Revolutionary. Gershelman's horses were killed, but due to the cold weather, the force of the explosive was reduced, and the general himself merely lost the badge from his uniform hat. The would-be assassin, 30-year-old Alexandra Sevastyanova, a paramedic by profession, was severely injured in the explosion, apprehended, and promptly hanged.

On 17 March 1909, Gershelman was appointed the commanding general of the Vilno Military District, near the Empire's western border. He continued as Moscow's Acting Governor General until 15 April, and then moved to Vilna. Towards the end of his career wrote a number of works on military psychology. On 6 December 1909, another attempt was made to assassinate Gershelman. A Jewish anarchist named Moishe Tokar shot at Gershelman as he drove his carriage through the street. Gershelman was uninjured and Tokar was captured and sentenced to death. The next year Gershelman was promoted to the rank of General of Infantry; soon after, on 17 November 1910, he died of an illness.

The general was buried in his family's vault in Alexander Nevsky Lavra in Saint Petersburg.
