= Paul Chesley =

American photojournalist

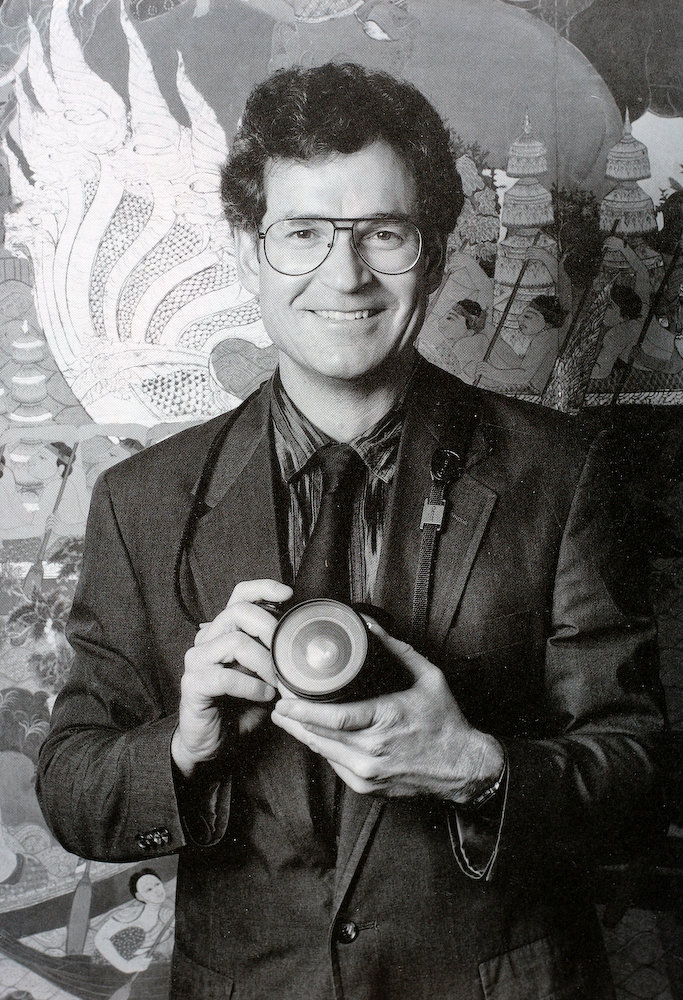
Paul Chesley

Paul Chesley is an American photojournalist born in Red Wing, Minnesota who is best known for his work as a photographer for the National Geographic Society.

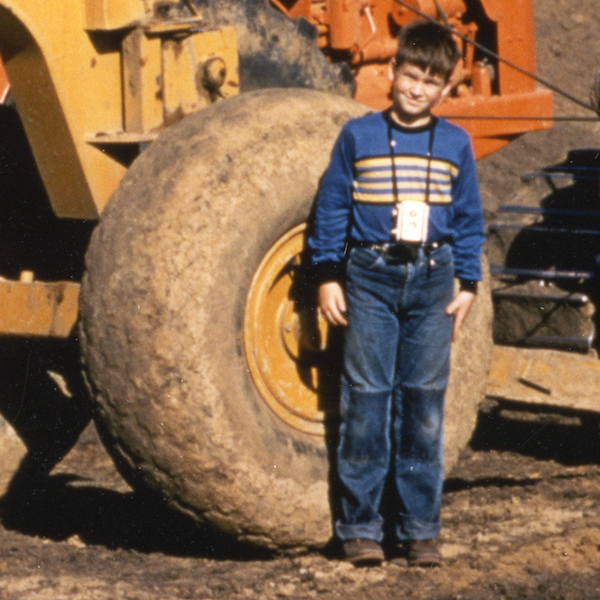
Paul Chesley with his first camera.

== Career ==
Paul Chesley was introduced to the art of photography by his father at the age of three when he was given his first camera. He grew up taking pictures on family vacations and developing film in his dad's darkroom. Chesley's early work focused on natural subjects and landscapes and in the early 1970s he began taking photography classes at Colorado Mountain College as well as participating in workshops at the Center of the Eye in Aspen, Colorado. Chesley also participated as a student on a National Geographic workshop led by Robert Gilka, the society's director of photography. Chesley began shooting assignments for National Geographic in 1975 and has since completed more than 35 projects for the society. His photography has focused primarily on people and cultures in Oceania, Asia and Europe. In 1984, Chesley helped found Photographers/Aspen, a photo collective of four National Geographic photographers. In 1989, Chesley met and became friends with Hunter S. Thompson while producing a story on Aspen for Life magazine.

In an interview with Stephen Metcalf for Accent Thai magazine Chesley stated that he doesn't consider himself a schooled photographer. ‘Almost everything I’ve learned has come from my experience in the field’ he says. According to John Agnone, National Geographic book editor, Chesley '...Takes graphically strong images that communicate the essence of his subjects – and he makes it look easy.' When asked to describe Chesley's style of photography, Carole Lee a former project coordinator for Chesley stated ‘Paul's sensitivity captures the gentle spirit in people.’ Fellow Minnesotan and National Geographic photographer Jim Brandenburg said of Paul, 'With so many photographers out there constantly boasting about their work, Paul contradicts the profession. Chesley holds his projects very dear. he goes about his work in a quiet but dignified and steadfast way. And most of all, he lets his work speak for itself.'

== Recognition ==
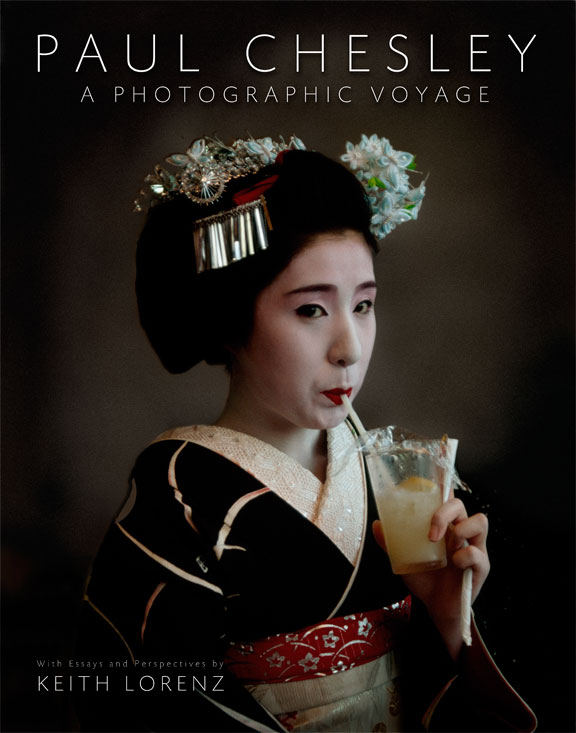
Paul Chesley – A Photographic Voyage

Chesley's work was included in the National Geographic Society's first major exhibition, The Art of Photography at National Geographic; A 100-Year Retrospective, held at the Corcoran Gallery of Art in Washington, D.C. in 1988. His images have also been exhibited in museums in London, Tokyo, New York, and Honolulu. His photographic essays have been featured regularly in Life, Fortune, GEO, Stern, Newsweek, and Time. In 2006 Chesley received a Pele award of excellence for photographs contributed to a public service print project titled Our Liliha. In 2013 Goff Books published a retrospective of Chesley's career titled Paul Chesley A Photographic Voyage.

== Bibliography ==
- Robbins, Michael; Paul Chesley (1981). High Country Trail Along the Continental Divide. National Geographic Society. ISBN 0-87044-366-6.
- Allen, Leslie; Paul Chesley; Jim Brandenburg; Annie Griffiths (1983). America's Hidden Corners. National Geographic Society. ISBN 0-87044-441-7.
- Mason, Robert; Inset page 168-196 Paul Chesley (1983). Photojournalism. Time-Life. ISBN 978-0-8094-4429-8.
- Fisher, Ron; Paul Chesley; Nicholas DeVore III; David Hiser (1985). Blue Horizons. National Geographic Society. ISBN 0-87044-544-8.
- Perry, John; Paul Chesley (1987). "Continental Airlines Pacific Travelogue". No. Special Edition. Continental Airlines.
- Chiu, Tony; Paul Chesley (December 1989). "Aspen". Time-Life.
- Dunn, Margery; Cover photo and multiple insets by Paul Chesley (1989). Exploring Your World. National Geographic Society. ISBN 0-87044-727-0.
- Brower, Kenneth; Multiple insets Paul Chesley (1990). One Earth. HarperCollins. ISBN 0-00-637660-6.
- Thompson, Hunter; cover photo by Paul Chesley (1990). Songs of The Doomed. Fodor's. ISBN 0-330-32005-X.
- Cohen, David; Multiple insets by Paul Chesley (1991). The Circle of Life. HarperCollins. ISBN 0-06-250152-6.
- Lynn, Dianna; Yoshiaki Nagashima, Nicholas DeVore III, Paul Chesley, David Hiser, Chris Rainier and Melinda Berge (1991). One World One Child. ARC International Ltd. ISBN 4-900422-03-7.
- Klusmire, Jon; Paul Chesley (1992). Colorado. Compass American Guides. ISBN 1-878867-07-5.
- Warren, William; Paul Chesley (1995). Bangkok. Archipelago Press. ISBN 981-3018-16-X.
- Thybony, Scott; Paul Chesley (1996). The Rockies Pillars of a Continent. National Geographic Society. ISBN 0-7922-2970-3.
- Cohen, David; Multiple insets by Paul Chesley (1996). Jerusalem In The Shadow Of Heaven. HarperCollins. ISBN 0-00-225095-0.
- Wels, Susan; Multiple insets by Paul Chesley (1997). The Story of Mothers & Daughters. HarperCollins. ISBN 0-00-225113-2.
- Underwood, Eleanor; Multiple insets by Paul Chesley (1999). The Life of a Geisha. Smithmark. ISBN 0-7651-1739-8.
- Johnson, Frederick; Cover photograph by Paul Chesley (2000). Goodhue County Minnesota. GCHS Press. ISBN 0-9617197-3-7.
- Tregaskis, Moana; Wayne Levin; Paul Chesley (2001). Hawaii. Compass American Guides. Fodor's. ISBN 1-878867-07-5.
- Breining, Greg; Paul Chesley (2005). Minnesota. Fodor's. ISBN 978-1-4000-1484-2.
- Mikal, Gilmore; Inset photograph by Paul Chesley (March 2005). "The Last Outlaw". Rolling Stone. p. 64.
- Fulcher, Scott; John Scott, Cover photograph by Paul Chesley (2007). Sociology Third Edition. Oxford University Press. ISBN 978-0-19-928500-6.
- Thorton, Jennifer; Inset photograph by Paul Chesley (2008). Visions of Paradise. National Geographic Society. pp. 238–239. ISBN 978-1-4262-0338-1.
- Sarhangi, Sheila; Paul Chesley (November 2009). "Liliha Moments". Honolulu. pp. 53–60.
- Chesley, Paul; Keith Lorenz (2013). Paul Chesley A Photographic Voyage. Geoff Books. ISBN 978-1939621047.
