= Tem Lukabu =

American football coach (born 1981)

Jacksonville Jaguars
- Title: Linebackers coach

Personal information
- Born: August 6, 1981 (age 45); Kinshasa, Democratic Republic of the Congo

Career information
- Position: Linebacker
- College: Colgate

Career history
- Rutgers (2006–2007) Director of player development; Rhode Island (2008-2009); Outside linebackers coach (2008); Linebackers coach (2009); Rutgers (2010–2011) Outside linebackers coach; Tampa Bay Buccaneers (2012–2013) Defensive assistant; Colgate (2014) Linebackers coach; FIU (2015) Defensive line coach; San Francisco 49ers (2016–2017) Defensive quality control coach; Mississippi State (2018) Linebackers coach; Cincinnati Bengals (2019) Linebackers coach; Boston College (2020–2022) Defensive coordinator; Carolina Panthers (2023–2024) Outside linebackers coach; Jacksonville Jaguars (2025–present) Linebackers coach

Tem Lukabu (born August 6, 1981) is an American football coach and former player currently serving as the linebackers coach for the Jacksonville Jaguars of the National Football League (NFL). Lukabu spent the 2019 season as the linebackers coach for Cincinnati Bengals. Lukabu served as a defensive assistant for the Tampa Bay Buccaneers of the NFL from 2012 to 2013 and has coached both linebackers and defensive line at the collegiate level, including stops at the University of Rhode Island, Rutgers University, Colgate University, Florida International University (FIU), and Mississippi State University.

== Early life and playing career ==
Lukabu was born in Kinshasa, Zaire.

Lukabu attended Colgate University, where he was a four-year letterman and three-year starter at linebacker. He helped the Raiders to a 31–7 overall record and 18–2 Patriot League mark. Colgate won back-to-back Patriot League championships and Lukabu was named the league's Defensive Player of the Year in 2002 and 2003. He was an All-Patriot League first team selection and All-Atlantic Region first team both seasons, and was named All-ECAC first team in 2003. Lukabu played on Colgate's 2003 team that went 15-1 and advanced to the NCAA Division I-AA national championship game. He served as team captain and was an Associated Press All-America third team performer at linebacker.

Lukabu received a bachelor of arts degree in history with a minor in political science from University in 2004.

== Coaching career ==
Prior to Mississippi State, Lukabu spent the 2016 and 2017 seasons as the defensive quality control coach with the San Francisco 49ers. The 2016 season Lukabu worked closely with the linebackers. In 2017, Lukabu assisted defensive backs coach Jeff Hafley, who guided a 49ers secondary that included standouts Eric Reid and Jimmie Ward.

In 2015, Lukabu served as the defensive line coach at Florida International. In 2014, he served as the outside linebackers coach at his alma mater, Colgate.

Lukabu spent two seasons (2012–13) as a defensive assistant for the Tampa Bay Buccaneers. In 2012, Lukabu assisted the Buccaneers defense, which ranked first for rushing defense in the NFL, after finishing the 2011 season last in the same category. During his time in Tampa Bay, he worked with defensive tackle Gerald McCoy, who was named to the first two Pro Bowls of his career and first-team All-Pro honors in both 2012 and 2013.

Following two seasons at Rutgers (2010–11), Lukabu joined Tampa Bay. At Rutgers, Lukabu coached outside linebackers under Greg Schiano. Lukabu began his coaching career working in player development at Rutgers between (2006-2008). In 2011, Lukabu coached Khaseem Greene, who earned conference Co-Defensive Player of the Year honors.

=== Boston College ===
Lukabu became Boston College's first Black coordinator when he joined new coach Jeff Hafley's staff in 2020.

=== Carolina Panthers ===
On February 19, 2023, the Carolina Panthers hired Lukabu as their outside linebackers coach. He was fired by the Panthers on January 8, 2025.

=== Jacksonville Jaguars ===
On February 2, 2025, Lukabu was hired by the Jacksonville Jaguars as the team's linebackers coach.
