= Auden Tate =

American football player (born 1997)

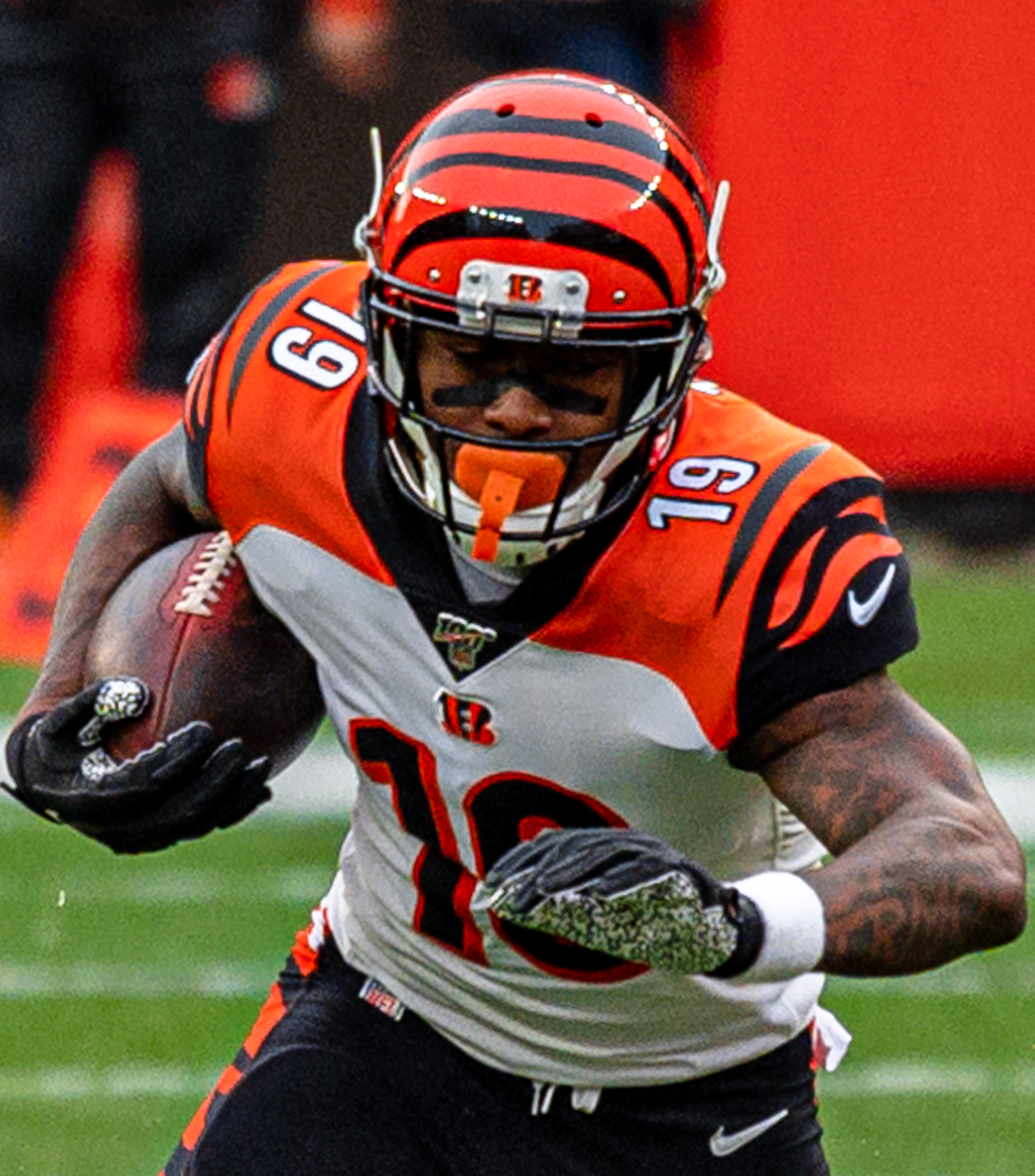
- Tate with the Cincinnati Bengals in 2019

Profile
- Position: Wide receiver

Personal information
- Born: February 3, 1997 (age 29); Irmo, South Carolina, U.S.
- Listed height: 6 ft 5 in (1.96 m)
- Listed weight: 228 lb (103 kg)

Career information
- High school: Wharton (Tampa, Florida)
- College: Florida State (2015–2017)
- NFL draft: 2018: 7th round, 253rd overall pick

Career history
- Cincinnati Bengals (2018–2021); Atlanta Falcons (2022)*; Philadelphia Eagles (2022)*; Arizona Cardinals (2022–2023)*; Calgary Stampeders (2024)*
- * Offseason or practice squad member only

Career NFL statistics
- Receptions: 61
- Receiving yards: 799
- Receiving touchdowns: 2
- Stats at Pro Football Reference

Auden Heanon Tate (born February 3, 1997) is an American professional football wide receiver. He played college football at Florida State, and was selected by the Cincinnati Bengals in the 2018 NFL draft.

== Early life ==
Tate attended Paul R. Wharton High School in Tampa, Florida. He committed to Florida State University to play college football.

== College career ==
Tate played at Florida State from 2015 to 2017. After his junior season in 2017, he decided to forgo his senior year and enter the 2018 NFL draft. He finished his career with 65 receptions for 957 yards and 16 touchdowns.

=== Statistics ===
Year	School	Conf	Class	Pos	G	Receiving			
Year	School	Conf	Class	Pos	G	Rec	Yds	Avg	TD
2016	Florida State	ACC	SO	WR	10	25	409	16.4	6
2017	Florida State	ACC	JR	WR	12	40	548	13.7	10
Career	Florida State				22	65	957	14.7	16

== Professional career ==
Pre-draft measurables
Height	Weight	Arm length	Hand span	Wingspan	40-yard dash	10-yard split	20-yard split	20-yard shuttle	Three-cone drill	Vertical jump	Broad jump
6 ft 4 7/8 in (1.95 m)	228 lb (103 kg)	33 3/4 in (0.86 m)	9 3/8 in (0.24 m)	6 ft 7 1/4 in (2.01 m)	4.66 s	1.60 s	2.73 s	4.58 s	7.37 s	31.0 in (0.79 m)	9 ft 4 in (2.84 m)
All values from NFL Combine/Pro Day

=== Cincinnati Bengals ===
Tate was drafted by the Cincinnati Bengals in the seventh round, 253rd overall, of the 2018 NFL draft. He was a healthy scratch for the first six games of the season before being waived on October 18, 2018, and re-signed to the practice squad. On November 5, he was promoted to the active roster. In Week 11, against the Baltimore Ravens, he made his first professional reception, a five-yard catch, in the 24–21 loss. He totaled four receptions for 35 receiving yards as a rookie.

In Week 5 of the 2019 season against the Arizona Cardinals, Tate caught three passes for 26 yards and his first career receiving touchdown in the 26–23 loss. In a Week 6 loss to the Baltimore Ravens, Tate caught five passes for a career high 91 yards. On December 10, 2019, he was placed on injured reserve with a knee injury. He finished the season as the Bengals second-leading receiver with 40 catches for 575 yards and one touchdown.

Tate was placed on the reserve/COVID-19 list by the team on November 25, 2020, and activated on November 28. On December 2, 2020, he was placed on injured reserve.

On December 4, 2021, Tate was placed on injured reserve with a calf injury.

=== Atlanta Falcons ===
On March 28, 2022, Tate signed with the Atlanta Falcons. He was released by the Falcons on August 23.

=== Philadelphia Eagles ===
On September 7, 2022, Tate was signed to the practice squad of the Philadelphia Eagles. On November 16, Tate was released from the Eagles' practice squad. He was re-signed to the practice squad the next day. Tate was released on December 13.

=== Arizona Cardinals ===
On January 4, 2023, Tate was signed to the Arizona Cardinals' practice squad. He signed a reserve/future contract with Arizona on January 11. He was released by the Cardinals on June 12.

=== Calgary Stampeders ===
On February 16, 2024, Tate signed with the Calgary Stampeders of the Canadian Football League (CFL). He was released on June 2.
