= Moishe Tokar =

Jewish anarchist assassin

Moishe Tokar (Yiddish: משה טאָקאַר; fl. 1905–1910) was a Jewish anarchist who attempted to assassinate the Russian general Sergei Gershelman.

== Anarchist activity ==
During the 1905 Russian Revolution, Tokar lived in Warsaw (then part of the Russian Empire) where he was a member of an anarchist collective of Jewish workers known as International. His daring in propaganda of the deed won him renown within the Russian anarchist movement. After escaping arrest by the police in Warsaw, he became a fugitive before being captured and imprisoned in the city's notorious Citadel prison. Possessing no identifying documents, he defied torture and managed to withhold his name from the authorities. In 1907 he escaped, fleeing first to Paris and then to London, where he became an associate of the revolutionary, Judith Goodman, and anarchist theorist, Rudolf Rocker.

Finding life in both cities too tame, he returned from London to Paris with the intention of returning to Russia. In Paris he met a group of similarly disposed young Russian illegalists, with whom he planned to rob a Parisian bank, but the group were betrayed by one of their own and arrested. Under the influence of Prime Minister Clemenceau, who was sympathetic to their youthful idealism and unaware of their criminal intent, the group were not imprisoned but rather were ordered to leave Paris on the next train.

Tokar returned to London, where he remained for nearly a year before informing his colleagues that he was unable to tolerate it any longer and would risk traveling to Russia, whatever the consequences.

== Assassination attempt and death ==
In January 1909 he finally returned to his native country, settling in Łódź. There he read reports of the cruel torture of political prisoners in Vilnius and resolved to assassinate Sergei Gershelman, the military commander responsible. Tokar went to Vilnius where, on 6 December 1909, he shot at Gershelman as the latter drove his carriage through the street. Though Gershelman was uninjured, Tokar's shots wounded General Fenga, who had accompanied Gershelman in the carriage.

Tokar was sentenced to death for the crime on 13 January 1910. In his cell a couple of days before he was to be executed, Moishe Tokar doused himself in paraffin from his lamp and burned himself alive.

== See also ==
- Anarchism and violence
- List of Jewish anarchists
