= Moses ka Moyo =

South African reporter (1977–2018)

Moses Moyo (19 November 1977 – 25 October 2018) was a reporter, editor and activist in South Africa.

== Biography ==
Moyo was the founder and chairperson of Friends of the Inner-city Forum, a community-based organisation in the inner city of Johannesburg. He was also a founding director of Ekuphumuleni hospice. He played an important role in the creation of Tirisano Inner-city Housing Co-operative (an initiative to help people buy flats in the inner-city of Johannesburg on a rent to buy basis).

He was a reporter with Eyewitness News.

Moyo was a pro-Israel activist and raised money by offering to run in the Jerusalem Marathon for the DL link, a cancer survivor organisation.

Moyo was the deputy President of the Association of Independent Publishers.
