= Anthony Chesley =

American football player (born 1996)

Profile
- Position: Cornerback

Personal information
- Born: May 31, 1996 (age 30); Temple Hills, Maryland, U.S.
- Listed height: 6 ft 0 in (1.83 m)
- Listed weight: 190 lb (86 kg)

Career information
- High school: Gywnn Park
- College: Coastal Carolina (2014–2018)
- NFL draft: 2019: undrafted

Career history
- Cincinnati Bengals (2019)*; Houston Texans (2019–2020); Indianapolis Colts (2021); Tampa Bay Buccaneers (2022)
- * Offseason or practice squad member only

Career NFL statistics
- Total tackles: 9
- Fumble recoveries: 1
- Stats at Pro Football Reference

Anthony Chesley (born May 31, 1996) is an American professional football cornerback. He played college football at Coastal Carolina.

== College career ==
Chesley played college football at Coastal Carolina from 2014 to 2018.

== Professional career ==
Pre-draft measurables
Height	Weight	Arm length	Hand span	40-yard dash	10-yard split	20-yard split	20-yard shuttle	Three-cone drill	Vertical jump	Broad jump
5 ft 11 5/8 in (1.82 m)	188 lb (85 kg)	31 1/4 in (0.79 m)	8 in (0.20 m)	4.46 s	1.59 s	2.59 s	4.24 s	7.00 s	35.5 in (0.90 m)	10 ft 0 in (3.05 m)
All values from Pro Day

=== Cincinnati Bengals ===
Chesley signed with the Cincinnati Bengals as an undrafted free agent on May 10, 2019. He was waived during final roster cuts on August 31, 2019, and signed to the practice squad the next day. He was released on October 24, 2019.

=== Houston Texans ===
Chesley signed with the Houston Texans' practice squad on October 29, 2019. He signed a reserve/future contract with the team following the season on January 13, 2020. He was waived during final roster cuts on September 5, 2020, and re-signed to the practice squad two days later. Chesley was elevated to the active roster on December 12, December 19, and December 27 for the team's weeks 14, 15, and 16 games against the Chicago Bears, Indianapolis Colts, and Cincinnati Bengals, and reverted to the practice squad after each game. His practice squad contract with the team expired after the season on January 11, 2021.

=== Indianapolis Colts ===
On January 12, 2021, Chesley signed a reserve/futures contract with the Indianapolis Colts. He was waived on August 31, 2021, and re-signed to the practice squad the next day. He was promoted to the active roster on September 29, 2021. He was waived on November 20 and re-signed to the practice squad. He signed a reserve/future contract on January 10, 2022.

On August 30, 2022, Chesley was waived by the Colts.

=== Tampa Bay Buccaneers ===
On September 1, 2022, Chesley was signed to the Tampa Bay Buccaneers practice squad. He was promoted to the active roster on December 14. On January 10, 2023, Chesley was placed on injured reserve after aggravating a hamstring injury in the season finale against the Atlanta Falcons.

Chesley was waived as part of final roster cuts on August 28, 2023.
