= Moses Chesley =

American politician

Moses Chesley was an American politician from Maine. Chesley, a Greenback from Oxford, Maine, served one term in the Maine House of Representatives (1880). He was one of eight state representatives in 1880 from Oxford County.
