= Brad Kragthorpe =

American football coach (born 1992)

Cincinnati Bengals
- Title: Quarterbacks coach

Personal information
- Born: March 2, 1992 (age 34); Flagstaff, Arizona, U.S.
- Listed height: 6 ft 0 in (1.83 m)
- Listed weight: 202 lb (92 kg)

Career information
- Position: Quarterback
- High school: Trinity (KY); Holland (OK)
- College: Idaho State (2011); LSU (2012–2015)

Career history
- Utah State (2016–2017) Graduate assistant; LSU (2018) Offensive analyst; Cincinnati Bengals (2019–2020) Offensive assistant; Cincinnati Bengals (2021–2022) Assistant wide receivers coach; Cincinnati Bengals (2023) Assistant quarterbacks coach; Cincinnati Bengals (2024–present) Quarterbacks coach

Brad Kragthorpe (born March 2, 1992) is an American football coach who is the quarterbacks coach for the Cincinnati Bengals of the National Football League (NFL). He played college football for the Idaho State Bengals and LSU Tigers and has previously coached at Utah State and LSU.

== Early life ==
Kragthorpe was born on March 2, 1992, in Flagstaff, Arizona. He attended Trinity High School in Louisville, Kentucky. He then transferred to Holland Hall Preparatory School in Tulsa, Oklahoma for his senior year in 2010, being a top quarterback in the state. He led the team to a 10–1 record while throwing for 1,738 yards and 28 touchdowns, later committing to play college football for the Idaho State Bengals.

Kragthorpe redshirted as a true freshman at Idaho State in 2011. He got to play in the team's spring game, known as the "Dave Kragthorpe Classic" in honor of his grandfather, in 2012, completing 12-of-17 passes for 85 yards and a touchdown. Prior to the 2012 season, he transferred to as a walk-on to the LSU Tigers where his father was coaching, sitting out the year due to then-current NCAA transfer rules. He was a backup quarterback and the team's backup holder during the 2013 season, seeing no playing time. He then served as the starting holder in the 2014 and 2015 seasons, gaining notice for a fake field goal where he lateraled for an 18-yard touchdown. Kragthorpe played in 25 games in his collegiate career and graduated with a business degree; his only time at quarterback came in a 2014 game when he completed his only pass for an 11-yard touchdown.

== Coaching career ==
=== Utah State ===
Kragthorpe began his coaching career as a graduate assistant for the Utah State Aggies, serving in the position from 2016 to 2017.

=== LSU ===
In 2018, Kragthorpe then served as an offensive analyst for his alma mater, LSU.

=== Cincinnati Bengals ===
In 2019, Kragthorpe was hired by the Cincinnati Bengals as an offensive assistant under head coach Zac Taylor. Kragthorpe served two years in the position before being promoted to assistant wide receivers coach in 2021; two seasons later, he became the assistant quarterbacks coach. He was the quarterbacks coach at the 2024 East–West Shrine Bowl.

On February 8, 2024, Kragthorpe was promoted to quarterbacks coach.

== Personal life ==
Kragthorpe is the son of football coach Steve Kragthorpe and the grandson of football coach Dave Kragthorpe.
