= Global spread of the printing press =

Spread of printing in Europe in the 15th century

Output of printed books in Europe between the 15th and 18th centuries

Following the invention of the printing press in the German city of Mainz by Johannes Gutenberg c. 1439, Western printing technology spread across the world, and was adopted worldwide by the end of the 19th century. The technology, which mechanized the process of printing with moveable type, displaced the manuscript and block printing.

In the Western world, the operation of a press became synonymous with the enterprise of publishing and lent its name to a new branch of media, the "press" (see List of the oldest newspapers).

== Spread of Gutenberg's press ==
=== Germany ===
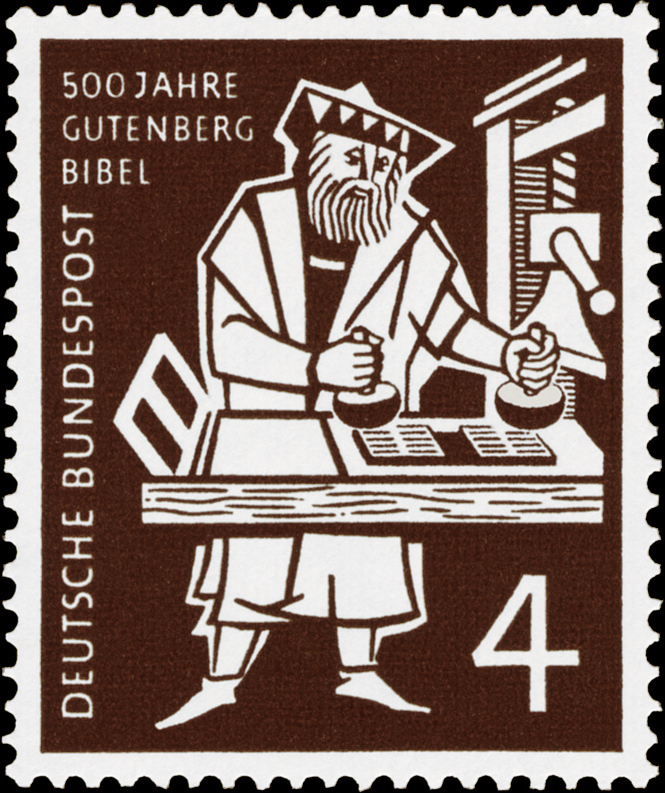
Modern stamp commemorating the Gutenberg Bible, the first major European work printed by mechanical movable type

Gutenberg's first major print work was the 42-line Bible in Latin, probably printed between 1452 and 1454 in the German city of Mainz. After Gutenberg lost a lawsuit against his investor, Johann Fust, Fust put Gutenberg's employee Peter Schöffer in charge of the print shop. Thereupon Gutenberg established a new one with the financial backing of another money lender. With Gutenberg's monopoly revoked, and the technology no longer secret, printing spread throughout Germany and beyond, diffused first by emigrating German printers, but soon also by foreign apprentices.

=== Europe ===
In rapid succession, printing presses were set up in Central and Western Europe. Major towns, in particular, functioned as centers of diffusion (Cologne 1466, Rome 1467, Venice 1469, Paris 1470, Buda 1473, Kraków 1473, London 1477). In 1481, barely 30 years after the publication of the 42-line Bible, the small Netherlands already featured printing shops in 21 cities and towns, while Italy and Germany each had shops in about 40 towns at that time. According to one estimate, "by 1500, 220 printing presses were in operation throughout Western Europe and had produced 8 million books" and during the 1550s there were "three hundred or more" printers and booksellers in Geneva alone. The output was in the order of twenty million volumes and rose in the sixteenth century tenfold to between 150 and 200 million copies. Germany and Italy were considered the two main centres of printing in terms of quantity and quality.

=== Rest of the world ===
The near-simultaneous discovery of sea routes to the West (Christopher Columbus, 1492) and East (Vasco da Gama, 1498) and the subsequent establishment of trade links greatly facilitated the global spread of Gutenberg-style printing. Traders, colonists, but perhaps most importantly, missionaries exported printing presses to the new European oversea domains, setting up new print shops and distributing printing material. In the Americas, the first extra-European print shop was founded in Mexico City in 1544 (or 1539), and soon after Jesuits started operating the first printing press in Asia (Goa, 1556).

According to Suraiya Faroqhi, lack of interest and religious reasons were among the reasons for the slow adoption of the printing press outside Europe: Thus, printing in the Arabic script, after encountering strong opposition by Muslim legal scholars and manuscript scribes, remained formally or informally prohibited in the Ottoman Empire between 1483 and 1729, according to some sources even on penalty of death, while some movable Arabic type printing was done by Pope Julius II (1503−1512) for distribution among Middle Eastern Christians, and the oldest Quran printed with movable type was produced in Venice in 1537/1538 for the Ottoman market.

Hebrew texts and presses were imported across the Middle East – as early as 1493 – Constantinople, Fez (1516), Cairo (1557) and Safed (1577). Disquiet among Muslims regarding the publication of religious texts in this way may have dampened down their production. In 1831, Israel Bak brought a Hebrew printing press from his family business in Berdichev, Ukraine to Safed and Jerusalem, and began printing the first Hebrew texts in the land of Israel in more than 250 years.

In India, reports are that Jesuits "presented a polyglot Bible to the Emperor Akbar in 1580 but did not succeed in arousing much curiosity." But also practical reasons seem to have played a role. The English East India Company, for example, brought a printer to Surat in 1675, but was not able to cast type in Indian scripts, so the venture failed.

North America saw the adoption by the Cherokee Indian Elias Boudinot who published the tribe's first newspaper, the Cherokee Phoenix, from 1828, partly in the Cherokee language, using the Cherokee script recently invented by his compatriot Sequoyah.

In the 19th century, the arrival of the Gutenberg-style press to the shores of Tahiti (1818), Hawaii (1821) and other Pacific islands, marked the end of a global diffusion process which had begun almost 400 years earlier. At the same time, the "old style" press (as the Gutenberg model came to be termed in the 19th century), was already in the process of being displaced by industrial machines like the steam powered press (1812) and the rotary press (1833), which radically departed from Gutenberg's design, but were still of the same development line.

== Dates by location ==
The following represents a selection:

=== Germany, Austria and German printers in Central Europe ===
Date	City	Printer	Comment
1452–1453	Mainz	Johannes Gutenberg, Peter Schöffer, Johann Fust (investor)	Gutenberg Bible
c. 1457	Bamberg	Albrecht Pfister, Johann Sensenschmid (from 1480)	Pfister: first woodcut book illustration c. 1461
1460	Strassburg	Johannes Mentelin, Johann Grüninger (1482)	In 1605, Johann Carolus publishes the German Relation aller Fuernemmen und gedenckwuerdigen Historien (Collection of all distinguished and commemorable news), recognized by the World Association of Newspapers as the first newspaper.
c. 1465	Cologne	Ulrich Zell, Busaus, Gymnici, Mylij, Quentell	
1468	Augsburg	Günther Zainer	
Not later than 1469	Nuremberg	Johann Sensenschmidt, Johannes Regiomontanus (1472–1475), Anton Koberger (1473–1513)Johann Endter (1625–1670)	Nuremberg Chronicle
c. 1471	Speyer		
c. 1472	Lauingen		
1473	Esslingen am Neckar		
1473	Merseburg		
1473	Ulm		
c. 1473–1474	Erfurt		
c. 1474	Lübeck		1488, Missale Aboense and other versions, first books for the Scandinavian and Finnish markets, by Bartholomeus Ghotan
1475	Breslau (now Wrocław)	Kasper Elyan of Glogau	Kasper's print shop remained operational until 1483 with an overall output of 11 titles.
1475	Trento		
c. 1475	Blaubeuren		
c. 1475	Rostock		
1476	Reutlingen		
c. 1478–1479	Memmingen	Albrecht Kunne	
1479	Würzburg	Georg Reyser	
1479	Magdeburg		
1480	Passau		
1480	Leipzig	Konrad Kachelofen, Andreas Friesner	
c. 1480	Eichstätt		
1482	Vienna	Johann Winterburger	
1482	Munich	Johann Schauer	
c. 1482	Heidelberg		
1484	Ingolstadt		
1485	Münster		
c. 1485	Regensburg		
1486	Schleswig	Stephan Arndes	
c. 1486	Stuttgart		
c. 1488	Hamburg		
1489	Hagenau		
1491	Freiburg		
1492	Marienburg	Jakob Karweyse	Only two editions printed

=== Rest of Europe ===
==== Italy ====
Date	City	Printer	Comment
1465	Subiaco	Arnold Pannartz, Konrad Sweynheym	
1467	Rome	Ulrich Han, Arnold Pannartz, Konrad Sweynheym (from 1467)	
1469	Venice	Johann von Speyer, shortly afterwards Nikolaus Jenson from Tours, Aldus Manutius	Johann was granted a privilege for 5 years for movable type printing by the Senate, but died soon after. In 1501, Ottaviano Petrucci produced the first book of sheet music printed from movable type.
1470	Milan	Filippo de Lavagna, Antonio Zaroto, shortly afterwards Waldarfer von Regensburg	
1470	Naples		
1471	Florence	Demetrius Damilas	Earliest printing in Greek
1471	Genoa		
1471	Ferrara		
1471	Bologna		Probably in 1477, claimed to have the first engraved illustrations, although the 1476 Boccaccio edition by Colard Mansion in Bruges already had copper engravings
1471	Padua		
1471	Treviso		
1472	Parma		
1473	Pavia		
1473	Brescia		
c. 1473–1474	Modena		
1483	Soncino	Israel Nathan ben Samuel and Soncino Family	
1484	Siena		

In the 15th century, printing presses were established in 77 Italian cities and towns. At the end of the following century, 151 locations in Italy had seen at one time printing activities, of which 130 (86%) were north of Rome. During these two centuries a total of 2894 printers were active in Italy, with only 216 of them located in southern Italy. Around 60% of the Italian printing shops were situated in six cities (Venice, Rome, Milan, Naples, Bologna and Florence), with the concentration of printers in Venice being particularly high (approximately 30%).

==== Switzerland ====
Date	City	Printer	Comment
c. 1468	Basel	Berthold Ruppel	
1470	Beromünster	Helias Helye	
c. 1474	Burgdorf		
1478	Geneva	Adam Steinschaber	
c. 1479	Zürich		
1577	Schaffhausen		
1577	St. Gallen		
1585	Fribourg		
1664	Einsiedeln		

==== France ====
Date	City	Printer	Comment
1470	Paris	Ulrich Gering, Martin Crantz, Michael Friburger	
1473	Lyon	Guillaume Le Roy, Buyer	
c. 1475	Toulouse		
1476–1477	Angers		
c. 1477–1478	Vienne		
1478–1479	Chablis		
1479	Poitiers		
1480	Caen		
1480–1482	Rouen		
1483	Troyes		
1484–1485	Rennes		
1486	Abbeville		
c. 1486–1488	Besançon		
1490–1491	Orléans		
1491	Dijon		
1491	Angoulême		
1493	Nantes		
1493–1494	Tours		
1495–1496	Limoges		
1497	Avignon		
1500	Perpignan		

Apart from the cities above, a small number of lesser towns also set up printing presses.

==== Spain ====
Date	City	Printer	Comment
1471–1472	Segovia	Johannes Parix	
c. 1472–1474	Seville		
c. 1472–1473	Barcelona	Heinrich Botel, Georgius vom Holtz, Johannes Planck	
c. 1472–1473	Valencia	Lambert Palmart, Jakob Vinzlant	
1475	Zaragoza	Matthias Flander, Paul Hurus	
c. 1480	Salamanca		
1485	Burgos		
1486	Toledo		
1496	Granada	Meinrad Ungut, Hans Pegnitzer	
1499	Montserrat		Oldest publishing house in the world still running
1500	Madrid		

==== Belgium ====
Date	City	Printer	Comment
1473	Aalst	Dirk Martens	
1473–1474	Leuven	Johann von Westphalen	
c. 1473–1474	Bruges	Colard Mansion	Worked with, and (?) trained William Caxton, printing the first books in English (Recuyell of the Historyes of Troye) and also French, as well as the first book to use engravings for illustrations.
1475–1476	Brussels		
1480	Oudenaarde	Arend De Keysere	
1481	Antwerp	Matt. Van der Goes	
1483	Ghent	Arend De Keysere	

==== Netherlands ====
Date	City	Printer	Comment
1473	Utrecht		
1477	Gouda	Gerard Leeu	
1477	Deventer	Richard Paffroad	
1477	Zwolle		
1477	Delft	Jacob Jacobzoon	
1483	Haarlem	Jacob Bellaert	

In 1481, printing was already being done in 21 towns and cities.

==== Hungary ====
Date	City	Printer	Comment
1472	Buda (now Budapest)	Andreas Hess	The first work printed on Hungarian soil was the Latin history book Chronica Hungarorum published on 5 June 1472.

In the 16th century, a total of 20 print shops were active in 30 different places in Hungary, as some of them were moving several times due to political instability.

==== Poland ====
Date	City	Printer	Comment
1473	Kraków	Kasper Straube	The oldest printed work in Poland is the Latin Calendarium cracoviense (Cracovian Calendar), a single-sheet astronomical almanac for the year 1474. Although Straube continued to published in Kraków until 1477, printing became permanently established in Kraków, and Poland, only after 1503. In 1491, the first book in Cyrillic script was published by Schweipolt Fiol from Franconia. In 1513, Florian Ungler printed Hortulus Animae, the first book in the Polish language.
1499	Danzig	Franz Rhode	1538: Wisby'sches Waterrecht, 1540: Narratio Prima
1580	Warsaw		
1593	Lwów	Matthias Bernhart	

In the 15th and 16th centuries, printing presses were also established in Poznań, Lwów, Brześć Litewski and Vilnius.

==== Czech Republic ====
Date	City	Printer	Comment
c. 1475–1476	Plzeň	Mikuláš Bakalář (name known since 1488)	Statuta Ernesti (1476, Latin), The New Testament (1476, two editions in Czech), Passionale, The Chronicle of Troy (c. 1476, Czech)
1486	Brno	Conradus Stahel, Matthias Preinlein	Agenda Olomucensis 1486 and further 20, partly small prints in Latin until 1488.
1487	Prague		The Chronicle of Troy 1487, Psalter 1487, The Bible 1488 (all in Czech); since 1512 printing in Hebrew, since 1517 in Cyrillic, too.
1489	Kutná Hora	Martin z Tišnova	The Bible (in Czech)

==== England ====
Date	City	Printer	Comment
1476	Westminster	William Caxton	The first dated prints in England are an indulgence dating to 13 December 1476 (date written in by hand), and the Dicts or Sayings, completed on 18 November 1477. Between 1472 and 1476, Caxton had already published several English works on the continent (see Bruges above).
1478	Oxford	Theoderic Rood	
c. 1479	St Albans	'Schoolmaster'; John Haule	The St Albans Press produced eight known prints including The Chronicles of England.
1480	London	John Lettou, William Machlinia, Wynkyn de Worde	

==== Denmark ====
Date	City	Printer	Comment
1482	Odense	Johann Snell	Snell was the first to introduce printing both in Denmark and Sweden.
1493	Copenhagen	Gottfried von Ghemen	Von Ghemen published in Copenhagen from 1493 to 1495 and from 1505 to 1510. In the meantime, he was active in the Dutch town of Leiden. For 200 years, official policy confined printing in Denmark largely to Copenhagen.

==== Sweden ====
Date	City	Printer	Comment
1483	Stockholm	Johann Snell	Snell published the Dialogus creaturarum on Riddarholmen island in Stockholm on December 20, 1483.
Before 1495	Vadstena		
1510	Uppsala		

==== Portugal ====
Date	City	Printer	Comment
1487	Faro	Samuel Gacon (also called Porteiro)	The country's first printed book was the Hebrew Pentateuch, the Faro Pentateuch published by the Jew Samuel Gacon in southern Portugal, after having fled from the Spanish Inquisition.
1488	Chaves	Unknown	According to the German scholar Horch the Sacramental is the first book printed in Portuguese, and not Ludolphus de Saxonia's Livro de Vita Christi of 1495 as previously assumed.
1489	Lisbon	Rabbi Zorba, Raban Eliezer	Eliezer Toledano's Hebrew press was active with his foreman Judah Gedalia from 1489 until the expulsion in 1497
1492	Leiria		
1494	Braga		
1536	Coimbra		
1571	Viseu		
1583	Angra do Heroísmo, Azores		
1622	Porto		

==== Croatia ====
Date	City	Printer	Comment
1483	Kosinj, Lika		The Printing house of Kosinj is known for producing the Missale Romanum Glagolitice on February 22nd 1483. The Croatian text known as "Misal po zakonu rimskoga dvora" was significant as it is the first missal in Europe which was not printed in Latin script; only 28 years after the Gutenberg Bible.
1494	Senj	Blaž Baromić	Blaž Baromić with his co-workers established printing house in Senj based on glagolitic script. Their first work was the Breviary of Senj.
1530	Rijeka	Šimun Kožičić Benja	

==== Serbia, Montenegro and Bosnia and Herzegovina ====
Date	City	Printer	Comment
1493	Cetinje	Makarije	Đurađ Crnojević used the printing press brought to Cetinje by his father Ivan Crnojević to print the first books in southeastern Europe, in 1493. The Crnojević printing house operated from 1493 through 1496, turning out religious books of which five have been preserved: Oktoih prvoglasnik, Oktoih petoglasnik, Psaltir, Molitvenik and Četvorojevanđelje (the first Bible in Serbian language). Đurađ managed the printing of the books, wrote prefaces and afterwords, and developed sophisticated tables of Psalms with the lunar calendar. The books from the Crnojević press were printed in two colors, red and black, and were richly ornamented. They served as models for many of the subsequent books printed in Cyrillic.
1519	Church of St. George, Sopotnica near Novo Goražde	Božidar Goraždanin	Srbulja of the Goražde printing house
1537	monastery of Saint George near Užice	hieromonk Teodosije	Srbulja of the Rujno Monastery printing house
1544	Mileševa monastery near Prijepolje	Hieromonk Mardarije, Hegumen Danilo	Srbulja of the Mileševa printing house
1552	Belgrade	Trojan Gundulić, Hieromonk Mardarije	Srbulja of the Belgrade printing house
1562	monastery of Mrkšina crkva near Kosjerić	Hieromonk Mardarije	Srbulja of the Mrkšina crkva printing house

By 1500, the cut-off point for incunabula, 236 towns in Europe had presses, and it is estimated that twenty million books had been printed for a European population of perhaps seventy million.

==== Scotland ====
Date	City	Printer	Comment
1507 (the earliest surviving item is dated 4 April 1508)	Edinburgh	Walter Chepman and Androw Myllar	William Elphinstone, the Bishop of Aberdeen, was anxious to get a breviary published (see Aberdeen Breviary), and petitioned King James IV to have a printing press set up. Myllar had previously been involved with printing in France, where Scots authors had traditionally had their books printed (see Auld Alliance). The earliest works were mainly small books (approximately 15 cm), but at least one book was printed in folio format, Blind Harry's The Wallace.
1552	St Andrews	John Scot	
1571	Stirling	Robert Lekprevik	
1622	Aberdeen	Edward Raban	
1638	Glasgow	George Anderson	
1651	Leith	Evan Tyler	
1685	Campbeltown	unknown printer	
1694	Maybole	unknown printer	

==== Romania ====
Date	City	Printer	Comment
1508	Târgoviște	Hieromonk Makarije	Macarie is brought into Wallachia by the prince Radu cel Mare. The first printed book in Romania is made in 1508, Liturghierul. Octoihul is also printed in 1510, and Evangheliarul is printed in 1512
1534	Brașov	Johannes Honterus	At the time, the city was a part of the Eastern Hungarian Kingdom.
1545	Târgoviște	Dimitrije Ljubavić	Mostly religious books are printed, among them being Molitvenik. Books printed in Wallachia were also reprinted for use in Moldavia, which at the time did not have its own press.
1550	Klausenburg (Cluj-Napoca)		At the time, the city was a part of the Eastern Hungarian Kingdom.
1561	Brașov	Coresi	Întrebare creştinească (Catehismul)

==== Greece ====
Date	City	Printer	Comment
1515	Saloniki		
1817	Corfu		

==== Lithuania and Belarus ====
Date	City	Printer	Comment
1522	Vilnius	Francysk Skaryna	The Little Traveller’s Book
1553	Brest	Bernard Wojewódka	Catechism

==== Iceland ====
Date	City	Printer	Comment
c. 1530	Holar	Jon Matthiasson (Swede)	Press imported on the initiative of Bishop Jon Arason. First known local print is the Latin songbook Breviarium Holense of 1534.

==== Norway ====
Date	City	Printer	Comment
mid-16th century	Trondheim		
1644	Oslo		

==== Ireland ====
Date	City	Printer	Comment
1551	Dublin	Humphrey Powell	The first book printed was the Book of Common Prayer.

==== Russia ====
Date	City	Printer	Comment
1553−1554	Moscow	Unknown	According to recent research, the Gospel Book and six others published then.
1564	Moscow	Ivan Fyodorov (printer)	Acts of the Apostles (Apostol) is the first dated book printed in Russia.
1711	Saint Petersburg		
1815	Astrakhan		

Until the reign of Peter the Great printing in Russia remained confined to the print office established by Fedorov in Moscow. In the 18th century, annual printing output gradually rose from 147 titles in 1724 to 435 (1787), but remained constrained by state censorship and widespread illiteracy.

==== Latvia ====
Date	City	Printer	Comment
1588	Riga	Nikolaus Mollin	

==== Ukraine ====
Date	City	Printer	Comment
1574	Lviv	Ivan Fedorov	Apostol (the Acts and Epistles in Slavonic)
1593	Lviv		

==== Wales ====
Date	City	Printer	Comment
1587	Llandudno	Roger Thackwell	Y Drych Cristianogawl ("The Christian Mirror"). Printed covertly in a cave on the Little Orme.

==== Estonia ====
Date	City	Printer	Comment
1632	Tartu	Jacobus Pistorius (Jacob Becker)	PostOrdnung (28 September 1632) was the first document printed in Tartu with date and printer's name. The printing press operated in connection with Tartu University (Academia Gustaviana) that was opened on the same year. The reverse side of the document contains a resolution of Johan Skytte about Academia Gustaviana.

==== Finland ====
Date	City	Printer	Comment
1642	Turku	Peder Walde, Swedish	The print shop was set up at The Royal Academy of Turku which was the first university (created in 1640) in what is now Finland.

==== Georgia ====
Date	City	Printer	Comment
1709	Tbilisi	Mihail Ishtvanovitch	Established by the decree of Vakhtang VI in Abanotubani, Tbilisi

The first books printed in Georgian were Alphabetum Ibericum sive Georgianum cum Oratione and Dittionario giorgiano e italiano published in Rome in 1629.

==== Armenia ====
Date	City	Printer	Comment
1771	Vagharshapat	St. Grigor Lusavorich, Simeon Yerevantsi (Catholicos of Armenia)	The first published book in Etchmiadzin was titled Սաղմոսարան (Psalms). The printing house was St. Grigor Lusavorich.

The first book which had Armenian letters was published in Mainz in 1486. The first Armenian book to be published by the printing press was Urbatagirq—Book of Friday prayers—which was published by Hakob Meghapart in Venice in 1512.

==== Greenland ====
Date	City	Printer	Comment
1860	Godthaab		

=== Latin America ===
==== Mexico ====
Date	City	Printer	Comment
1539	Mexico City	Juan Pablos of Brescia at the House of the First Print Shop in the Americas	Established by the archbishop Juan de Zumárraga, using Hans Cromberger from Seville, the first book printed was Breve y Mas Compendiosa Doctrina Christina, written in both Spanish and native Nahuatl. Esteban Martín of Mexico City has been determined to be the first printer in the Western Hemisphere. Between 1539 and 1600 presses produced 300 editions, and in the following century 2,007 editions were printed. In the 16th century, more than 31% of locally produced imprints were in native Indian languages, mostly religious texts and grammars or vocabularies of Amerindian languages. In the 17th century, this rate dropped to 3% of total output.
1640	Puebla		

==== Peru ====
Date	City	Printer	Comment
1581	Lima	Antonio Ricardo	Presses produced 1,106 titles between 1584 and 1699.

==== Guatemala ====
Date	City	Printer	Comment
1660	Guatemala City		The first book is Un tratado sobre el cultivo del añil, which, not coincidentally, was printed in blue ink.

==== Paraguay ====
Date	City	Printer	Comment
1700	Jesuit mission of Paraguay		Established with local materials by local Guaraní workers who had converted to Christianity.

==== Cuba ====
Date	City	Printer	Comment
1707	Havana		

==== Colombia ====
Date	City	Printer	Comment
1736	Bogotá		

==== Ecuador ====
Date	City	Printer	Comment
1759	Quito		

==== Chile ====
Date	City	Printer	Comment
1776	Santiago		Press functioned only briefly. In 1812 permanently established.
1810	Valparaíso		

==== Argentina ====
Date	City	Printer	Comment
1780	Buenos Aires		

==== Puerto Rico ====
Date	City	Printer	Comment
1806			

==== Uruguay ====
Date	City	Printer	Comment
1807	Montevideo		

==== Brazil ====
Date	City	Printer	Comment
1808	Rio de Janeiro		

==== Venezuela ====
Date	City	Printer	Comment
1808	Caracas		

=== Africa ===
Date	City	Country	Printer	Comment
1516	Fez	Morocco	Jewish	Refugees who had worked for the printer Rabbi Eliezer Toledano in Lisbon
1557	Cairo	Egypt	Gershom ben Eliezer Soncino	First printing press in the Middle East, known only from two fragments discovered in the Cairo Geniza.
As early as the 16th century		Mozambique	Portuguese	
	Luanda	Angola	Portuguese	
	Malindi	Kenya	Portuguese	
1795	Cape Town	South Africa	Johann Christian Ritter; German	Almanach voor't jaar 1796. The possibility of printing may be as early as 1784 when Ritter arrived in the Cape but no earlier output has surfaced. Ritter is also said to have printed Almanacs for 1795 to 1797 suggesting a start to printing of 1794.
1798	Cairo	Egypt	French	
c. 1825		Madagascar	English	Malagasy translation of the Assembly's Shorter Catechism
1831	Grahamstown	South Africa		Grahamstown Journal
1833		Mauritius		
1841	Pietermaritzburg	South Africa		Ivangeli e li yincucli, e li baliweyo G'Umatu
1841	Umlazi	South Africa		Incuadi yokuqala yabafundayo
1856	Bloemfontein	South Africa		Orange Vrystaad A.B.C. spel en leesboek
1855	Scheppmansdorf (now: Rooibank)	Namibia	Franz Heinrich Kleinschmidt	On 29 June 1855, Protestant missionary Kleinschmidt published 300 copies of Luther's catechism in the Nama language which represent the first printed works in that tongue. Political unrest seems to have prevented further printing activities. The press was reported as being functional as late as 1868, but whether printing was resumed is unknown.
1863	Massawa	Eritrea	Lorenzo Biancheri	An Italian Lazarist missionary set up the first printing press in Ethiopia to print missionary texts in Amharic. Biancheri called himself "Printer to His Majesty Emperor Theodros", but there is no evidence he had an imperial appointment. He died in 1864 and his press did not outlive him.
1870s		Malawi		
1892	Salisbury	Southern Rhodesia (now: Zimbabwe)		Rhodesia Herald in print, may have started earlier
1901	Harar	Ethiopia		Fifth press in the Ethiopian Empire, but the first in what is today Ethiopia. Established by Franciscans, it printed periodicals in French and Amharic. It was later moved to Dire Dawa.

=== Asia ===
==== South Asia ====
Date	City	Country	Printer	Comment
1556	Goa	Portuguese India	Jesuits	The press was attached to St Paul's college. See Printing in Goa.
1674–1675	Bombay	British India	Bhimjee Parikh / Henry Hills	East India Company supplied press, with only a Latin typeface
1712	Tranquebar	Danish India	Danish-Halle/SPCK Mission	
1736	Colombo	Ceylon, Dutch India	Dutch reform Church / Dutch East India Company	Printing in Dutch, Sinhala, and Tamil
1758	Pondicherry	French India	Thomas Arthur, comte de Lally	Captured by the East India Company, and moved to Madras in 1761
1761	Madras	British India	Johann Phillip Fabricius	Printing in Tamil, using the captured Pondicherry press
1772	Madras	British India	Shahamir Shahamirian, Armenian	The first book published here was Այբբենարան (Aybbenaran – Reading Primer) in Armenian.
1777, November	Calcutta	British India	James Augustus Hicky	Publisher of Hicky's Bengal Gazette
1778, January	Calcutta	British India	Robert William Kiernander and John Zachariah Kiernander	SPCK Missionaries
Between 1777 and 1779	Hooghly	British India	Charles Wilkins and Nathaniel Brassey Halhed	
1780, November	Calcutta	British India	Barnard Messink and Peter Reed	Publishers of the India Gazette
1792	Bombay	British India		
1800	Serampore	Danish India	Baptist Missionary Society	Printing Bibles and books in several Indian languages
1848	Lahore	British India	Syed Muhammad Azeem	Lahore Chronicle Press, located in the old Naulakha palace, and printing in English and Farsi (Persian)

==== Ottoman Empire ====
Date	City	Printer	Comment
Dec 13th, 1493	Constantinople	David and Samuel ibn Nahmias, Hebrew	First ever printed book in Ottoman Empire was Arba'ah Turim in Hebrew. Some argue the year and suggest 1503 or 1504.
1519–1523	the Church of Saint George in Sopotnica, Sanjak of Herzegovina, Ottoman Empire (today village in Novo Goražde, Republic of Srpska, Bosnia and Herzegovina). The books were printed in Church Slavonic of the Serbian recension.	Božidar Goraždanin	hieratikon (1519), psalter (1521) and a small euchologion (1523)
1554	Bursa		
1567	Constantinople	Apkar Tebir, Armenian	The first book printed here was Փոքր քերականութիւն (Poqr Qerakanutyun – Brief Armenian Grammar) in Armenian
1577	Safed	Eliezer and Abraham ben Isaac Ashkenazi (apparently no relation)	First printing press in Western Asia, publishing in Hebrew. Eliezer, a native of Prague, operated in Lublin and Constantinople before settling in Safed. First printed Lekach Tov, a commentary on the Book of Esther by 18 year old Yom Tov Tzahalon.
1584	St. Anthony's Monastery, Qozhaya, Lebanon		Introduced by Maronite Patriarch Sergius ar-Rezzi; psalter was printed the first time in 1585
1610	St. Anthony's Monastery, Qozhaya, Lebanon		Second printing press set up by Christian Maronites in Lebanon; printed both Syriac and Arabic in Syriac script
1627–1628	Istanbul	Nicodemus Metaxas	First printing press of Greek books in Ott.Empire. Closed down by the authorities in 1628
1706	Aleppo	Athanasius Dabbas	First press for printing in the Arabic script in the Ottoman Empire; operated until 1711. Funded by Constantin Brâncoveanu and established with the assistance of Anthim the Iberian.
1729	Constantinople	Ibrahim Muteferrika and Esad of Ioannina	First press for printing in the Arabic script established by Muslims in the Ottoman Empire, against opposition from the calligraphers and parts of the Ulama. It operated until 1742, producing altogether seventeen works, all of which were concerned with non-religious, utilitarian matters.
1734	Monastery of St. John of Choueir, Khenchara, Lebanon	ʻAbd Allāh Zākhir	
1759	Smyrna (Izmir)	Markos, Armenian	
1779	Constantinople	James Mario Matra (Briton)	Abortive attempt to revive printing in the Ottoman lands

According to some sources, Sultan Bayezid II and successors prohibited printing in Arabic script in the Ottoman Empire from 1483 on penalty of death, but printing in other scripts was done by Jews as well as the Greek, Armenian, and other Christian communities (1515 Saloniki, 1554 Bursa (Adrianople), 1552 Belgrade, 1658 Smyrna). Arabic-script printing by non-Muslims in the Ottoman Empire began with the press of Athanasius Dabbas in Aleppo in 1706. In 1727, Sultan Achmed III gave his permission for the establishment of the first legal print house for printing secular works by Muslims in Arabic script (Islamic religious publications still remained forbidden), but printing activities did not really take off until the 19th century.

==== Southeast Asia ====
Date	City	Country	Printer	Comment
1590	Manila	Philippines		
1668	Batavia	Indonesia		
1818	Sumatra Island	Indonesia		

==== East Asia ====
Date	City	Country	Printer	Comment
1590	Nagasaki	Japan	Alessandro Valignano	The Jesuits in Nagasaki established The Jesuit Mission Press in Japan and printed a number of books in romanised Japanese language.
1833	Macau	China		The first presses were imported by Western priests for their missionary work from Europe and America. The earliest known, an albion press, was set up in the Portuguese colony Macau and later moved to Guangzhou and Ningbo.
1883	Seoul	Korea	Inoue Kakugoro (Japanese)	The first printing press was imported from Japan for publishing Korea's first Korean-language newspaper Hansong Sunbo. After the press was destroyed by conservatives, Inoue returned with a new one from Japan, reviving the paper as a weekly under the name Hansong Chubo. Presses were also established in Seoul in 1885, 1888 and 1891 by Western missionaries. However, the earliest printing press was apparently introduced by the Japanese in the treaty port of Pusan in 1881 to publish Korea's first newspaper, the bilingual Chosen shinpo.

==== Iran ====
Date	City	Country	Printer	Comment
1636	New Julfa, Isfahan	Persia	Khachatur Kesaratsi, Armenian	The first book printed here was Սաղմոս ի Դավիթ (Saghmos i Davit – Psalter) in Armenian
1820	Tehran	Persia		
1817	Tabriz	Persia	Zain al-Abidin Tabrizi (?)	

=== United States and Canada ===
Date	City	Country	Printer	Comment
1638	Cambridge, Massachusetts	USA	Stephen Daye, Samuel Green (from 1649)	This printing shop was located in the home of the first president of Harvard College, Henry Dunster. It printed the first Bible in British North America in 1663, the Eliot Indian Bible, in English as well as Massachusett.
1682	Jamestown, Virginia	USA		
1685	Philadelphia	USA	William Bradford	
1685	St. Mary's City, Maryland	USA		William and Dinah Nuthead started a press in Annapolis in 1686
1693	New York	USA	William Bradford	
1731	Charleston, South Carolina	USA		
1735	Germantown	USA	Christoph Sauer	
1749	New Bern, North Carolina	USA		
1752	Halifax	Canada	John Bushell	The Halifax Gazette, Canada's first newspaper was published initially in this year.
1761	Wilmington, Delaware	USA		
1762	Savannah, Georgia	USA		
1764	New Orleans, Louisiana	Spanish Louisiana (later USA)		
1783	St. Augustine, Florida	La Florida (New Spain) (later USA)		
1787	Lexington, Kentucky	USA		
1791	Rogersville, Tennessee	USA		
1828	New Echota, Arkansas	USA	Elias Boudinot (Cherokee)	Boudinot published the Cherokee Phoenix as first newspaper of the tribe.
1833	Monterey, California	Mexico (later USA)		
1834	Santa Fe	Mexico (later USA)		
1846	San Francisco	USA		
1853	Oregon	USA		
1858	Vancouver Island	Canada		

=== Australia and Oceania ===
Date	City	Country	Printer	Comment
1795	?	Australia	George Hughes	
1802	Sydney	Australia	George Howe	
1818	Hobart, Tasmania	Australia		
1818	Tahiti	French Polynesia		
1821	Hawaii	Kingdom of Hawaii		
1835	Paihia	New Zealand	William Colenso	The first book was a Maori translation of part of the Bible commissioned by the Church Missionary Society: "Ko nga Pukapuka o Paora te Apotoro ki te Hunga o Epeha o Piripai" (The Epistles of St Paul to the Philippians and the Ephesians).
1836	Maui	Kingdom of Hawaii		

== See also ==
- Editio princeps

== Sources ==
- Altman, Albert A. (1984), "Korea's First Newspaper: The Japanese Chosen shinpo", The Journal of Asian Studies, 43 (4): 685–696, doi:10.2307/2057150, JSTOR 2057150, S2CID 154966097
- Appel, Klaus (1987), "Die Anfänge des Buchdrucks in Russland in der literaturfähigen Nationalsprache" [Beginnings of printing in Russia], Gutenberg-Jahrbuch (in German), 62: 95–103
- Blake, Normann F. (1978), "Dating the First Books Printed in English", Gutenberg-Jahrbuch: 43–50
- Bolza, Hans (1967), "Friedrich Koenig und die Erfindung der Druckmaschine" [Friedrich Koenig and the invention of the printing press], Technikgeschichte (in German), 34 (1): 79–89
- Borsa, Gedeon (1976), "Druckorte in Italien vor 1601" [Printing locations in Italy before 1601], Gutenberg-Jahrbuch (in German): 311–314
- Borsa, Gedeon (1977), "Drucker in Italien vor 1601" [Printers in Italy before 1601], Gutenberg-Jahrbuch (in German): 166–169
- Borsa, Gedeon (1987), "Die volkssprachigen Drucke im 15. und 16. Jahrhundert in Ungarn" [Vernacular printing in the 15th and 16th centuries in Hungary], Gutenberg-Jahrbuch (in German), 62: 10903–109108
- Clogg, Richard (1979), "An Attempt to Revive Turkish Printing in Istanbul in 1779", International Journal of Middle East Studies, 10 (1): 67–70, doi:10.1017/s0020743800053320, S2CID 159835641
- Dal, Erik (1987), "Bücher in dänischer Sprache vor 1600" [Books in Danish before 1600], Gutenberg-Jahrbuch (in German), 62: 37–46
- Gerhardt, Claus W. (1971), "Warum wurde die Gutenberg-Presse erst nach über 350 Jahren durch ein besseres System abgelöst?" [Why was the Gutenberg press replaced by a better system after more than 350 years?], Gutenberg-Jahrbuch (in German): 43–57
- Gerhardt, Claus W. (1978), "Besitzt Gutenbergs Erfindung heute noch einen Wert?" [Does Gutenberg's invention still have value today?], Gutenberg-Jahrbuch (in German): 212–217
- Horch, Rosemarie Erika (1987), "Zur Frage des ersten in portugiesischer Sprache gedruckten Buches" [On the question of the first book printed in Portuguese], Gutenberg-Jahrbuch (in German), 62: 125–134
- Krek, Miroslav (1979), "The Enigma of the First Arabic Book Printed from Movable Type", Journal of Near Eastern Studies, 38 (3): 203–212, doi:10.1086/372742, S2CID 162374182
- Kvaran, Gudrun (1997), "Die Anfänge der Buchdruckerkunst in Island und die isländische Bibel von 1584", Gutenberg-Jahrbuch (in German), 72: 140–147
- Man, John (2002), The Gutenberg Revolution: The Story of a Genius and an Invention that Changed the World, London: Review, ISBN 978-0-7472-4504-9
- McGovern, Melvin (1967), "Early Western Presses in Korea", Korea Journal: 21–23
- Moritz, Walter (1979), "Die Anfänge des Buchdrucks in Südwestafrika/Namibia", Gutenberg-Jahrbuch (in German): 269–276
- Watson, William J. (1968), "İbrāhīm Müteferriḳa and Turkish Incunabula", Journal of the American Oriental Society, 88 (3): 435–441, doi:10.2307/596868, JSTOR 596868
- Weber, Johannes (2006), "Strassburg, 1605: The Origins of the Newspaper in Europe", German History, 24 (3): 387–412, doi:10.1191/0266355406gh380oa
- Wydra, Wieslaw (1987), "Die ersten in polnischer Sprache gedruckten Texte, 1475–1520" [First texts printed in Polish, 1475–1520], Gutenberg-Jahrbuch (in German), 62: 88–94
