= Ordene de chevalerie =

Old French poem written around 1220

Li rois trestout ce escouta,
Et en aprés li demanda
S'il i failloit plus nule chose.
"Sire, οΉ, mes fere ne l'ose.
— Que ce est donc? — Ce est colee.
— Por qoi ne le m'avez donee
Et dite la senefiance?
— Sire, fet il, c'est remembrance
De celui qui l'a adoubé
A chevalier et ordené,
Mes mie ne la vous donron,
Quar je sui ci en vo prison,
Si ne doi fere vilonie
Por chose c'on me face et die;
Si ne vous vueil por ce ferir.
Bien vous devez atant souffrir.

The King listened to all this and then asked him if anything was lacking. "Sire, yes, but I dare not do it. — What is it, then? — It is the accolade. — Why have you not given it to me and told me its meaning? — Sire, he said, it is a reminder to the knight of him who dubbed him and ordained him, but I will not give it you, for I am here in your prison, and I should commit no wickedness, whatever is said or done to me; for this reason, I do not wish to strike you. You must just accept this.

— Hugh explaining why he will not give the accolade to Saladin, Ordene de chevalerie

The Ordene de chevalerie (or Ordre de chevalerie) (Note: According to Jubb 2016, p. 10n, Ordene is sometimes reserved for the poem and Ordre for its prose version.) is an anonymous Old French poem written around 1220. The story of the poem is a fiction based on historical persons and events in and around the Kingdom of Jerusalem before the Third Crusade. The title translates to Order of Knighthood.

It is one of the earliest and most influential surviving didactic texts devoted to chivalry and it achieved a wide reception both in France and elsewhere. It is an explicitly Christian work that seeks "to assign to knighthood its proper place in a Christian society".

== Synopsis and background ==
In the poem, Prince Hugh II of Tiberias (Hue de Tabarie) is captured in a skirmish by Saladin, king of Egypt. During his captivity he instructs Saladin in the order of chivalry and leads him through the stages of becoming a knight, although he refuses to give him the accolade. In the end, Hugh asks Saladin to give him money to pay his ransom and the king instructs his emirs to give money to Hugh, who thereby pays his ransom and has money to spare.

This fictional account seems to be based on the conflation of a historical event and a legendary one regarded as historical at the end of the 12th century. In 1178 or 1179, Hugh of Tiberias, who was also prince of Galilee, was captured in a skirmish by the troops of Saladin on the banks of the Litani River not far from Beaufort Castle. He was soon released. This event seems to have been merged with the legend that Lord Humphrey II of Toron, a vassal of Hugh, so impressed Saladin as a warrior that the latter asked to be knighted by him. A desire to increase the prestige of the house of saint-Omer may have motivated the poet to transfer the legend of the knighting of Saladin from Hugh's vassal to Hugh himself.

== Manuscripts and reception ==
A prose version of the poem appeared early. The poem (or its prose version) survives in whole or in part in ten medieval manuscripts, a further five modern ones and has been printed at least five times. The prose version is also found inserted into two manuscripts of the Estoire d'Eracles and its continuations. The medievalist Pierre Legrand d'Aussy published a prose adaptation of the poem in 1779. Georges Bataille wrote his doctoral thesis on the poem in 1922, but it was never deposited in the École nationale des chartes.

It is difficult to trace the influence of the Ordene de chevalerie on the chivalric tradition. It has been claimed without evidence as a source for Ramon Llull's Book on the Order of Chivalry. Nonetheless, the text was quite popular. It probably drew inspiration from Chrétien de Troyes, especially Le Conte du Graal.

== Language and author ==
The language of the poem is Old French of the Francien variety with Picard characteristics. The earliest and most reliable manuscripts were copied by scribes of a similar background to the poet, preserving the Franco-Picard nature of the poem, but there is also an Anglo-Norman manuscript group copied by scribes who have in some places altered the text in conformity with the Anglo-Norman dialect.

Earlier scholars erroneously believed that the poem was written by its hero, Hugh. In fact, the poet appears not to have been a knight but rather a cleric and possibly even a priest. The tone of the poem has been likened to that of a sermon and Bataille went so far as to suggest that it may have been designed to be read publicly in church. Judging by his language and his choice of hero, the poet was probably from the vicinity of Saint-Omer.

== Influence ==
Start of the Dutch version in an Oxford manuscript

The Ordene de chevalerie was an influential text. Three prose redactions—two of the 13th and one of the 15th century—are known from seven manuscripts. In the 14th century, Geoffroy de Charny, in his prose Livre de chevalerie, quotes from the Ordene, although it is impossible to tell if he had before himself a verse or prose version. The anonymous 14th-century poem Le pas Saladin was influenced by the Ordene.

Outside of France, the Ordene was most influential in Italy. It is paraphrased in a cycle of sonnets by Folgore da San Gimignano and the tale is incorporated into three Italian prose works: Bosone da Gubbio's Fortunatus Siculus, Anton Francesco Doni's Novelle and the Novellino. There is also a Middle Dutch version by Hein van Aken, entitled Van den Coninc Saladijn ende van Hughen van Tabaryen. This version includes the Franco-Picard prologue (which differs from the Anglo-Norman). It is preserved in three manuscripts. The Dutch prose work D'ystorie van Saladine printed by Arend de Keysere around 1480 merely contains the character of Hugh of Tiberias but is otherwise unrelated to the Ordene.
