= Le Pas Saladin =

14th-century Old French poem

- Author(s): Anonymous
- Language: Old French
- Date: 1300s
- Manuscript(s): MS Bibliotheque Nationale 24432, Paris
- Setting: Third Crusade
- Personages: Saladin, Richard I of England, Philip Augustus of France, Guy of Lusignan

Le Pas Saladin (Old French for 'Saladin's Pass') is a fourteenth-century poem in Old French, describing a fictitious battle where a group of twelve crusaders including Richard the Lionheart hold a mountain pass against the army of Saladin. It survives in one manuscript, Bibliothèque Nationale 24432.

The poem did not originate the story, and the term Pas Saladin is used consistently across medieval sources to name the common motif of Richard and eleven or twelve other knights standing against Saladin's army. Versions featuring slightly different groups of knights defending a pass, a bridge, a castle, or the city of Jaffa are recounted or referenced in a number of other medieval texts, and it was a popular subject for visual art in the thirteenth and fourteenth centuries.

== Summary ==
The crusader kingdoms of Jerusalem and Acre have been lost, due to five crusader lords betraying the King of Jerusalem, Guy of Lusignan. When the news reaches Pope Lucius, he calls for a new crusade, which King Philip Augustus of France and King Richard of England join. When they arrive in the Holy Land, they meet Guy, who explains how the traitors betrayed him to Saladin, but that Saladin treated him well and let him go.

The crusaders go to besiege Tyre. Saladin plans a surprise attack through the mountain pass at "Armonie". Philip seeks advice from his barons and Richard on what to do. Guillaume le Barrois and Hues de Florine say they will defend the pass; each picks five other men, for a total of twelve.

Saladin's army attacks the pass. The knights immediately kill two of his commanders, and the army cannot break through. Saladin sends a spy, Tornevent, to find out why. Tornevent reports that the pass is being held by only twelve knights, and lists who they are, having recognised them from their heraldry.

Saladin, as a lover of chivalry, cannot bear to push on and kill the twelve. Instead, he calls the retreat and his army departs for Damietta. The twelve knights return to the crusader forces and are greeted as heroes.

== Manuscript ==
The opening of Le Pas Saladin. The poem begins under the gap on the right: a space was left for a miniature that was never inserted.

Le Pas Saladin is known from a single manuscript, MS Bibliothèque Nationale fonds français 24432. It is 611 lines long, in octosyllabic rhymed couplets. The explicit gives it the title le pas Salhadin. The manuscript is a collection of shorter pieces, dominated by religious texts and morality tales, and including many poems of similar length and structure to Le Pas Saladin. It was most likely produced in the first half of the 1300s. The date of the poem's original composition is unknown, but R. S. Loomis judges that the inclusion of Guillaume Longu'Espée as one of the knights means that it was likely composed after the death of the historical William Longespée the Younger in 1250.

The poem has been edited four times in the modern era: by Guillaume Stanislas Trébutien in 1836; by Frank Lodeman in 1897 as a set of four articles, of which the text itself is the second; by Danièle Gatto-Pyko and H. F. Williams in 1976; and by Richard Leson, Linda M. Paterson and Carol Sweetenham in 2026. The 2026 edition includes a prose translation into English.

=== Language ===
The dialect of the poem is dominated by forms characteristic of Île-de-France (central France and Paris) with some that suggest the northeastern regions of Picardy and Wallonia (now part of Belgium). Lodeman proposes that the poem's original author was from Île-de-France and that the copyist of the specific manuscript might have been from the northeast; Leson, Paterson and Sweetenham tend to agree. Loomis instead suggests that the original author was from Wallonia or the French–German border, based on the prominent role given to knights from the region.

=== Sources ===
The poem explicitly compares the fictional setting to the Battle of Roncevaux Pass, the last stand of the French folk hero Roland as portrayed in the Song of Roland, with the twelve knights echoing the Twelve Peers of Charlemagne's legendary entourage. Le Pas Saladin is similar in some respects to the broader chanson de geste genre which the Song of Roland established, such as in its descriptions of battles. Chansons de geste were frequently adapted into other poetic formats; Le Pas Saladin might have had a direct chanson de geste source, but could equally well be drawing on miscellaneous tropes of the genre.

The first lines of a Dutch version of the Ordene de chevalerie. The rubric reads dit es van Saladijn – 'this is the dit (a type of poem) of Saladin'.

Le Pas Saladin shows resemblances to an anonymous work usually known as the Ménestrel de Reims ('Minstrel of Reims') after its unnamed author; one such similarity is the shared portrayal of Guy of Lusignan as the victim of a conspiracy led by Raymond of Tripoli. It is possible that Le Pas Saladin used the Ménestrel as a source, or that both of them reflect a narrative in wider circulation.

The depiction of Saladin as a chivalrous enemy, who chooses not to kill the twelve knights because he respects their valour, paraphrases a poem of around 1220, the Ordene de chevalerie ('Order of Chivalry'). In the Ordene, a fictionalised version of Hugh II of Saint-Omer discusses the nature of chivalry with Saladin while held captive by him.

== Historical background ==
=== Events depicted ===
Illustration of Guy of Lusignan departing for the Battle of Hattin, from a 15th-century French manuscript.

Saladin's forces had defeated those of the crusader kingdoms in 1187 at the Battle of Hattin. The crusaders were surrounded and fighting in extreme heat without adequate water supplies; as well as suffering heavy casualties, many prominent crusader lords including Guy of Lusignan were taken prisoner, and a relic of the True Cross was lost.

In the following months, Saladin reconquered most of the crusader territories in the Holy Land. When the news reached Europe, Pope Gregory VIII issued the papal bull Audita tremendi, calling for a new crusade. (The poem's Pope Lusiiens likely refers to his predecessor, Lucius III, who had died in 1185.) After two years of fundraising and preparations, the Third Crusade eventually got under way in 1189. Philip Augustus of France and Richard of England both arrived in the Holy Land in 1191, Philip first and Richard six weeks later. The crusader army recaptured Acre in July 1191 after a long siege, after which Philip returned home, a move criticised by his peers. Richard remained in the Holy Land and won several more victories, notably the defence of Jaffa, but did not retake Jerusalem. In 1192, he signed a treaty with Saladin and also departed. He and Saladin never met in person.

=== The twelve knights ===
All of the knights in the poem are identifiable as real people, but were not all crusaders; they were also not historically a group, but fought in different campaigns at different times, including on opposite sides of the same conflict. Many of the knights come from Flanders (northeastern France and modern Belgium) and northwest Germany, suggesting the poet had a connection with that part of Europe.

Romances from as early as the 1220s feature tournaments where a subset of the knights cameo as competitors. Leson, Paterson and Sweetenham propose that the 12 in the poem were most likely selected because they were already well known as both real and fictional heroes – "famous for being famous" – rather than for any particular action on crusade. Other versions of the Pas Saladin story in text and art substitute different knights for some or all of the twelve. This may reflect how different crusaders became more or less prominent in culture over time; it may also reflect that certain authors, artists, or their patrons wanted to see local heroes - or, for nobles, their own ancestors - included in the legend.

The twelve in Le Pas Saladin, in the order they appear, are:

A nineteenth-century woodcut of Guillaume des Barres, copied from a medieval drawing in the records of the Abbey of Fontenay.

- Hues de Florine: Hugh of Rumigny and Florennes, who took the cross in 1188 and had relatives on the Second Crusade.
- Guillaume le Barrois: Guillaume des Barres, a French crusader who fought at Acre and Arsuf, and stayed in the Holy Land as part of Richard's army after King Philip Augustus left; named as especially valiant in the Estoire de la guerre sainte. He is often referred to in the poem simply as li Barrois ['of Barres'] and so the poet may also have blurred him with the unrelated but similarly titled Henry of Bar, who died at Acre.
- Gofroy de Lusegnon: Geoffrey of Lusignan, the brother of Guy of Lusignan; fought at Acre and was briefly Count of Jaffa and Ascalon; named as especially valiant in the chronicle Estoire de la guerre sainte.
- Gautier de Chastelon: Walter III of Châtillon. Lodeman suggests he may also be inspired by Raynald of Châtillon, who was captured and executed after the Battle of Hattin in 1187.
- Renart de Boloigne: Renaud of Boulogne, who did not take part in the Third Crusade but was allied to both King Philip and King Richard at different times.
- Valerant de Lenbor: Waleran III of Limburg, who took the cross in 1196 and commanded a crusader force raised by Henry VI of Germany.
- Roi Richars d'Angleterre: Richard I of England. Richard commanded the English army in person at the Siege of Acre, the Battle of Arsuf and the Battle of Jaffa, all crusader victories. As well being King of England in his own right, he held extensive lands on the Continent, for which he was formally a vassal of King Philip of France, but the two frequently quarrelled.
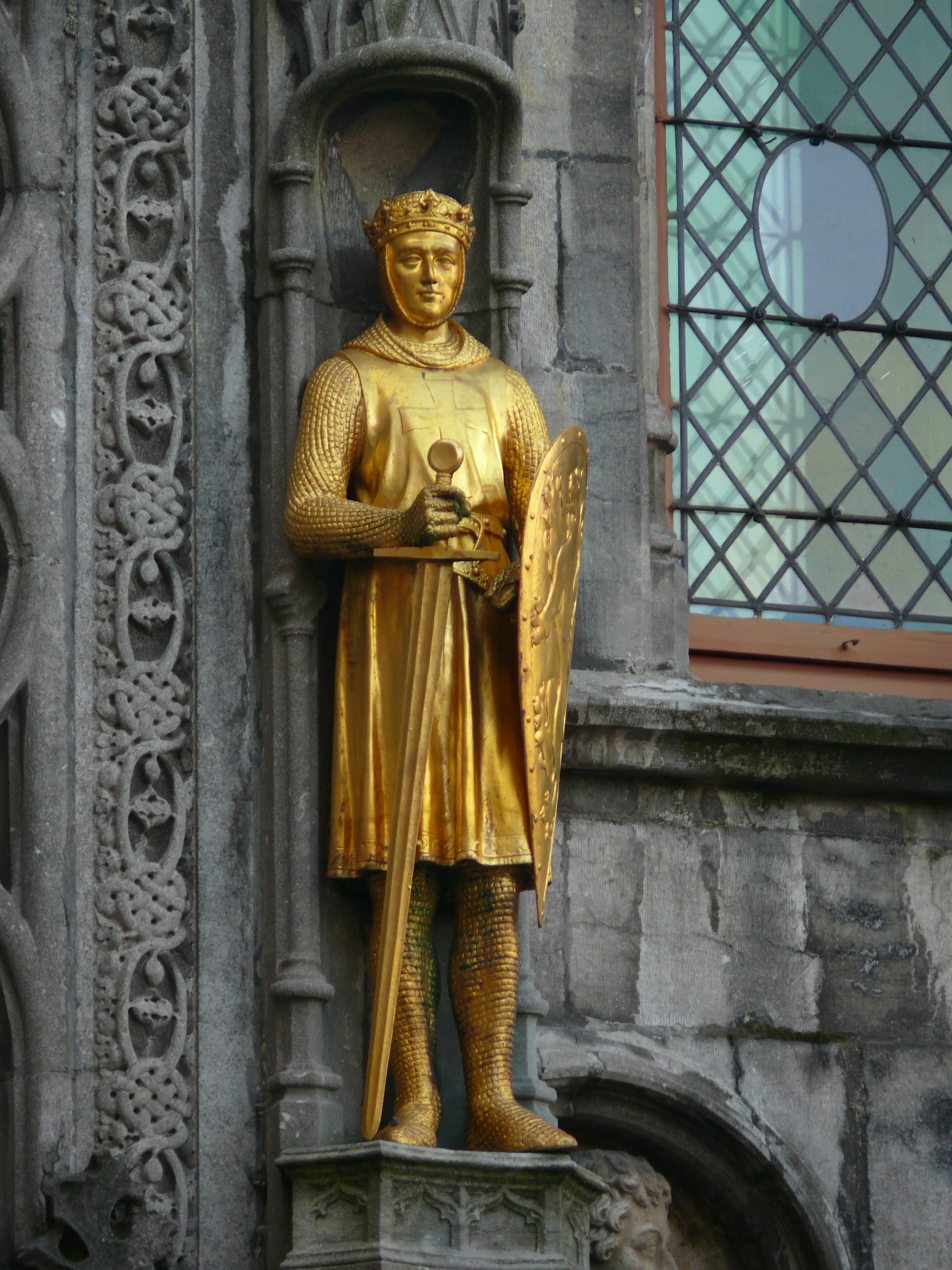
  A statue of Philip of Flanders in Bruges.
- Philippon de Flandres: Philip I of Flanders, who fought in the Third Crusade and died at the Siege of Acre.
- Guillaume Longu'Espee: William Longespée ('Longsword') was Richard I's half-brother, who did not go on crusade; his son William Longespée the Younger did, dying at the Battle of Mansurah in 1250, and was celebrated as a hero and martyr. The poet may have misunderstood the details of one man or the other's life, or conflated the two either accidentally or on purpose. It is possible that the unrelated William Longsword of Montferrat, father of Baldwin V of Jerusalem, was also an inspiration.
- Simon de Monfors: Simon de Montfort, 5th Earl of Leicester, a prominent figure in the Fourth Crusade and the Albigensian Crusade. He did not fight in the Third Crusade, but it is possible the poet confused or conflated him with his brother Guy de Montfort, Lord of Sidon, who did.
- Bernarz de Horstrinale: Bernard of Horstmar, a knight mentioned in chronicles as fighting with Richard at Acre and later joining the army of Waleran of Limburg. Mentioned as especially valiant in the chronicle De rebus gestis ultramarinis.
- Tiry de Cleves: Dietrich of Cleves. ("Tiry" = Thierry, the French equivalent of Dietrich.) Mentioned in chronicles as fighting in the Third Crusade, first with Frederick Barbarossa, then with Richard. He was involved in founding the Teutonic Order.

=== Connection with the battle of Jaffa ===
Gaston Paris proposed in 1893 that the story derives from a real incident during Richard's relief of Jaffa: "où [...] avec un très petit nombre d'hommes, à faire reculer toute l'armée musulmane et obligé Saladin à la retraite" ('when [...] with a very small number of men, he had pushed back all of the Muslim army and obliged Saladin to retreat'). The chronicler Baha ad-Din ibn Shaddad records how Saladin mounted a surprise attack to retake the city before crusader reinforcements could arrive, but was held off by a much smaller force of defenders led by Richard. He also gives its exact date, 5 August 1192.

A miniature from Walters Art Museum manuscript W142, illustrating the Battle of Jaffa with a scene from the Pas Saladin

A small number of medieval sources do associate the battle and the story of the dozen knights at the pass. One manuscript of the Histoire d'Outremer, the Old French translation of a Latin chronicle by William of Tyre, illustrates the battle with an illumination of Richard and eleven knights, and the rubric refers to the battle as the "pas Salehadin". The Latin Chronica Monasterii Sancti Bertini refers to the thwarted surprise attack at Jaffa as facto quod dicitur passus Salahadini ('the deed Saladin is said to have suffered'), and names the defenders as Richard and eleven other knights, many of whose names overlap with those in Le Pas Saladin. The Chronique de Flandre gives a similar portrayal of the battle and also lists Richard and eleven knights; the list again overlaps but does not exactly match either Le Pas Saladin or the Chronica.

Scholars disagree on whether Paris is correct in his theory that the poem evolved from a depiction of real events at Jaffa. Chism and Luchitskaya both consider that it did. Leson, Paterson and Sweetenham find it significant that some fictional versions, including the poem, pre-date the chronicle sources that link the twelve knights to Jaffa. They propose that rather than the fictional account being inspired by the battle, elements from the fiction were added into later chronicles by writers attempting to fit what was by then a popular story into the historical record.

=== Political context ===
The poem takes the position that Guy of Lusignan was the only legitimate king of Jerusalem, and that the defeat at Hattin was not his fault but the result of treason.One of the traitors named in the poem does not clearly correspond to a real person, but the other four do: historically, all four were Guy's political opponents and had in some cases openly defied his wishes.

Leson, Paterson and Sweetenham consider the poem to be part of a wider narrative, visible across French crusade literature of the thirteenth and fourteenth century, which aimed to glorify the Capetian dynasty and elide its failings: the loss of Jerusalem is put down to treason rather than incompetence, Philip Augustus is portrayed as the leader of the Third Crusade, and his deeds held up as comparable to Charlemagne's. Tolan proposes that the poem is specifically French counter-propaganda produced in response to portrayals of the crusade which focused on the Lionheart and did not include the French king. (In other versions of the motif, especially later ones, Philip is "minimised or disappeared" and the focus is on Richard.) Chism writes that the happy ending, where Philip personally welcomes back the defenders and throws a feast, also erases the historical enmity between the two kings, replacing it with an image of "Christian solidarity".

== Other uses of the motif ==
The story, or images from it – usually the twelve knights and Tornevent pointing them out – is found in both text and art, in multiple countries across several centuries. The name "Pas Saladin" is consistently given to the motif of the defence by the twelve knights, even in versions that do not place it at an actual pass.

=== In text ===
The coat of arms of Andre de Chauvigny, who appears in several versions of the Pas Saladin story.

==== Chronique de Flandre ====
The Chronique de Flandre dates from the middle fourteenth century and was likely written in Saint-Omer. It places the action at the relief of Jaffa, and names the twelve knights as King Richard, Guillaume des Barres, William Longespée, Gautier de Chatillon, the count of Cleves, the count of Montfort, the count of Limburg, the count of "Oste" in Germany (possibly Bernard de Horstemale), Waleran de Luxembourg (another title of Waleran of Limburg, who is therefore included twice), "Andrieu de Savingny" (André de Chauvigny), "Drieu de Mellon" (Dreux de Mello), and the baron of "Estanfort", which Loomis suggests is Steenvoorde.

==== Chronica Monasterii Sancti Bertini ====
The Chronica Monasterii Sancti Bertini is a Latin chronicle from the later fourteenth century, named for and written at the Abbey of Saint Bertin near Saint-Omer. It also places the incident at Jaffa. Its list of knights is Gaultier of Blois, Count Guy de Montfort (Simon de Montfort's brother), Andre de Chauvigny, Dreux de Mello, Guillaume des Barres, Hugo de Florine, the duke of Limburg, the count of Hoste, the count of Cleves, William Longsword, and the baron de Stagno.

A miniature from the Paris manuscript of the Livre du Chevalier Errant, illustrating a version of the Pas Saladin motif. André de Chauvigny is recognisable by his shield at the back of the line.

==== Livre du Chevalier Errant ====
The Livre du Chevalier Errant ('Book of the Knight-Errant') is a 1394 poem by the marquess Thomas III of Saluzzo which features both real and fictional knights as chivalric heroes. In the passage on Richard the Lionheart, it mentions how he led twelve knights (for a total of thirteen) to the defence of a castle at "Barut"; the lines are accompanied by a miniature of knights defending a bridge. Richard's twelve companions lack first names but their various noble titles are mostly the same as those in other texts: the count of Blois, the count of Monfort, the count of Boulogne, the count of Cleves, the count of Salebruge, the lord of Merlo, the lord of Barres, the lord of Lusignan, the lord of Chauvigny, the lord of Florennes, the lord of Pomponne, and the lord of Estangort.

==== Froissart's Chronicles ====
The fourteenth-century Chronicles of Jean Froissart mention the story briefly in the first book as an example of heroic deeds that should be recorded, describing "the twelve knightly companions who defended the pass against Saladin and his power".

==== Nuova Cronica ====
The fourteenth-century Nuova Cronica was written by Giovanni Villani, a politician from Florence. He mentions how Richard the Lionheart went to Outremer with Philip of France, and "with twelve other barons of France and England held the pass against Saladin".

==== Jehan d'Avesnes ====
A version of the episode appears in the romance Jehan d'Avesnes, a compilation of several existing texts assembled in the fifteenth century for Charles the Bold. In this retelling, Saladin invades England but is repelled by Richard and a small group of knights at a mountain pass "between Scotland and Warwick". Here, the names accompanying Richard are the count of Flanders, Andre de Chauvigny, Guillaume de Barres, William Longespée, Hugh de Florenne, the duke of Limburg, the duke of Luxembourg (a duplicated title of Waleran of Limburg again), Gautier de Chatillon, the count of Joigny and the count of Monfort. The count of Cleves is also mentioned.

=== In art ===
The poem itself mentions in two different places that the knights are commemorated in paintings in castle halls, suggesting that the story was already established as a subject for visual art before the poem was written. Loomis identifies the Pas Saladin as "one of the favorite themes of secular decorative art" in the thirteenth and fourteenth centuries. The transmission of the narrative was accompanied by "a recognized tradition assign[ing] to each warrior a distinctive heraldic device", which was still in use as late as the mid-sixteenth century as shown by the Valenciennes armorial.

Known examples of the Pas Saladin motif in visual art include:

==== Sala di Sant'Alberto paintings ====
The only location where a wall painting like that mentioned in the poem is known to survive is in the Sala di Sant'Alberto (Hall of St Albert) at the Palazzo Galganetti, one of the buildings of the bishop's palace in Colle di Val d'Elsa, where in 1932 restoration work uncovered a rare set of frescoes dating to the fourteenth century. In 1996, Piergiacomo Petrioli finally identified the largest fresco, showing a procession of knights, as depicting the Pas Saladin. The painting is badly damaged, but from inscriptions and heraldry in the visible sections, it is possible to tell that the group of knights includes men not found across the text sources, such as Raymond du Puy, a Grand Master of the Hospitallers in the mid-1100s; Amadeus III of Savoy, who went on the Second Crusade in 1147; and possibly also Amadeus VI of Savoy, who campaigned against the Ottoman Empire in the 1360s. They may have been selected by the person commissioning the artwork; the identities of both the commissioner and the painter are unknown.

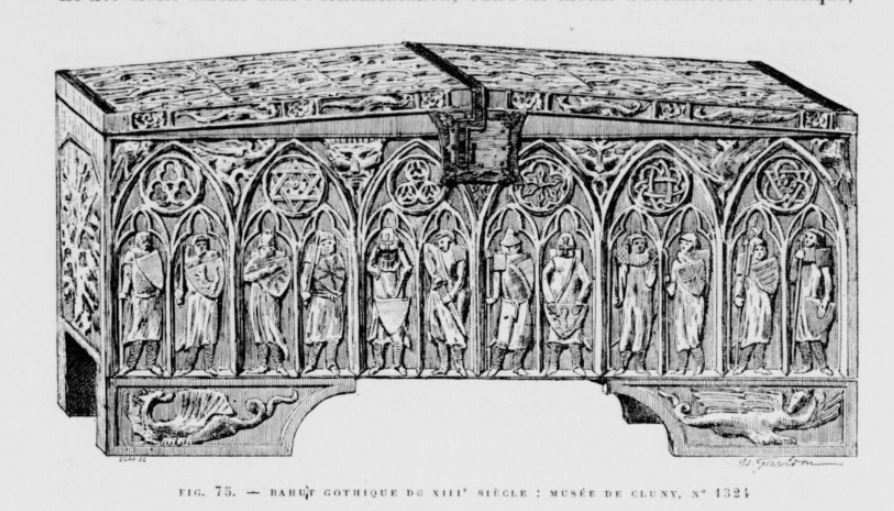
A 1900 illustration of the Cluny chest, showing the twelve knights.

==== Cluny chest ====
An oak chest held at the Musée de Cluny is carved on two sides with images from the Pas Saladin: one short side shows Saladin and Tornevent, and one long side shows the twelve knights. They are identifiable by their heraldry as the same set of twelve as in Le Pas Saladin, with some uncertainty over Bernard of Horstmar. Loomis believed it to be a nineteenth-century copy of a fourteenth-century carving; it was later shown that most of the object was in fact original. Loomis dates the original artwork to 1320-1330 based on the style of armour in the depiction of the knights.

==== Gort chest ====
A fourteenth-century ivory casket shows the Pas Saladin on its back panel. It was found in "a Brighton junk shop" in 1945, and was subsequently acquired by John Vereker, 6th Viscount Gort, who donated it to the Winnipeg Art Gallery; later research found it had previously belonged to the landowning Hoare family of Devon. The chest has scenes from several different tales, and only the one panel depicts the Pas Saladin, showing the twelve knights and Tornevent pointing them out. Loomis dates it to around 1315, again based on the style of armour shown; James Bugslag instead proposes 1340-60 based on the style of carving.

1851 drawing of the ivory mirror case showing the Pas Saladin

==== British Museum mirror case ====
A broken ivory object held by the British Museum, thought to be a case for a hand mirror, shows what appears to be a scene from the Pas Saladin: eight of the twelve knights are visible in an arrangement very similar to that on the Gort chest, along with a group of Saracen soldiers above. The object was previously thought to be a forgery, but the ivory has since been carbon dated to the twelfth or thirteenth century, making this less likely (though still possible that a forger could have re-cut a medieval piece of ivory). The lower part of the item shows a sleeping knight with a plant tendril creeping over him, possibly illustrating an episode from the Roland tradition where lances planted in the ground miraculously blossom overnight.

==== Valenciennes armorial ====
The Pas Saladin story is mentioned in an armorial (illustrated manuscript recording coats of arms) dated to the sixteenth century, now held as MS 1025 at the Médiathèque Simone Veil in Valenciennes and attributed to the artist and herald Jacques le Boucq. The manuscript illustrates the heraldry for twelve knights described as holding a bridge at "Norenthon" (Northampton), suggesting the same English setting as Jehan d'Avesnes. They are named as King Richard, Philip of Flanders, Waleran de Limburg, the count of Cleves, Renaud of Dammartin (another title of Renaud of Boulogne), the count of Montfort, the count of Stambourg, Waleran of Luxembourg (again duplicating Waleran of Limburg), Andre de Chauvigny, Gautier de Chatillon, Hugo de Florennes, and William Longespée.

==== Lost examples ====
A number of medieval records including receipts, inventories and wills make references to now-lost art objects showing scenes from the Pas Saladin, attesting to its popularity. Known examples include a large and intricately ornamented fountain showing "those who were at the Saladin pass" in the bowl, mentioned in the household inventories of Louis I of Anjou between 1351 and 1380; a jewel bought by or for John II of France with "un pas Salladin", recorded in a 1350s inventory; a golden hanap (goblet or ceremonial cup) enamelled with scenes "au pas Salhadin", also owned by Louis of Anjou; a wall painting at the castle of Valenciennes depicting "le pas Salehadin", paid for in 1375–6; a tapestry owned by Edward the Black Prince showing "le pas de Saladyn", mentioned in his will; and a golden seal or lock owned by Charles V of France.

=== In performance ===
In 1389, Isabeau of Bavaria's ceremonial arrival into Paris for her coronation was accompanied by a pageant, or set of tableaux vivants, which included a depiction of the Pas Saladin featuring the twelve knights and their heraldry.

The dolmen known as the Pierre-Levée, formerly the Passelourdin.

=== In place names ===
Antoine Thomas, in 1908, theorised that a dolmen in Poitiers called the Passelourdin (now known as the Pierre Levée) derived its name ultimately from the Pas Saladin. The spelling Passallardin is also attested, and a 1425 parliamentary document gives it as Passeladin. Thomas proposed that it could have been named from an association either with Richard the Lionheart, whose French lands included the countship of Poitiers; or with Andre de Chauvigny, also from nearby.

== Relationship to the pas d'armes ==
About a century after Le Pas Saladin, in the early 1400s, a style of knightly contest developed known as the pas d'armes ('passage of arms'). A knight would choose a location such as a bridge or crossroads and issue a challenge, declaring that he would defend it alone, or with a small group, against all comers. Brown-Grant, Damen and Blunk suggest that the name and conceit of the pas d'armes may derive from the Pas Saladin, and note that pas d'armes always had a "fictional underpinning", with challenge wording and set-dressing of the combat ground imitating episodes from romance, pastoral or allegorical literature. Leson, Paterson and Sweetenham also comment on the similarity of the poem's events to the later pas d'armes, mentioning that the poem's twelve knights were already well known as tournament combatants when it was written, and that Guillaume des Barres and Hues de Florine choose their companions rather like captains picking teams.
