= Edward Raban =

Edward Raban may refer to:

- Edward Raban (printer) (died 1658), English printer associated with Aberdeen, Scotland
- Edward Raban (British Army officer) (1850–1927), British Army officer in the Royal Engineers
