= Jakob Karweyse =

Jakob Karweyse (also Karweysse; fl. 1492) was a goldsmith in Marienburg (Malbork) in the Kingdom of Poland. He is considered to have been the first Prussian printer.

Karweyse, who was probably a native, became in 1476 citizen of Marienburg. In 1492 he printed Johannes of Marienwerder's book Leben der zeligen vrouwen Dorothea, which described the life of Saint Dorothea von Montau.

== Works ==
- Johannes von Marienwerder: Leben der seligen Dorothea. Marienburg: Jakob Karweysse, 1492. 8° IBP 3173. Borm: IG 1781. (M14326)
- Johannes von Marienwerder: Leben der seligen Dorothea. [Marienburg: Jakob Karweysse, um 1492]. 4° (GW M14327)
- Ein Passienbüchlein von den vier Hauptjungfrauen. [Marienburg: Jakob Karweysse]. 8°, IBP 4167. (GW M29578)

== See also ==
- Incunabula
- Johannes Gutenberg
- Movable type
- Printing
- Spread of the printing press
