= Hein van Aken =

Medieval Flemish poet

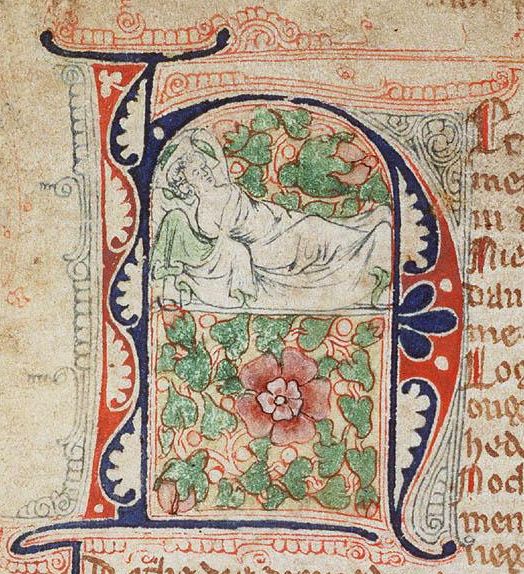
Hein van Aken dreaming of a rose.

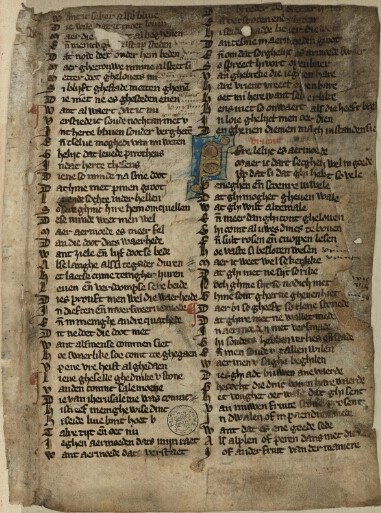
Excerpt from "Die Rose". Written by Hein van Aken. Manufactured in the 14th century. Preserved in the University Library of Ghent.

Hein van Aken, also called Hendrik van Aken or van Haken, was the parish priest in Korbeek-Lo, between Leuven and Brussels. He was born in Brussels, probably in the thirteenth century. He translated the Roman de la Rose by Guillaume de Lorris and Jean de Meun to Dutch, with the title Het Bouc van der Rosen. Hein's translation, also commonly called Die Rose, was widespread. This is notable due to the many manuscripts and excerpts that are still preserved, for example in the University Library of Ghent.

Hein van Aken could also be the author of the Roman van Heinric and Margriete van Limborch, which was started in 1291 and completed in 1318. It is a courtly adventure novel in twelve books, which deliberately imitates the Aeneid epic by Virgil. The manuscript is held at Leiden University Libraries.

He is probably also the poet of a Dutch reworking of the French Ordene de chevalerie. With less reason, some also attribute the Natuurkunde van het Geheel-al to him, but a poem by him must be kept in the Comburger manuscript.

In the Leeckenspeigel, some work by him has been intertwined, amongst others. His rhymed essay Over de Dichtkunst (On Poetry), which has been called remarkable by reviewers because of the common sense that prevails in it.
