= Alphabetum Ibericum sive Georgianum cum Oratione =

First Georgian-language book printed with movable type

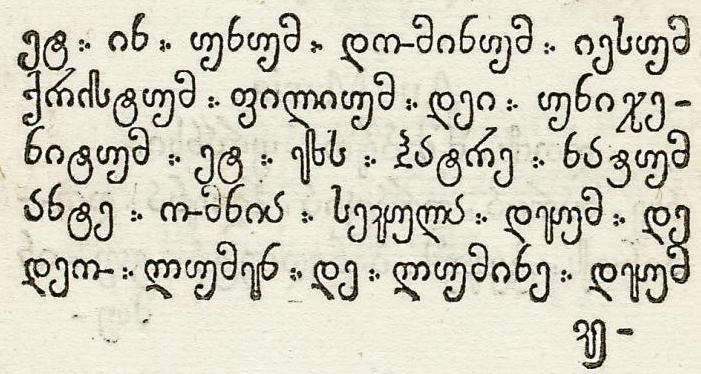
Latin text written in Georgian. Text is the second article of the Nicene Creed.

Alphabetum Ibericum sive Georgianum cum Oratione (literally "Iberian or Georgian Alphabet with Prayers") is the first book printed in the Georgian language using movable type in 1629 at Palazzo di Propaganda Fide. The book was printed along with Dittionario giorgiano e italiano by Nikoloz Cholokashvili, the ambassador of the Georgian king Teimuraz I, in Rome. It includes a guide for Latin speakers on reading and pronouncing Georgian written in Mkhedruli script.
