= Battle of Jaffa (1192) =

Battle of the Third Crusade

Coordinates: 32°3′15.87″N 34°45′5.92″E

- Part of the Third Crusade
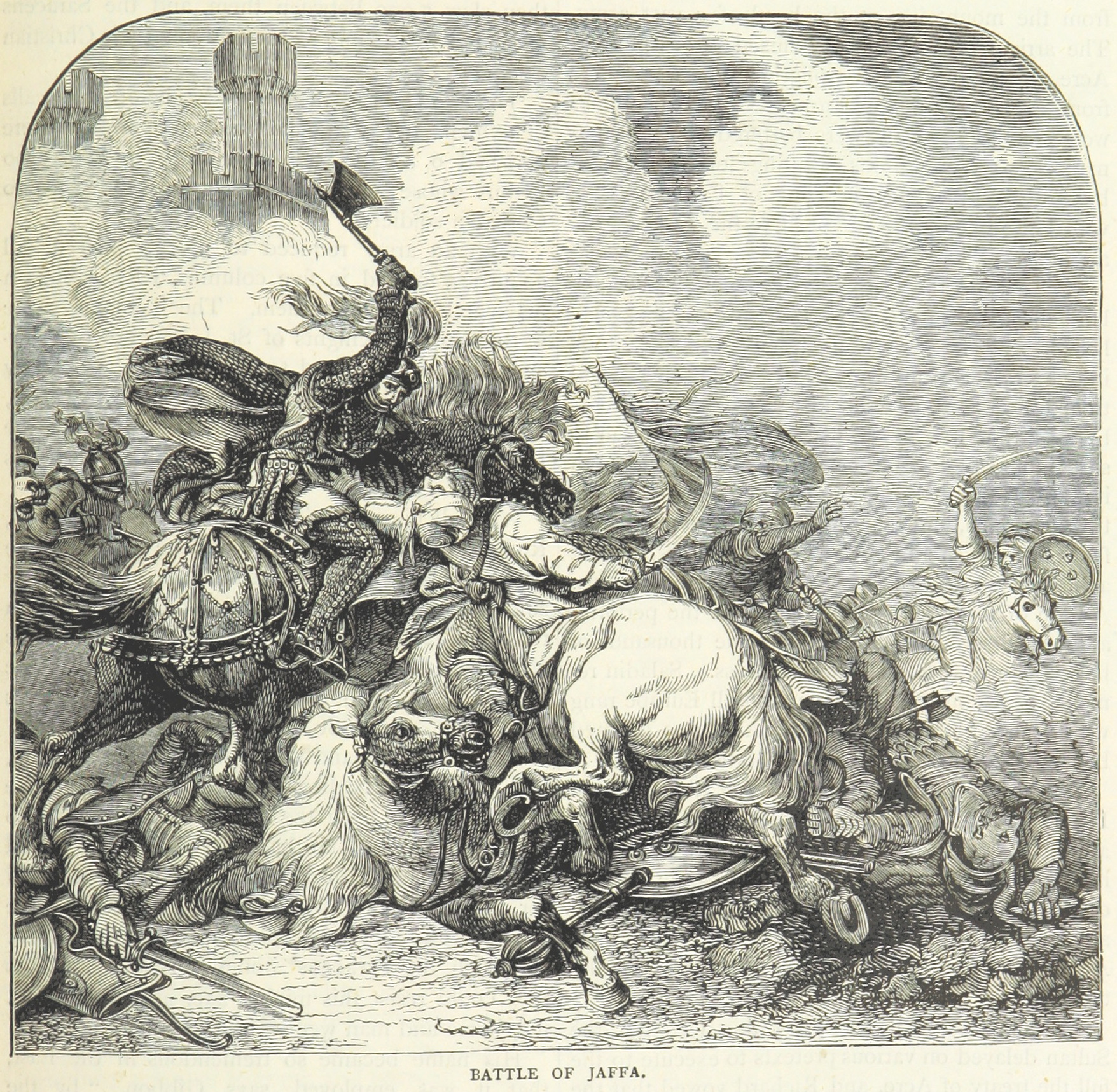
Date	8 August 1192 (the conflict at Jaffa extended from 27 July to 8 August)
Location	Jaffa, Kingdom of Jerusalem
Result	Crusader victory

Belligerents
Angevin Empire; Republic of Genoa; Republic of Pisa	Ayyubids

Commanders and leaders
Richard I, King of England	Saladin, Sultan of Egypt and Syria

Strength
55-80 knights 2,000 infantry (including Genoese & Pisan crossbowmen)	7,000 cavalrymen

Casualties and losses
At least 2 dead, many wounded	700 dead + 1,500 horses

The Battle of Jaffa took place during the Crusades, as one of a series of campaigns between the army of Sultan Saladin (Ṣalāḥ al-Dīn Yūsuf ibn Ayyūb) and the Crusader forces led by King Richard I of England (known as Richard the Lionheart). It was the final battle of the Third Crusade, after which Saladin and King Richard were able to negotiate a truce. Although the Crusaders did not regain possession of Jerusalem, Christian pilgrims were permitted entry into the city, and the Crusaders were able to retain control of a sizable strip of land stretching from Beirut to Jaffa.

Although largely a footnote among the greater events that unfolded during the Crusades, the battle was a decisive encounter, in that it forced Saladin to negotiate an end to the immediate hostilities. The battle illustrated the determined spirit of Saladin and the courage and tactical skill of Richard. It was the final armed encounter between the two monarchs before the ratification of the Treaty of Jaffa brought the Crusade to an end. The battle ensured that the Crusader presence in the south of Palestine was secure.

== Prelude ==
On 7 September 1191, after the Battle of Arsuf, the Crusader army proceeded from Arsuf to Jaffa, which the Crusaders took and fortified. Jaffa, they hoped, would be the base of operations in a drive to reconquer Jerusalem itself. As the winter of 1191–1192 approached, sporadic negotiations between Richard I and Saladin were taken up, though without any immediate result.

In late November 1191 the Crusader army advanced inland towards Jerusalem. In early December Saladin was under pressure from his emirs to disband the greater part of his army, which he reluctantly did on the twelfth of that month. Learning this, Richard pushed his army forward, spending Christmas at Latrun. The army then marched to Beit Nuba, only 12 miles from Jerusalem. Muslim morale in Jerusalem was so low that the arrival of the Crusaders would probably have caused the city to fall quickly. However, the weather was appallingly bad, cold with heavy rain and hailstorms. The poor weather, combined with the fear that if it besieged Jerusalem the Crusader army might be trapped by a relieving force, caused the decision to retreat back to the coast to be made.

During the winter months, Richard's men occupied and refortified Ascalon, whose fortifications had earlier been razed by Saladin. The spring of 1192 saw continued negotiations and further skirmishing between the opposing forces. The Crusader army made another advance on Jerusalem, coming within sight of the city before being forced to retreat once again because of dissension amongst its leaders. During this period, Richard began to receive disturbing news of the activities of his brother John and the French king, Philip Augustus. As the spring gave way to summer, it became evident that Richard would soon have to return to his own lands to safeguard his interests.

== Contest for the control of Jaffa ==
=== Saladin takes Jaffa ===
By July 5, 1192, Richard began his withdrawal from the Holy Land. Having realized that Jerusalem would not be defensible if it were to be captured, he began the retreat of Crusader forces from hostile territory. Almost immediately after Richard's withdrawal, Saladin, following his recent defeat at Arsuf, saw a chance for revenge and, on the 27 July, laid siege to the town of Jaffa which had served as a base of operations for Richard during his previous march inland towards Jerusalem. The defending garrison, although taken by surprise, fought well before the odds against them proved too great. Saladin's soldiers successfully stormed the walls after three days of bloody clashes; only Jaffa's citadel held out and the remaining Crusaders managed to send word of their plight.

=== Richard storms Jaffa from the sea ===
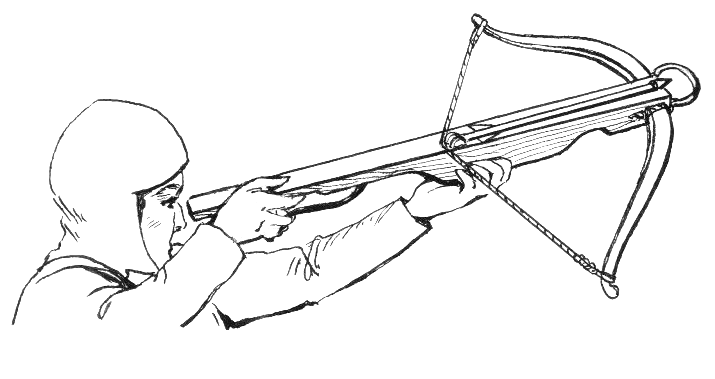
Early Medieval crossbow

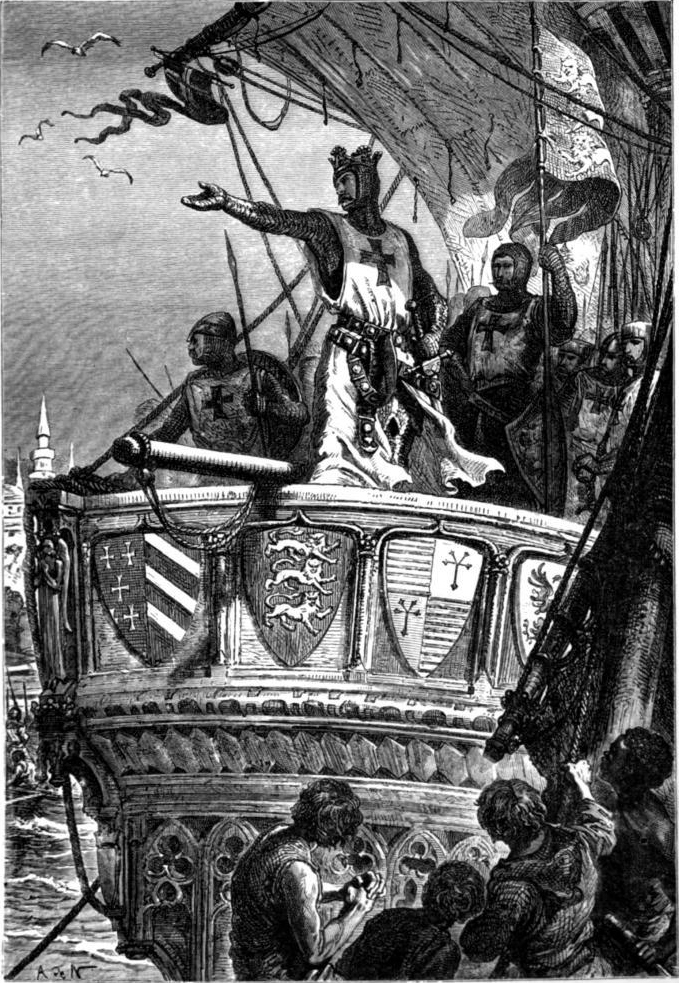
Richard I bidding farewell to the Holy Land. Victorian image

Richard subsequently gathered a small army, including a large contingent of Italian sailors, and hurried south. Upon seeing Muslim banners flying from the walls, he mistakenly believed the town to be a lost cause, until a defender swam out to his flagship and informed him of the citadel's dire situation.

Still in his sailor's deck shoes, Richard leapt into the sea and waded through the waves to reach the beach. The King again showed his personal bravery and martial prowess, leading fifty-four knights, a few hundred infantrymen, and about 2,000 Genoese and Pisan crossbowmen into battle. The Muslim army began to panic at the sudden offensive launched by Richard's newly arrived force; they feared it was just the advanced element of a much larger army coming to relieve Jaffa. The English king fought in person at the forefront of his attack, and Saladin's men were routed. Many of the Christian prisoners who had surrendered earlier also seized their arms and resumed combat, for their captors were in such disarray that they were unable to stop them. Saladin's fleeing army spilled out of Jaffa and escaped in a disorderly manner; Saladin was unable to regroup his forces until they had retreated more than five miles inland.

== Battle – Saladin's counterattack defeated ==
When Saladin received reports that more of the Franks were coming down from Caesarea, he decided to launch a counterattack on Jaffa to recapture it before these additional reinforcements could arrive. On the early morning of August 4, Muslim troops massed around the walled town, concealing themselves in the fields and intending to attack at dawn the next day. Just before sunrise, however, a Genoese soldier out for a stroll discerned the hidden enemy; the neighing of horses and glinting of armour confirmed his suspicions. The sentries promptly raised the alarm, and Richard quickly assembled his knights, infantry and crossbowmen for battle. He ordered his infantry, including unmounted knights, to form a defensive hedge of spears by kneeling and driving their shields and the shafts of their spears or lances into the ground, with the spearheads pointing towards their opponents. The crossbowmen stood behind the protective wall of spearmen, working in pairs, one shooting whilst the other loaded. In front of the infantry, sharp tent pegs were hammered into the ground to help deter horsemen. Richard kept his handful of mounted knights as a reserve in the rear.

The lightly armoured Turkish, Egyptian and Bedouin cavalry repeatedly charged. However, when it was evident that the Crusaders were not going to break ranks, they veered away from the spears without coming to blows. Each Ayyubid attack lost heavily to the barrage of missiles from the many crossbows. The armour of the Franks proved better able to withstand the arrows of the Saracens than the armour of the Saracens could withstand crossbow bolts. Also, being entirely cavalry, the many horses of Saladin's force were particularly vulnerable to missile fire. After a few hours' onslaught, both sides began to tire. Having suffered considerably from the barrage of crossbow bolts without having been able to dent the Crusaders' defences, Saladin's cavalrymen were in a demoralised state and their mounts were exhausted. They were put to flight by a charge of the knights, only 10 to 15 of whom were mounted, and spearmen led by the king himself.

While the battle raged, a group of Ayyubid soldiers were able to outflank the Crusader army and enter Jaffa. The Genoese marines who had been entrusted with guarding the gates offered little resistance before retreating to their ships. Before the Muslims could exploit their success, however, Richard himself galloped into the town and rallied all of its fighting men. By evening, it had become clear to Saladin that his men had been soundly defeated and he gave the order to withdraw. Baha' al-Din, a contemporary Muslim soldier and historian, recorded: “I have been assured … that on that day the king of England, lance in hand, rode along the whole length of our army from right to left, and not one of our soldiers left the ranks to attack him. The Sultan was wroth thereat and left the battlefield in anger…” Saladin's forces had suffered 700 dead, and lost 1500 horses; the Crusaders lost 2 dead, though many were wounded. However, as for many Medieval battles, the recorded figures for losses may not be entirely reliable. Leaving their dead on the field, the Ayyubid force began a long, weary, march back to Jerusalem. Once back in the city Saladin strengthened its defences in case Richard were to advance against it again.

== Aftermath ==
The repulse from Jaffa marked the end of Saladin's counter-offensive. Both sides were completely exhausted, and Palestine was in a ruinous state. Soon after the fighting at Jaffa Richard fell seriously ill. A three-year truce was negotiated, Ascalon had its defences razed and was handed back to Saladin, from Tyre to Jaffa the coast was to remain in Christian hands. Saladin retained Jerusalem, but Christian pilgrims would be free to visit the city. The retention of Jaffa allowed the Crusader kingdom to reconsolidate its control of the coastal lands of Palestine from its new capital at Acre.

== Bibliography ==
=== Primary sources ===
- Itinerarium Regis Ricardi Anonymous translation of Itinerarium Regis Ricardi, trans. In parentheses Publications, Cambridge, Ontario 2001

=== Secondary sources ===
- Gillingham, John (1978). Richard the Lionheart. London: Weidenfeld & Nicolson. ISBN 0-297-77453-0.
- Oman, Charles William Chadwick. (1924) A History of the Art of War in the Middle Ages Vol. I, 378–1278 AD. London: Greenhill Books; Mechanicsburg, Pennsylvania: Stackpole Books, reprinted in 1998.
- Runciman, Steven (13 December 1987). A History of the Crusades: The Kingdom of Acre and the Later Crusades. Vol. III. CUP Archive. p. 542. ISBN 9780521347723. JSTOR 1845592.
- Stevenson, William Barron (1907). The Crusaders in the East: A Brief History of the Wars of Islam with the Latins in Syria During the Twelfth and Thirteenth Centuries. Cambridge University Press. p. 413. OCLC 3261335.
- Verbruggen, J.F. (1997). The Art of Warfare in Western Europe During the Middle Ages: From the Eighth Century to 1340. Boydell & Brewer. p. 388. ISBN 9780851155708.
