= Gerard Geldenhouwer =

Dutch historian (1482–1542)

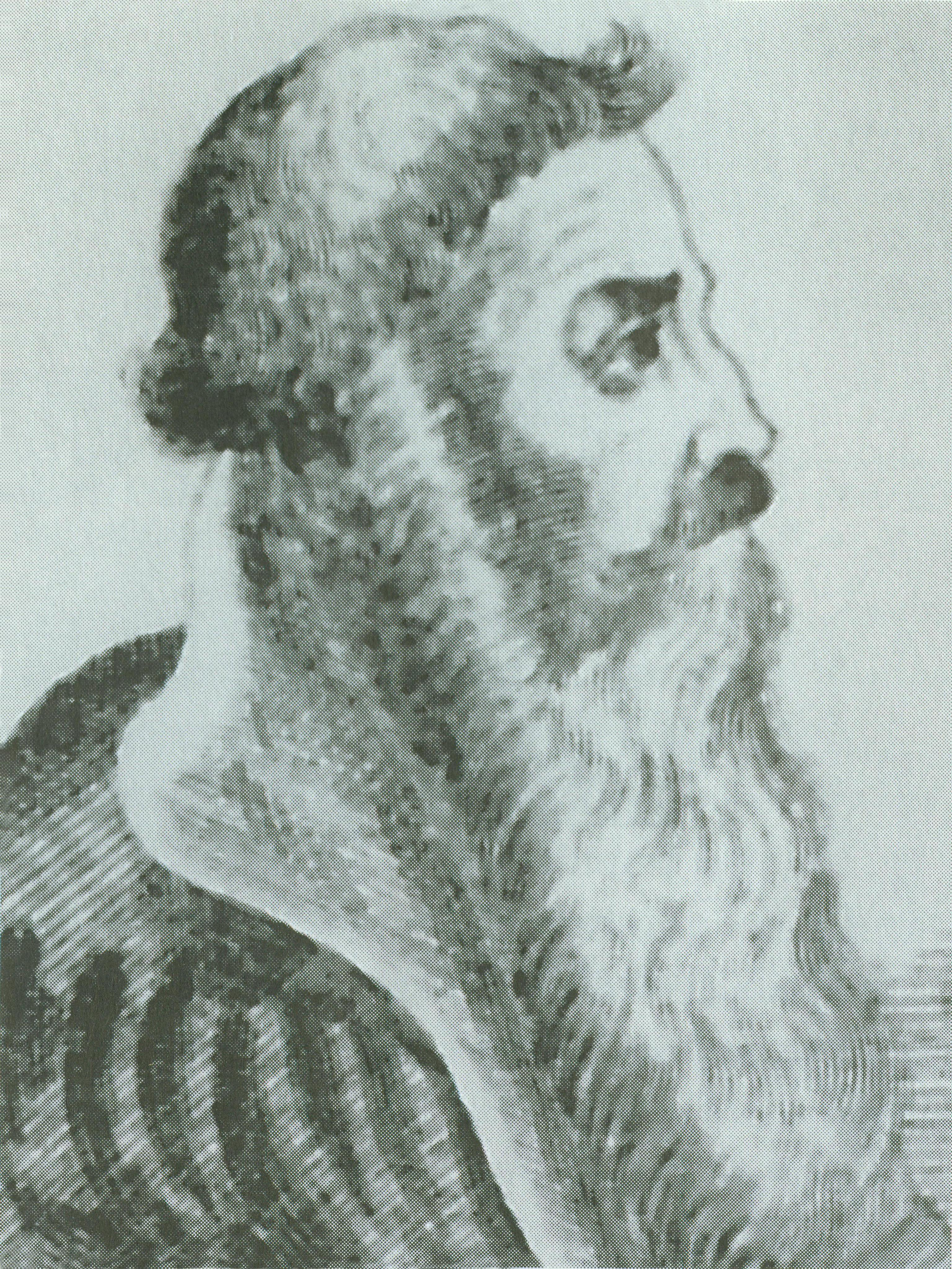
Gerard Geldenhouwer

Gerardus Geldenhouwer (1482 – 10 January 1542) was a Dutch historian and Protestant reformer.

Geldenhouwer descended from a patrician family of Nijmegen, where he was born. His father, also named Gerard, was chamberservant at the court of Arnold of Egmond and Adolf of Egmond, dukes of Guelders. He followed an education at the Latin school in Deventer, before he joined the Augustinians. After this he studied at Leuven. Here he wrote his first publications, amongst which are a collection of Satires in the trend of Erasmus' Praise of Folly. In this period he also oversaw the printing of several works of Erasmus and Thomas More.

Between 1515 and 1524 he was in service of Philip of Burgundy. This illegitimate son of Philip the Good was first Admiral of Flanders and later bishop of Utrecht. In Utrecht, Geldenhouwer came into contact with the protestantism of Luther. After Philip's death, he travelled through the Low Countries and Germany, and visited amongst others the city of Wittenberg to hear Luther. In 1526 he left the Augustinians and married.

Six years later he became Professor at the newly founded Lutheran University of Marburg, first as professor of history and later as professor of theology, specializing in the New Testament. Geldenhouwer has earned a place amongst history writers with, amongst others, two studies on the history of the Batavians and their historical importance for the Duchy of Guelders and the city of Nijmegen.

Gerard died in Marburg on 10 January 1542, probably from the plague.

== Publications ==
- Lucubratiuncula de Batavorum insula (1520)
- Historia Batavica (1530)
