= Dirk Martens =

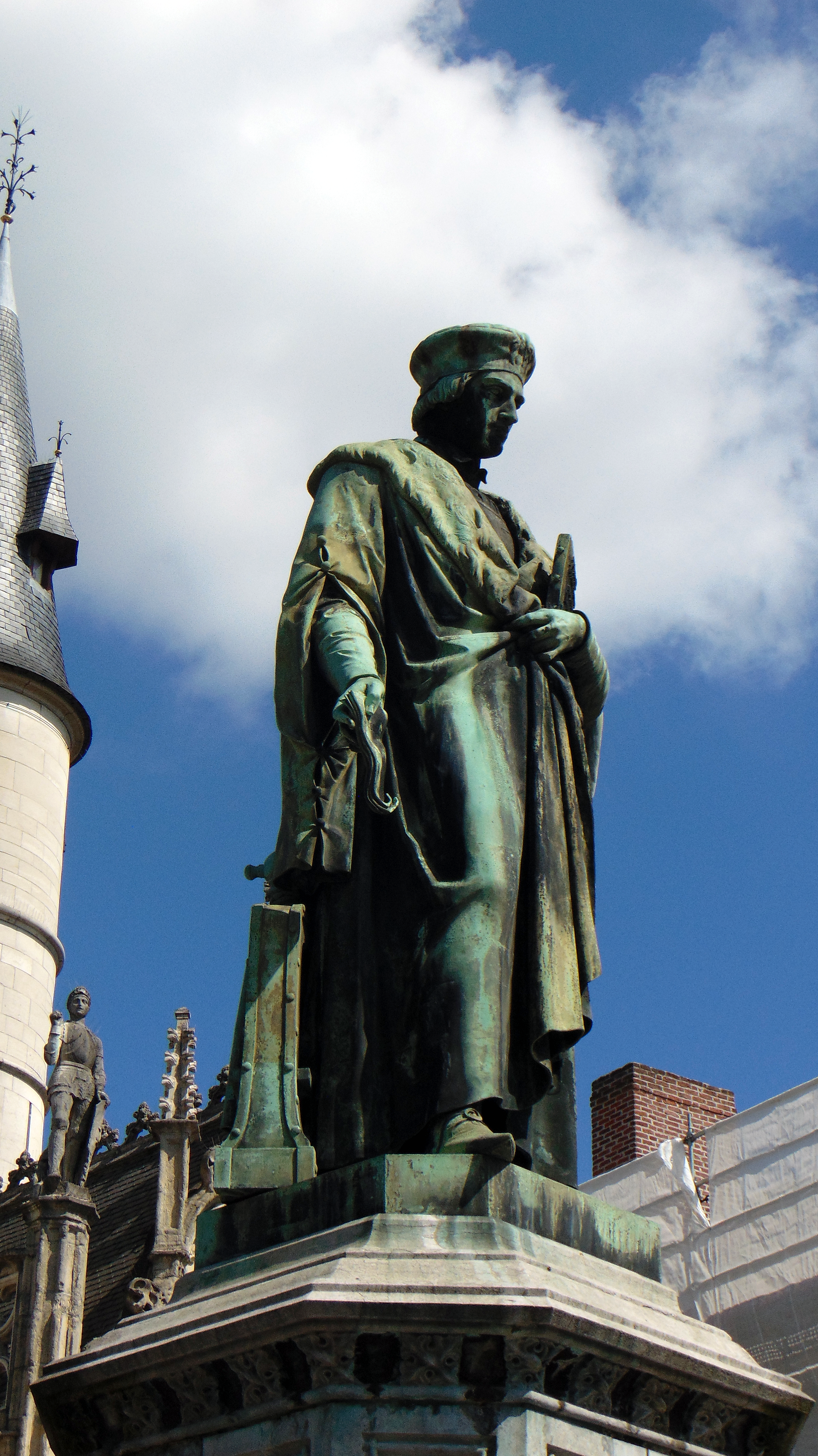
- Portrait of Dirk Martens in Aalst
- Born: Dirk Martens c. 1446; Aalst, County of Flanders, Belgium
- Died: 28 May 1534; Aalst, County of Flanders, Belgium
- Occupation: Publisher

Dirk Martens (Latin: Theodoricus Martinus) (1446 or 1447 – 28 May 1534) was a printer and editor in the County of Flanders. He published over fifty books by Erasmus and the very first edition of Thomas More's Utopia. He was the first to print Greek and Hebrew characters in the Netherlands. In 1856 a statue of Martens was erected on the main square of the town of his birth, Aalst.

== Biography ==
Dirk Martens was born in Aalst to Joos Martens and Johanna de Proost. He had two sisters, Johanna and Margaretha. His family had long lived in Aalst. He was also related to the family of Pieter Coecke van Aalst, artist and member of one of the most prominent families of Aalst. While the date of birth of Martens is not known, it is presumed to be in 1446 or 1447. Most information on Martens was lost in 1582, when the Aalst monastery of the Hermits of Saint William, which had received the library of Martens after his death, burned down. It was here that he presumably received his education, and here as well that he spent his last years.

At an unknown date, probably around 1471, he went to Venice, where he worked with the humanist Gerardus de Lisa (circa 1430-1499), from Ghent. Here Martens learned the art of printing. In 1473 he returned to Aalst and together with Johan van Westfalen started a printing press. The partnership ended in May 1474, when Martens became the only printer working in Aalst. He printed a book on the two lovers of Enea Piccolomini who later became Pope Pius II.

Shortly thereafter there is a gap in the biography of Martens, lasting until 1486. It has been postulated that he went to Spain and may be the same as a certain Teodorico Aleman, a printer in Sevilla in 1477 and in Murcia in 1478. By 1486 or 1487 Martens was again active as a printer of religious works in Aalst, where he remained active until 1492. His 1491 edition of the Doctrinale by Alexander de Villa Dei was the first printed book in the Netherlands to include Greek characters.

In 1493 he moved to Antwerp and took over the printing press of Gerard Leeu. He remained here until May 1497. In this period, he seems to have had connections with the imperial court at Brussels. He then moved to Leuven, setting up press across the street from the University Hall in June 1497. He returned to Antwerp from 1502 until 1512 before returning to Leuven for the remainder of his professional career. His son Pieter Martens took over the press in June 1524 but died a few months later: Dirk then resumed his work for another five years, until presumably 1529, when he was around 82 or 83 years old. He then moved back to Aalst where he died on 28 May 1534, c. 88 years old. All his children had died by then as well. His epitaph, composed by Erasmus in 1527, was placed above his tomb in the convent church, from where it was removed to the Saint-Martin church of Aalst in 1784.

== Work ==
He published many humanistic works, including over fifty books by Erasmus and the very first edition of Thomas More's Utopia in 1516. He was the first to print Greek (in 1491) and Hebrew (in 1518) characters in the Netherlands.

The first edition of Utopia appeared in late December 1516. It was a quarto volume of some 400 pages (54 folios), including the titlepage, some blank pages, a woodcut (as requested by More) and several notes and letters by other humanists from the circle of Martens, including Pieter Gillis and Gerard Geldenhouwer. Though no other Martens' editions are known, the book was an immediate success and was reprinted in 1517 in Paris, in 1518 in Basel and in 1519 in Florence. It was first given to Martens to print as the result of the friendship with Erasmus; More had sent the manuscript to Erasmus with instructions to find him a publisher, and Erasmus logically thought of his usual publisher, Martens.

Martens was a friend of some of the most famous humanists of his time. Desiderius Erasmus, who fell ill after a trip to Basel in 1518, spent four weeks in the house of Martens to recover, even though he had been diagnosed with the plague by two doctors.

People working for Dirk Martens included Pierre Barbier, friend and correspondent of Erasmus, Pieter Gillis (to whom More dedicated the Utopia), between 1515 and 1518 Rutgerus Rescius, Hadrianus Barlandus, and between 1514 and 1516 Gerard Geldenhouwer, a humanist author who collaborated on the publication of More's Utopia and some of the works of Erasmus.

== Legacy ==
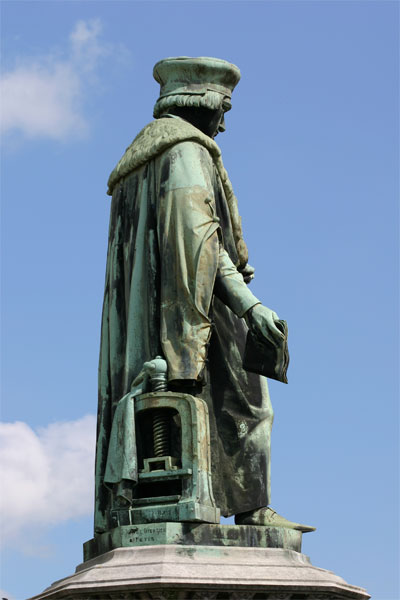
Statue of Martens at Aalst

Rutgerus Rescius started his printing press in Leuven at the time that Martens stopped working in 1529; but the true heir to the Martens printing press was Servaas van Sassen or Servatius Sassenus, a printer from Diest who married Dirk Martens' daughter Barbara and continued his press until 1557. Three sons of Van Sassen continued the work afterwards. Van Sassen printed at least 25 Latin works before 1540, including a 1536 eulogy on the death of Thomas More by Johannes Secundus.

The importance of Martens' work, especially his publications in Antwerp and Leuven, his role in the humanistic movement, and his contributions to the study of Greek and Hebrew, has been compared to the role Christoffel Plantijn played in Antwerp at the end of the 16th century.

A statue of Martens was erected on the main square of Aalst in 1856. While there are other contenders for the title, he is often considered to be the first printer in Flanders, and 500 years after he first published a book two commemorative exhibitions were held, one by the Royal Library of Belgium in Brussels and one in his hometown Aalst.

== Publications ==
Martens published many works over his extensive career, spanning more than 50 years. Below is a selection of works known to have been published by Martens.

=== Aalst ===
- Dionysius the Carthusian, Speculum conversionis peccatorum; 1473 (presumably the first book published by Martens together with John of Westphalia)
- Pseudo-Augustine, Manuale de salutate sive de aspiratione animae ad Deum; 1473
- Enea Silvio Piccolomini, Historia de duobus amantibus; 1474 (presumably the last book published by Martens together with John of Westphalia)
- Baptista Mantuanus, De Vita Beata; 1474 (the first known book printed by Martens on his own)
- Alexander de Villa Dei, Doctrinale; 1491

=== Antwerp ===
- Cristopher Columbus, Epistola de insulis nuper inventis; 1493
- Desiderius Erasmus, Lucubratiunculae; 1503 (reprinted 1509; reprinted 1514 together with poems by Grapheus, see below)
- Erasmus, Panegyricus; 1504
- Rudolf Agricola, Opuscula nonnulla; 1511
- Erasmus, Laus stultitiae sive Moriae encomium; 1512 (reprint of the original 1511 edition)

=== Leuven ===
- Erasmus, Lucianus; 1512 (reprint 1516)
- Erasmus, De ratione studii coupled with Guilielmus Goudanus, Odae; 1512
- Plutarchus, De tuenda bona valetudine (translated by Erasmus); 1513
- Lucian, De luctu (translated by Erasmus); 1513
- Hadrianus Barlandus, Fabulae; 1513 (second edition)
- Cornelius Grapheus, Poems, together with Erasmi Lucubratiunculae aliquot; 1514
- Virgil, Versuum ex Bucolicis Vergilii proverbialium collectanea; 1514
- Erasmus, De constructione octo partium libellus; 1514 (July, second edition November, third edition 1516)
- Gaza (translated by Erasmus), Grammaticae Institutiones Liber; 1516
- Erasmus, Institutiones principes christiani; 1516 (two printings in August 1516)
- Erasmus, De octo partium orationis; 1516
- Erasmus, Epistolae aliquot selectae ex Erasmicis; 1516 (reprinted 1520: an anthology of his letters made at the request of Martens by Barlandus, and aimed specifically at students)
- Publio Fausto Andrelini, Epistolae proverbialis et morales; 1516
- Gerard Geldenhouwer, Pompa exequiarum Catholici Hispanorum regis Ferdinandi; 1516
- Thomas More, Utopia, first edition; 1516
- Erasmus, Epistoles elegantes; 1517
- Geldenhouwer, De ingressu Philippi de Burgundia in ditionem suam; 1517
- Erasmus, Familiarium Colloquiorum Formulae; March 1519 (amended edition; first edition authorized by Erasmus, with a new preface by him; further amended edition October 1519)
- Dictionarium Hebraicum; 1520
- Adrien Amerot, Compendium graecae grammatices, 1521
- Barlandus, Adagiorum epitome; 1521
- Erasmus, Progymnasmata quaedam primae adolescentiae; 1521
- Gillis van Delft, Conclusiones in Sententias Magistri; no date
- Clenardus, Tabula in grammaticen hebraeam; 1529 (Martens' last known book)
