= Theoderic Rood =

Printer of incunabula at Oxford, England

Theoderic (Theodoric or Theodericus) Rood was a printer of incunabula at Oxford, England. His activities in the city can be dated with any certainty only to the years 1481 and 1482, but probably extend between around 1481 and 1484. Several earlier printed books, dating from 1478 and 1479, and an edition of John Mirk's Liber festivalis of 1486 or 1487, which were once attributed to Rood's press are now thought to be the work of other, as yet unidentified, printers.

== Life and work ==
Rood came to Oxford from Cologne, bringing types (and possibly a press) with him. Once established in Oxford, he forged links with the University and printed a number of academic works in Latin, including John Anwykyll's Compendium totius grammaticae of around 1483 (known only from a single fragmentary copy at the Bodleian Library).

E. Gordon Duff lists thirteen surviving editions printed by Rood. Among these books, only two are dated, the earlier being Alexander of Hales' Expositio super libros Aristotelis de anima, which bears a colophon date of 11 October 1481, and the later John Lathbury's Liber moralium super threnis Ieremiae dated 31 July 1482. The other surviving editions are undated, but have been ascribed dates between 1481 and, tentatively, 1484 by Duff and Hellinga.
