= John of Westphalia =

John of Westphalia, also known as John of Paderborn, Johann von Westphalen and other spelling variations of Johannes, Paderborn and Westfalia (died 1498), was the first printer in Leuven and possibly in Flanders. He was born in Paderborn or Aachen and seems to have been first active in Venice, but returned to Germany and studied at the university of Cologne before moving to Flanders as a printer. He was active from 1473 in Aalst, working together with Dirk Martens on four books, and from 1474 in Leuven. He worked there in the university until 1498, producing at least 180 books. On his death in 1498, Dirk Martens bought his shop and settled in Leuven. John's brother Conrad of Westphalia was also a printer.

== Works ==
Some of his works are:

- 1473: Gesta Romanorum
- 1474: Antonius Guainerius, Commentariolus de pleuresi
- 1474: Pedrus de Crescentiis, Liber ruralium commodorum
- 1475: Justinian
- 1475: Cicero, Brutus
- 1475: Leonardo Bruni, Ethica
- 1477 (estimated): "Vocabularius copiosus et singularis vnus ex diuersis diligentissime theutonicatus" (contributed the preface)
- 1475-1476: Virgil
- 1480: Guido delle Colonne, Historia destructionis Troiae
- 1483: Agricola, Axiochos
- 1483: Cicero, De officiis
