= Arend de Keysere =

Arend de Keysere (Arnoldus cesaris, Arnoul de Keysere) ( ? - Ghent, 1490) was a Flemish masterprinter of incunabula. De Keysere, who very probably was trained as a printer in France, started printing in Oudenaarde in 1480. Shortly afterwards, in 1483, he established himself as a printer in Ghent where he stayed until his death in 1490. De Keyser edited 33 publications : 13 letters of indulgence, 9 theological works and 5 official publications; 23 of them were in Latin, 8 in Dutch and 3 in French. Two of them have remarkable woodcuts.

== Sources ==
- Meester Arend de Keysere, 1480 - 1490 : Dirk Martens-Jaar / J. Machiels. - Gelegenheidsuitg., 1973, 215 p.

== See also ==
- Dirk Martens
- Christoffel Plantijn
