= Dittionario giorgiano e italiano =

1629 Georgian-Italian dictionary

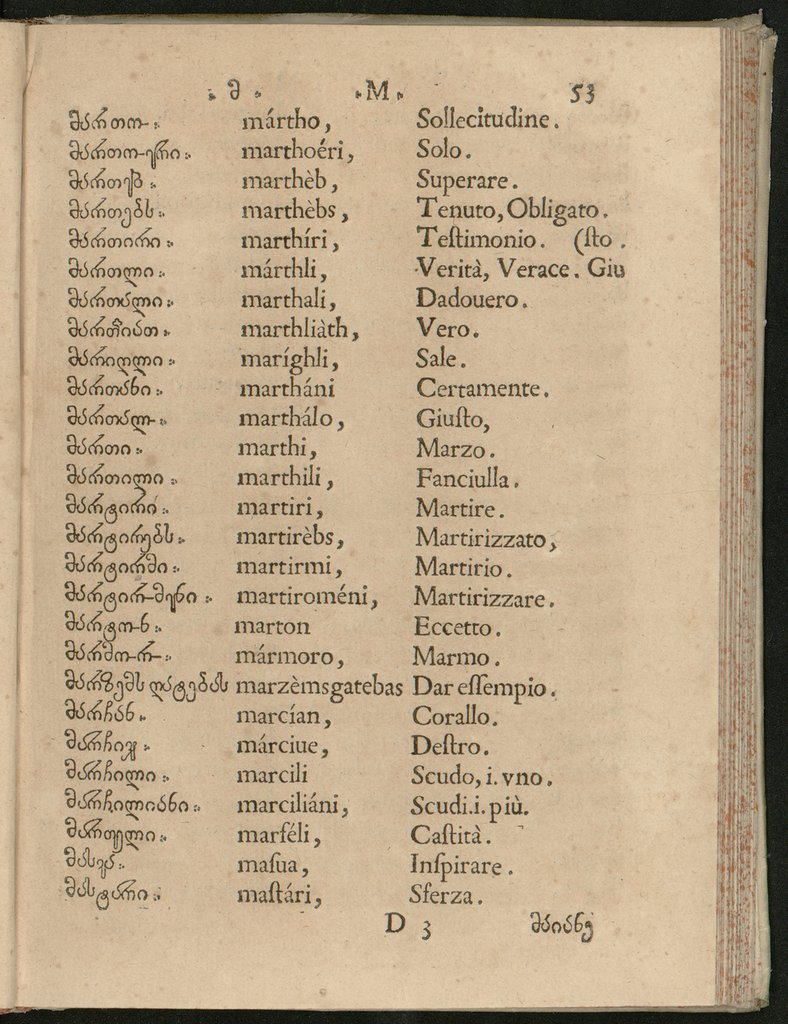
One of the pages of the dictionary

Dittionario giorgiano e italiano is a dictionary in the Georgian language and Italian language. It was printed in Rome, Italy in 1629 by Stefano Paolini along with the then Georgian ambassador Niceforo Irbachi Giorgiano. It was the first book printed in Georgian using movable type. It was primarily meant to help missionaries learn the Georgian language and promote Catholicism in Georgia.

The book was the inaugural publication of a printing house close to Angelicum University and above Trajan's Market, where it remained in use by Propaganda Fide until 1870. A bilingual Georgian-Italian commemorative plaque was installed jointly in 2011 by the Roman municipality and the Georgian embassy in Rome.
