= Edward Raban (printer) =

Edward Raban (died 1658) was an English soldier in the Eighty Years War and Anglo-Spanish War, who became a printer chiefly associated with Aberdeen, Scotland. Raban may have been involved in the publication of the Perth Assembly, a controversial book opposing religious reforms of James VI.

== Biography ==
Edward Raban is best known as a printer, arriving in Aberdeen in 1622 and remaining there until his death. Details of his life are sparse. His place of birth appears to be in England, perhaps in 1579, and he has been supposed to be a native of Worcestershire, based on his writings in Rabans Resolution against Drunkennesse, printed in 1622, in which he speaks of his "father's brother, Peter Raban, a parson at Meltonmowbre in Wooster-shyre." A contemporary appraisal of Raban's life notes that "This is incorrect as Melton Mowbray is in Leicestershire and not Worcestershire, and no Raban was ever vicar there. However, a gentleman called ‘Raven’ was briefly curate at Keysham Chapel in Leicestershire." His ancestry may be German, based on a longform version of his name as sometimes published: "Edward Rabanus, Anglo Britannus, Gente Germanus" and his self-ifentification as originating from the same country as Pope Joan.

In 1600 Raban set off, along with a number of "bankrout merchands and run-away prentizes", to serve with the army in the Netherlands. He was a soldier in the Eighty Years' War and the Anglo-Spanish War for some ten years, including fighting at the Battle of Nieuwpoort in July 1600 and after that time seems to have travelled over a considerable portion of the continent of Europe, and learnt his trade as a printer, including at Leiden and Amsterdam from as early as 1607.

Circumstantially it appears Raban may have been involved in the publication of the Perth Assembly, a criticism of the James VI and I's Five Articles of Perth, which offended the monarch and provided impetus to the departure of the Pilgrim Fathers in the Mayflower.

Although the Dictionary of National Biography first places him in as a printer in Edinburgh in 1620, at the sign of the A. B. C., in a house at the Cowgate Port, where he printed only one book, contemporary research identifies that he had returned to Edinburgh by 1616 and was associated with Andro Hart, a Scottish printer, publisher, and bookseller in Edinburgh.

In 1620 he appears at St. Andrews, where he opened a shop with his old sign of the A. B. C., and where he was appointed printer to the University of St Andrews. In 1621 he executed some work for Dr. Robert Baron, who, according to Edmond, in all likelihood exercised considerable influence in bringing about Raban's removal to Aberdeen in 1622.

It is uncertain whether the authorities of the Town or of the university first invited Raban to settle in Aberdeen. Robert Baron is said to have had much influence with both the university and City authorities; but Bishop Patrick Forbes, a prelate, enlightened and learned in advance of his day must also have been a very active agent in the transaction. Certainly, in Aberdeen he met with considerable encouragement from the authorities, including his appointment, on 22 November 1622, as printer to the Town Council on an annual salary of £40, and also from Bishop Forbes, who remained through life his firm friend. The house he occupied was on the north side of Castle Street, with the sign of ‘The Townes Armes.’ From 1622 to 1645 he printed continuously, issuing, besides a number of academic productions, a number of Scottish books.

In 1649 his last book appeared, and in the following year his successor, James Brown, was appointed. According to the Dictionary of National Biography, former writers, as a rule, have given 1649 as the date of his death, but this matter has been definitely settled by the discovery of the entry of his burial, ‘1658, Dec. 6, Edward Rabein, at Wast dyk.’ Raban was twice married: first, to Janet Johnston, who died in 1627; and, secondly, to Janet Ailhous.
