= Ben Moses (disambiguation) =

Ben Moses (born 1948) is an American documentarian, television producer, director, writer, and filmmaker

Ben Moses may also refer to:

- Aaron ben Moses ben Asher
- Aaron ben Moses Mosessohn
- Aaron ben Moses Teomim
- Aaron HaLevi ben Moses of Staroselye
- Aaron Samuel ben Moses Shalom of Kremenets
- Aaron Selig ben Moses of Zolkiev
- Abba Mari ben Moses
- Abraham ben Moses Maimon
- Abraham ben Moses Schedel
- Abraham Jekuthiel Salman ben Moses Joseph Lichtstein
- Akiba ben Moses Guens
- Aryeh Leib ben Moses Zuenz
- Bahiel ben Moses
- Benjamin ben Moses Nahawendi
- Elijah ben Moses Abba Delmedigo
- Elijah ben Moses Gershon Zahalon
- Eliyah ben Moses Adeni
- Hagin ben Moses
- Hanoch ben Moses
- Isaac ben Moses (disambiguation), multiple persons
- Israel ben Moses ha-Levi Zamosz
- Israel ben Moses Najara
- Jacob ben Moses di Algaba
- Jacob ben Moses Bachrach
- Jacob ben Moses Mölln
- Judah ben Moses Gedaliah
- Judah ben Moses Romano
- Judah Leon ben Moses Mosconi
- Löb ben Moses Minden
- Michael ben Moses Kohen
- Nathan ben Moses Hannover
- Peter ben Moses Smolenskin
- Sar Shalom ben Moses
- Solomon Bahiel ben Moses
- Solomon ben Moses Chelm

== See also ==
- Moses (disambiguation)
- Ben Moshe
