= Ben-Moshe =

Ben Moshe or Ben-Moshe is a Hebrew patronymic or a surname literally meaning "son of Moshe". Notable people with the name include:

== Surname ==
- Danny Ben-Moshe
- Eyal ben-Moshe (Eyal B)
- Liat Ben-Moshe
- Moti Ben-Moshe
- Yael Ron Ben-Moshe
- Yakir Ben Moshe

== Patronymic ==
- Chanoch ben Moshe
- Elazar ben Moshe Azikri
- Eliyahu ben Moshe Gershon
- Menahem ben Moshe Bavli
- Yaakov ben Moshe Levi Moelin
- Yehuda ben Moshe ha-Kohen
- Yisrael ben Moshe Najarah
- Yom Tov ben Moshe Tzahalon
- Yosef Ben Moshe Babad

== See also ==
- Moshe (disambiguation)
- Ben Moses (disambiguation)
