= Judah Gedalia =

Rabbi Judah Gedalia
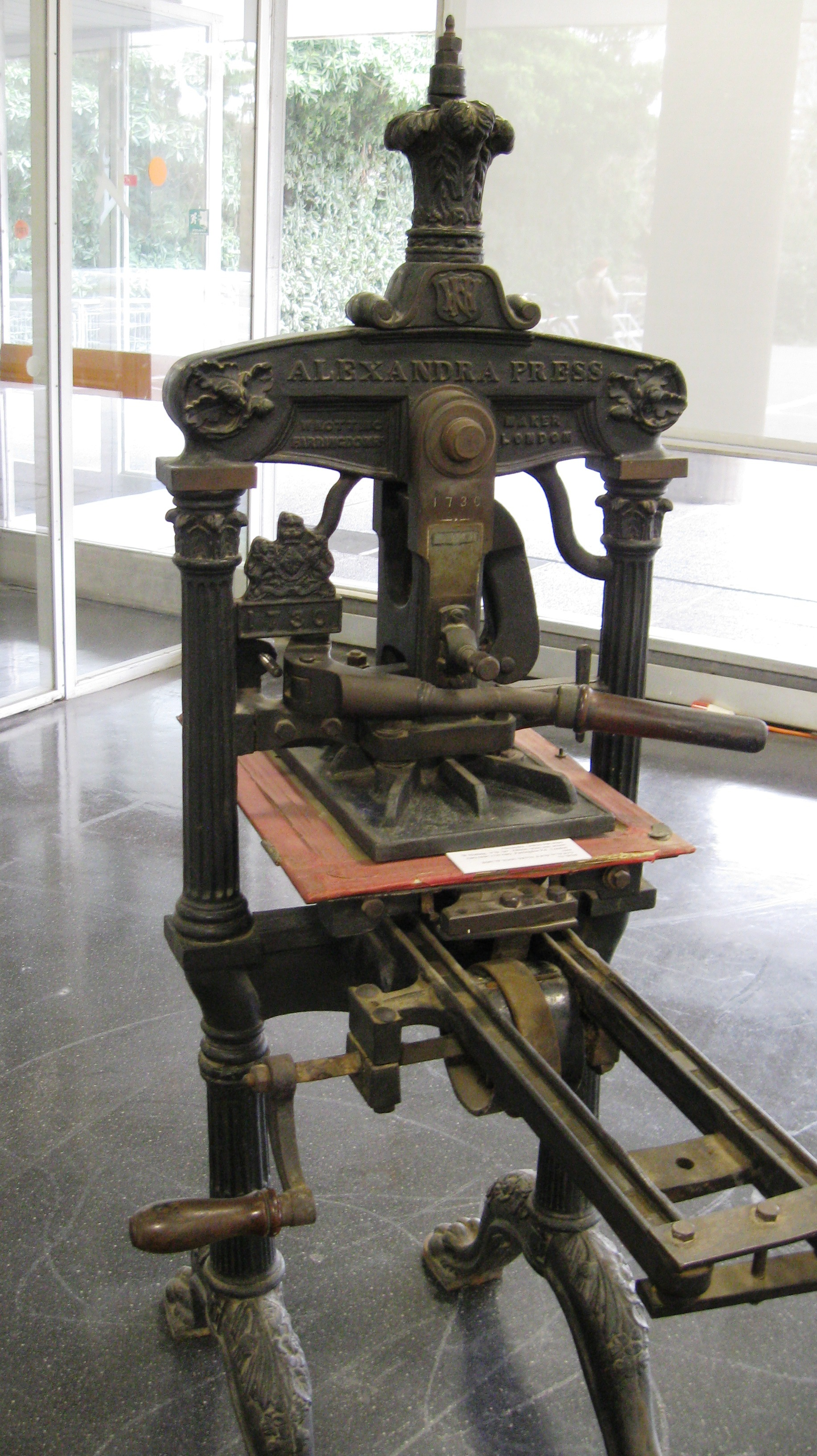
- Antique printing press, now at the National Library, Jerusalem
- Born: 15th century Lisbon
- Died: 1526
- Known for: Printing

Rabbi Judah Gedalia (Hebrew ר' יהודה גדליה) (also spelled Guedalia or Gedaliah) was a Portuguese Sephardi Jew who was a rabbinic scholar and a printer. Born in Lisbon in the 15th century, he moved to Salonica after the expulsion. Gedalia died about 1526 in Salonica. His printing press was continued by his children and produced some thirty works.

== Biography ==
Rabbi Judah Gedalia was the son of Moshe Gedalia. While in Lisbon, Gedalia was engaged as the foreman in the Eliezer Toledano Hebrew printing-house press, between the years 1489-95 until the expulsion in 1497. Driven out of Portugal, he settled in Salonica, and about 1504 set up the first Hebrew printing press established in that city, using the type which he had taken with him from Lisbon. One of the first works printed was the "En Ya'aḳob" of Jacob ibn Ḥabib, whom Gedalia held in high esteem.

Judah Gedalia brought type fonts with him from Portugal, with which he began to print the Talmud (1519–1523). In this edition Rashi's commentary are included, but not the Tosafot. The Gemara is in square type and the commentary in Portuguese Rashi lettering, apart from the tractate Rosh Hashana of which the Gemara and the commentary are in Rashi type. This tractate was not printed in Salonica but in Fez.

Rabbi Yaakov ibn Habib testifies in his introduction to Ein Yaakov. He speaks of the highly important and valuable quality of printing found in the Gedalia printing press:

"A worthy and reputable artist, elderly, of a kindly disposition and trustworthy, is this eminent and wise man, the honorable Rabbi Yehuda Guedalia - may the Lord protect him and give him long life. I knew him in his earlier days in Lisbon at the home of the eminent and humble sage - the honorable Rabbi Eliezer Toledano, of blessed memory, who was like a son and brother to him. Gedalia took charge of the holy work which was done at Toledano's house. After reaching this city Gedalia expended much money to accomplish this work to perfection with great effort, and his sons and other members of his household devoted themselves wholeheartedly to this work"

Judah Gedalia was noted as being a scholar and very knowledgeable with regard to the lettering and proofing. His high quality proofing work is noted during his lifetime as well as in the present day. In 1697 Rabbi Naftali Ashkenazi wrote of Gedalia in his book "Zohar and the Hidden Midrash":

"Who spent his entire life engaged in the work of Heaven to study, teach and proof his books, and to build upon them with fine grammar"

== Selected list of books printed by Gedalia while working at the Eliezer Toledano Printing Press in Lisbon ==
- Nahmanides, Pentateuch, 17 Av. 5249, July 1489
- Abudarham, Commentary on the book of prayer, November 25, 1489
- Yaakov ben Asher, Tur Orah Hayyim, 1490
- Pentateuch with Onkelos, etc., July 1491
- Isaiah and Jeremiah with Kimhi, 1492

== Selected list of books printed by the Gedalia Printing Press in Salonica ==
- "En Ya'aḳob" of Jacob ibn Ḥabib. The first two sedarim were published in 1516, but the author died before completing all six sedarim. His son Levi Ben Habib completed the publication
- The Talmud, printed in 1519-1523
- Pentateuch, 1520
- "Aḳedat Yiẓḥaḳ" by Isaac ben Moses Arama, 1522
- "Meir Job" by Rabbi Meir Arama
- "Arba Turim" by R. Ya'akov Ben Asher, before 1540
- "Ot Emet" by Meir Benveniste, 1565
- "Mashmia'a Yeshua'a" (The Song of Salvation) by Isaac Abarbanel (first edition), 1595

== See also ==
- Hebrew incunabula
- Early editions of the Hebrew Bible
