= Moshe (surname) =

Moshe is a surname. Notable people with the surname include:

- Asi Moshe, Israel poker player
- Barak Moshe (born 1991), Israeli footballer
- Itsik Moshe (born 1959), Israeli social activist
- Hagit Moshe (born 1971), Israeli politician
- Haim Moshe (born 1955), Israeli singer
- Jared Moshe, American director, screenwriter and producer of independent films
- Mikaella Moshe (born 2003), Israeli Olympic archer

== See also ==
- Moses (surname)
- Ben-Moshe
