= Isaac ben Moses =

Isaac ben Moses can refer to:

- Isaac ben Moses Abulafia
- Isaac ben Moses Arama
- Isaac ben Moses Eli
- Isaac ben Moses ha-Levi or Profiat Duran (c. 1350 – 1415), physician and philosopher
- Isaac ben Moses of Vienna (c. 1200–70), Viennese rabbi
- Isaac ben Moses Solomon Blaser
