= Moshe (disambiguation) =

Moshe (Hebrew: משה) is the Hebrew version of the masculine given name Moses.

Moshe may also refer to:

- Moshe (surname)
- Ras Moshe, American composer, multi-instrumentalist specializing in saxophone and flute, musicologist and educator
- Operation Moshe (disambiguation), multiple meanings
- MoSHE, or Ministry of Science and Higher Education (Ethiopia)

== See also ==
- Moshe's, Indian chain of restaurants and cafés
- Moishe
