= Early editions of the Hebrew Bible =

Jewish printers were quick to take advantages of the printing press in publishing the Hebrew Bible. While for synagogue services written scrolls were used (and still are used, as Sifrei Torah are always handwritten), the printing press was very soon called into service to provide copies of the Hebrew Bible for private use. All the editions published before the Complutensian Polyglot were edited by Jews; but afterwards, and because of the increased interest excited in the Bible by the Reformation, the work was taken up by Christian scholars and printers; and the editions published by Jews after this time were largely influenced by these Christian publications. It is not possible in the present article to enumerate all the editions, whole or partial, of the Hebrew text. This account is devoted mainly to the incunabula (many of which were used as manuscripts by Kennicott in gathering his variants).

== First Hebrew presses ==
The first to establish a Hebrew printing-press and to cut Hebrew type (according to Ginsburg) was Abraham ben Hayyim dei Tintori, or Dei Pinti, in 1473. He printed the first Hebrew book in 1474 (Tur Yoreh De'ah). In 1477 there appeared the first printed part of the Bible in an edition of 300 copies. It is not really an edition of a Biblical book, but a reprint of David Kimhi's commentary on Psalms, to which the Biblical text of each verse is added; the text being in square, the commentary in Rabbinic, characters. Each verse is divided off by a sof-pasuk. The first four Psalms have the vowel-points; but the difficulty of printing them seems to have been too great, and they were discontinued. The ketib is replaced by the qere; but the text is badly printed and contains many errors. The Psalms are not numbered, but simply divided, as in the manuscripts, into five books. From the type used it is conjectured that the printing was done at Bologna. The printers were Maestro Joseph, Baria, Hayyim Mordecai, and Hezekiah of Ventura. The Psalms alone seem to have been reprinted before 1480, in Rabbinic characters similar to those used in the 1477 edition; and a third time together with an index of the Psalms and the text of the Birkat ha-Mazon. It is supposed that these two reprints were issued at Rome.

== First edition of the Pentateuch ==
The first edition of the Pentateuch appeared at Bologna on January 26, 1482, with vowel-signs and accents. The rafe sign is liberally employed in the first folios, but later on is discarded. The Targum (along the side) and the commentary of Rashi (at the top and the bottom of the page) are printed with the text. The cost of publication was borne by Joseph ben Abraham Caravita. The publisher was Maestro Abraham ben Hayyim dei Tintori (Dei Pinti) of Pesaro; the corrector, Joseph Hayyim ben Aaron Strassburg, a Frenchman. According to De Rossi, the editor made use of a Spanish manuscript; but Ginsburg believes that German and Franco-German manuscripts were used. A facsimile is given by Simonsen. About the same time, and at Bologna, there appeared an edition of the Five Scrolls, with Rashi above and below the text and with the commentary of Ibn Ezra on Esther. This was followed on October 15, 1485, by an edition of the Former Prophets (without vowels), together with Kimhi's commentary, brought out at Soncino in the duchy of Milan by Joshua Solomon ben Israel Nathan Soncino. That this edition was very carefully printed is attested upon the fly-leaf. The Divine Name is printed יהוה and אלהים. In the following year the Latter Prophets appeared at the same place; though neither date nor printing-office is mentioned in the book itself. The passages in Kimhi dealing with Christianity are not omitted, as is the case in later editions. It was this same printing-house that brought out on February 23, 1488, the first complete edition of the Bible, the text provided with vowels and accents, in two columns to the page. The Pentateuch in this edition is followed by the Five Scrolls. Soncino was aided in the printing by Abraham ben Hayyim dei Tintori, mentioned above. According to De Rossi, German codices were at the basis of this edition.

== Portions of the Bible ==
Prior to this, portions of the Bible were printed at Naples: Proverbs, with a commentary of Immanuel ben Solomon, by Hayyim ben Isaac ha-Levi the German (1486); and in the same year (September 8) Job with the commentary of Levi ben Gerson, Lamentations with that of Joseph Kara, and the rest of the Hagiographa with Rashi. The editor of this last edition was Samuel ben Samuel Romano. This edition was completed with the Psalms (March 28, 1487) with Kimhi's commentary, edited by Joseph ben Jacob the German, and corrected by Jacob Baruch ben Judah Landau. In 1487 (June 30) an edition of the Pentateuch without commentary appeared at Faro in Portugal, upon the basis of Spanish manuscripts, in Spanish-Hebrew characters, with vowel-points—at times incorrectly applied—and with no accents. The expenses for the edition were paid by Don Samuel Gacon. The only copy known is printed on vellum.

In 1490 an edition of the Pentateuch without vowel-points or accents was published by Abraham ben Isaac ben David at Ixar (Hijar) in Spain, together with the Targum Onkelos in small square type and Rashi in Spanish-Rabbinic type; and one of the Psalms was issued at Naples (December 12), together with Proverbs and Job. Another copy of the Pentateuch seems to have been issued at Ixar between 1490 and 1495, together with the Haftarot and the Five Scrolls. It is said by De Rossi to contain the printer's mark of a lion rampant, such as is seen in the other Ixar prints. The printer was Eliezer ben Abraham Alantansi, and it is spoken of as "elegantissima editio". In the year 1491 two editions of the Pentateuch left the press: one at Naples (Soncino), with vowel-points and accents together with Rashi, the Five Scrolls, and the scroll of Antiochus; the other at Lisbon (July–August), with Onkelos and Rashi. The Lisbon copy was edited by David ben Joseph ibn Yahya and Joseph Calphon. It is declared by Le Long and De Rossi, to be the most celebrated and beautiful Hebrew print of the 15th century. The elegant characters are provided with vowels and accents even in the Onkelos, and the raphe-signs are used throughout. It was published in two volumes, probably at the same press from which came the editions of Isaiah and Jeremiah with Kimhi's commentary (1492) and Proverbs with the commentary of David b. Solomon ibn Yahya (c. 1492). From another press in Portugal, at Leiria, were issued, July 25, 1492, Proverbs with Targum and the commentaries of Levi ben Gerson and Menahem Meïri (printed by Samuel d'Ortas), and in 1494 the Former Prophets with Targum and commentaries of Kimhi and Levi b. Gerson.

== Soncino Bibles ==
Gerson ben Moses Soncino established a printing-press also in Brescia, from which there issued a Pentateuch with the Five Scrolls and the Haftarot, January 23, 1492; a second edition of this Pentateuch, November 24, 1493; Psalms, December 16, 1493; and a complete Bible, May 24–31, 1494. This last edition is in most copies merely a reprint of the 1493 edition as regards the Pentateuch; and it is of special interest as being the one used by Luther in making his translation into German. Luther's copy is preserved in the Berlin State Library. Gerson seems to ignore most of the peculiarities of the Masoretic text as laid down; e.g., by Jacob ben Hayyim ibn Adonijah.

== Polyglot Bibles ==
The idea seems to have originated with Origen of Alexandria (c.185-253), who drew up in parallel columns the Hebrew text, its transliteration into Greek, and various other Greek recensions in fifty scrolls or books which were then deposited in the library of Pamphilus at Cæsarea (this Hexapla was preceded by a Tetrapla). The idea was not revived until the 16th century, when the first edition of the Hebrew text by Christians appeared in the Complutensian Polyglot (printed at Alcalá de Henares, 1514–1517, 6 vols.). Renouard believes that the plan originated with Aldus Manutius, who, in the preface to the Psalter of 1497, speaks of the probability of his publishing a Hebrew-Greek and Latin Bible in one. Only the first sheet, however, of this was printed. The honor of being first in the field belongs to Cardinal Ximenes; though among those who helped him were the Marranos Alfonso of Zamora and Paul Nuñez Coronel. The three columns on each page contain the Hebrew, the Septuagint, and the Vulgate. The Targum of Onkelos is added, of which Alfonso made the Latin translation. Ximenes had to cast his own Hebrew type for this work: ḥaṭefs are sparingly used; of the accents, only athnaḥ and sof-pasuḳ. The Masoretic Text divisions are discarded; and the text for the first time is arranged after the model of the Vulgate, the chapter-numbering of which is printed in the margin. By means of a letter, reference is made from each Hebrew word to its Latin equivalent; and the Hebrew roots are also placed on the margin.

The Hebrew text of the Complutensian was repeated in the Antwerp Polyglot (1568–1572, 8 vols.), the editor of which was Arias Montanus, and the printer Christopher Plantin. For printing the Hebrew text Plantin used among others Daniel Bomberg's Hebrew type, which he had received from Bomberg's nephews. This Bible is known also as the Biblia Regia, because Philip II defrayed the expenses. In addition to the texts in the Complutensian, it contains an additional Targum and a number of tracts on lexicographical and grammatical subjects. Only 500 copies were printed, most of which were lost at sea on their way to Spain. The polyglot of Elijah Hutter (Nuremberg, 1599–1601) contains, besides the older versions, a number in modern European languages; and it is peculiar from the fact that the radical letters of the Hebrew text are printed in full characters, and the servile letters in hollow ones. A decided advance is made in the Paris Polyglot (1629–1645, 10 vols.), done at the expense of Michel le Jay. Here the Complutensian and Antwerp polyglots are repeated; but there are added the Syriac and Arabic as well as the Samaritan, Hebrew, and Aramaic versions, and a Latin translation of all the versions. It is also highly prized for its typographical excellence.

=== London Polyglot ===
Still more ambitious than the Paris was the London Polyglot edited by Brian Walton (1654–1657, 6 vols., and Lexicon Heptaglotton, 1669, 2 vols.). The first four volumes contain the Old Testament, where, in addition to the Hebrew, the following texts are to be found: Samaritan-Hebrew, Samaritan-Aramaic, Septuagint with readings of the Codex Alexandrinus, Old Latin, Vulgate, Syriac, Arabic, Targum Onḳelos, Pseudo-Jonathan and Jerusalem Targums, Targum Jonathan and Targum of the Hagiographa, Ethiopic and Persian in varying completeness. All of these were accompanied by Latin translations. This polyglot was the second book in England to be published by subscription. It was originally dedicated to Cromwell; but as he died during the printing, it was finally dedicated to Charles II. A few copies, however, left the press before the change was made; and these are called "Republican" copies, to distinguish them from the "Royal" ones.

The polyglot of Christian Reineccius (Leipzig, 1750, 3 vols.), which contains the Hebrew (with Masoretic notes), the Greek, Latin, and Luther's German version; that of E. Hutter (Hamburg, 1599), of which only the Pentateuch, Joshua, Judges, and Ruth were published; and that of S. Bagster (London, 1821), in which the Hebrew text is that of Van der Hooght, the Samaritan that of Kennicott, need no further mention. The Heidelberg or Bertram's polyglot (ex-officina Sanct-Andreana, 1586; Commeliana, 1599, 1616, 3 vols.), Hebrew, Greek, and Latin, is based on the Complutensian text. Polyglot Psalters containing the Hebrew text were published at Saint-Germain-des-Prés in 1509 and 1513 by the elder Henry Stephen, at Genoa in 1516 by Agostino Justinian, and at Cologne in 1518 by Johannes Potken. Two Jewish polyglots of the Pentateuch were issued at Constantinople in 1546 and 1547. Beside the text and the Targum the first contained translations in Persian and Arabic, the second, in Neo-Greek and Spanish. The most recent polyglots are those of Stier and Thiele (Leipsic, 1847–1863; 3d ed., 1854–1864) with Hebrew, Septuagint, and Vulgate, and of R. de Levante (London, 1876, 6 vols.).

== Rabbinic Bibles ==
Another class of Bibles, and these distinctively Jewish, are those that are known as Rabbinic Bibles, or Miḳra'ot Gedolot. The first of these was published at Venice 1517–18; the editor was Felix Pratensis. It contains the Pentateuch with Onḳelos and Rashi, the Former and Later Prophets with Targum Jonathan and Ḳimḥi's comments (the anti-Christian passages omitted); Psalms with Targum and Ḳimḥi; Proverbs with the commentary known as "Ḳaw we-Naḳi"; Job with the commentaries of Naḥmanides and Abraham Farrisol; the Five Scrolls with the commentary of Levi b. Gerson; Ezra and Chronicles with the commentaries of Rashi and Simon ha-Darshan. To these were added the Jerusalem Targum to the Pentateuch; Targum Sheni to Esther; the variant readings of Ben Asher and Ben Naphtali; the thirteen "articles of faith" of Maimonides; the 613 precepts according to Aaron Jacob Ḥasan; and a table of the parashiyot and Hafṭarot according to the Spanish and German rites. This edition is the first in which Samuel, Kings, and Chronicles are divided into two books, and Nehemiah is separated from Ezra. It is the first also to indicate in the margin the numbers of the chapters in Hebrew letters. The ḳeri consonants are also given in the margin.

The edition was not, however, pleasing to the Jews, perhaps because its editor was a convert to Christianity. Elijah Levita, in his "Masoret ha-Masoret," severely criticizes the Masoretic notes. This edition was replaced in 1525 by the second Bomberg text, which was edited by Jacob b. Ḥayyim of Tunis under the title. This text, more than any other, has influenced all later ones; though readings from the Complutensian and from the Soncino edition of 1488 have occasionally found their way in. It is peculiar as being the first to insert the letters פ and ס for the purpose of indicating the open and closed sections, and to designate the ḳeri by the letter ק. Here also the first attempt is made, though incompletely, to collect the Masorah, both "Magna" and "Parva." As in the best manuscripts, the larger Masorah is printed above and below the text (Hebrew and Targum in parallel columns); while the lesser Masorah is printed between the columns. Besides the elaborate introduction to the Masorah by Jacob b. Ḥayyim himself, an index to the Masorah, Ibn Ezra's introduction to the Pentateuch, Moses ha-Naḳdan's treatise on accents, the variations between the Easterns and the Westerns and between Ben Asher and Ben Naphtali, it contains the Pentateuch with Targum, Rashi, and Ibn Ezra; the Former Prophets with Rashi, Ḳimḥi, and Levi b. Gershon; Isaiah with Rashi and Ibn Ezra; Jeremiah and Ezekiel with Rashi and Ḳimḥi; the Minor Prophets with Rashi and Ibn Ezra; Psalms with Rashi and Ibn Ezra; Proverbs with Ibn Ezra, Moses Ḳimḥi, and Levi ben Gershon; Job with Ibn Ezra and Levi ben Gershon; Daniel with Ibn Ezra and Saadia; Ezra with Ibn Ezra, Moses Ḳimḥi, and Rashi; Chronicles with PseudoRashi; and the Five Scrolls with Rashi and Ibn Ezra. This Bible was reprinted, with readings inserted from the edition of Felix Pratensis (Venice, 1525–1528).

The third edition of the Bomberg Rabbinic Bible (1546–1548) was edited by Cornelius Adelkind. It was practically a reprint of the second, except that the commentary of Ibn Ezra on Isaiah was omitted; while that of Jacob ben Asher on the Pentateuch and that of Isaiah di Trani on Judges and Samuel were inserted. This third Bomberg edition was repeated in the fourth edition by Isaac b. Joseph Salam and Isaac ben Gershon (Treves). Part of the Masorah omitted in the third edition has here been reinserted. The fifth edition was a reprint of De Gara's (Venice, 1617–19, by Pietro Lorenzo Bragadini, and revised by Leo di Modena). It was, however, expurgated by the Inquisition. The sixth edition, by Johannes Buxtorf (Basel, 1618–19, 2 vols.), was a reprint of the 1546-1548 copy. To this was added the editor's "Tiberias," a Masoretic work. The seventh Biblia Rabbinica was published at Amsterdam, 1724-1728 (4 vols., fol. 1), under the title "Ḳehillot Mosheh." It contains, besides the Hebrew text, the Targum on the whole Bible; Rashi, Ibn Ezra, Levi ben Gershon, Obadiah Sforno, Jacob b. Asher, Ḣizkuni, and 'Imre No'am on the Pentateuch; David Ḳimḥi on the Prophets and the Chronicles; Isaiah di Trani on Judges and Samuel; "Keli Yaḳar" on the Former Prophets, and "Keli-Paz," by Samuel Laniado, on the Later Prophets; Meïr Arama on Isaiah, Jeremiah, and the Song of Solomon; Jacob Berab on Isaiah, Jeremiah, Ezekiel, and some other Later Prophets; Samuel Almosnino on the Later Prophets; Isaac Gershon on Malachi; "Torat Ḥesed" by Isaac ben Solomon; Ya'bez on Psalms, Job, Canticles, Ruth, Lamentations, Ecclesiastes, Daniel, Ezra, Nehemiah, and Chronicles; Joseph ibn Yaḥya on the Hagiographa; "Mizmor le-Todah," by Samuel Arepol, on Psalm cxix.; "Ḳaw we-Naḳi" on Proverbs; Menahem Meïri on Proverbs; Moses Ḳimḥi on Proverbs, Ezra, Nehemiah; Naḥmanides, Farissol, and Simon ben Zemaḥ Duran on Job; Saadia Gaon on Daniel; Yalḳut Shim'oni on Chronicles; Moses of Frankfurt's annotations, entitled "Ḳomaz Minḥah," on the Pentateuch; "Minḥah Ḳeṭannah" on the Former Prophets; "Minḥah Gedolah" on the Later Prophets, "Minḥat 'Ereb" on the Hagiographa; the introduction of Jacob b. Ḥayyim of Tunis; and the tract on the accents by Moses ha-Naḳdan.

=== The Warsaw Rabbinic Bible ===
The latest Biblia Rabbinica, with thirty-two commentaries, is that published at Warsaw by Levensohn (1860–1868, 12 vols., small fol.). It contains, besides the original Hebrew, the Targums Onḳelos and Yerushalmi on the Pentateuch, the Targum Jonathan on the Prophets, and Targums to the Hagiographa, including the Targum Sheni on Esther. Of commentaries it contains that of Rashi on the whole Bible; Aaron Pesaro's "Toledot Aharon"; Asheri's commentary and Norzi's notes on the Bible; Ibn Ezra on the Pentateuch, the Five Megillot, the Minor Prophets, the Psalms, Job, and Daniel; Moses Ḳimḥi on the Proverbs; Naḥmanides on the Pentateuch; Obadiah Sforno on the Pentateuch, the Song of Solomon, and Ecclesiastes; Elijah Wilna on the Pentateuch, Joshua, Isaiah, and Ezekiel; S. E. Lenczyz and S. Edels on the Pentateuch; J. H. Altschuler on the Prophets and Hagiographa; David Ḳimḥi on the Later Prophets; Levi ben Gershon no Joshua, Kings, Proverbs, and Job; Isaiah di Trani on Judges and Samuel; S. Oceda on Ruth and Lamentations; Eliezer ben Elijah Ashkenazi on Esther; Saadia on Daniel. It also contains the Masorah Magna and Parva, tracts on the vowels and accents, the various readings of Ben Asher and Ben Naphtali, and the introduction of Jacob ben Ḥayyim of Tunis.

== Subsequent editions ==
Several editions were published at Venice by Daniel Bomberg, 1517, 1521, 1525–28. Of later editions, only a few of the more important can be mentioned here. Joseph Athias (Amsterdam, 1661) edited the text, using Buxtorf's edition and the traditional one, that had come down from Soncino (1488), with a comparison of two manuscripts. This was reprinted by Leusden in 1667. A third edition was brought out by Daniel Ernest Jablonski (Berlin, 1690), but with a comparison of all the earlier editions (other editions 1712, and, without vowels, 1711). Jablonski's, in turn, became the foundation of that of J. H. Michaelis (Halle, 1720), for which the latter compared five Erfurt manuscripts and nineteen printed editions. The Mantuan Bible of 1742–44, edited by Rafael Ḥayyim b. Abiad Shalom Basilea and Felice (Maṣliaḥ) Marini, was in a measure only a reprint of Michaelis; Raphael in his edition of the excellent text, as corrected by Norzi ("Minḥat Shai," Mantua, 1732–44), tried to unify the text and not simply to reprint the older editions.

=== Van der Hooght ===
The basis of all the modern editions of the Bible is that of E. van der Hooght (Amsterdam and Utrecht, 1705). It is practically a reprint of the Athias-Leusden edition; but at the end it has variants taken from a number of printed editions. It has been much prized because of its excellent and clear type; but no manuscripts were used in its preparation. This text was followed, even when variants were added, by Proops, Houbigant, Simon, Kennicott, Hahn, etc. The text of D. H. Opitz (Kiel, 1709) seems to be a mixed one; three manuscripts, a number of the earlier editions, and the polyglots having been laid under contribution. But still the Van der Hooght was considered to be a sort of "textus receptus," the first edition of Max Letteris (Vienna, 1852) showing very few changes. The first Hebrew Bible in America, published by William Fry at Philadelphia in 1814, was from the text of Van der Hooght, and it was reprinted in Philadelphia by Isaac Leeser in 1849.

In 1866, Letteris produced a revised edition for a Christian missionary organization, the British and Foreign Bible Society. This revision was checked against old manuscripts and early printed editions, and has a very legible typeface. It is probably the most widely reproduced text of the Hebrew Bible in history, with many dozens of authorised reprints and many more pirated and unacknowledged ones.

This revised edition became very popular, and was widely reprinted in both Jewish circles (often accompanied by a translation on facing pages) and in Christian circles (with the addition of the New Testament).

=== Editions since the 19th century ===
The 1901-1905 Jewish Encyclopedia summarized the then state of scholarship as follows:

No serious attempt was made to issue a text of the Bible after the best manuscripts and the Masorah until S. Baer commenced his publications with the help of Franz Delitzsch (1861 et seq.). His edition, unfortunately not completed, has become the standard. Based upon a much fuller comparison of manuscripts is the edition of the Masoretic Bible of Chr. D. Ginsburg (London, 1895), which may be considered to represent the truest Masoretic tradition. Of quite a different character is the polychrome edition of the Bible, now (1902) nearly completed, published by Paul Haupt (Leipsic and Baltimore, 1893 et seq.) with the aid of the foremost Biblical scholars. Under the title "The Sacred Books of the Old Testament," it endeavors to give a critical edition of the Hebrew text on the basis of the versions and the results of modern critical inquiry. The supposed sources are distinguished by various colors.

For editions since that time see Masoretic Text#Some important editions.
