= Jacob di Algaba =

Hebrew translator known for translating Amadis de Gaul

Jacob ben Moses di Algaba (Hebrew: יעקב בן משה די אלגבא) was a Hebrew translator, known for his version of the medieval romance Amadis de Gaul. This translation is believed to have been published by the Soncino family in Constantinople sometime between 1534 and 1546. A rare copy of the work was housed in the British Museum.

The surname "Algaba" may have origins either as a patronym or an apocope of the Hebrew word gabbai, in which case its full form would be "Algabai."
