= Aaron Selig ben Moses of Zolkiev =

Polish Jewish author

Aaron Selig ben Moses of Zolkiev was a Polish Jewish author who flourished in the seventeenth century. He wrote "'Amude Sheba'" (Seven Pillars) containing: (1) Commentaries and glosses on the old and the new Zohar, explaining the foreign words therein; (2) treatises not included in the old Zohar; (3) references where commentaries on the treatises of the old and the new Zohar can be found; (4) similar indications of the book "Tiḳḳunim"; (5) remarks on the style of the Zohar. The work was published at Kraków in 1637.
