= Aaron Mosessohn =

German rabbi (died 1780)

Rabbi Aaron Mosessohn

Personal life
- Died: 1780 Ansbach, Bavaria
- Occupation: Rabbi

Religious life
- Religion: Judaism

Aaron Mosessohn (Hebrew: אהרן בן משה מגזע צבי; died 1780) was a German rabbi.

== Biography ==
Aaron Mosessohn was likely born in Glogau, and was a descendant of the Tzvi family. His great-grandfather was the noted Talmudist Shabbethai Cohen.

In 1763 he was elected rabbi of Berlin, having previously been rabbi of Dessau. Under the title Aaron Mosessohn's Friedenspredigt (Berlin, 1763), Mendelssohn published a thanksgiving sermon which Mosessohn had written after the peace of Hubertsburg in 1763. It was reprinted in Mendelssohn's Gesammelte Schriften (vi. 407–415), and in Hebrew in Ha-Me'assef, (1789, pp. 14–24).

Aaron edited He-ʻArukh mi-Shakh (Berlin, 1767), the commentary of Shabbethai Cohen on the Shulḥan ʻArukh Yoreh De'ah, to which he added notes of his own. About 1771 he accepted the rabbinate of Schwabach, with which the office of chief rabbi of the principality of Ansbach was united. Upon his recommendation the congregation of Berlin conferred upon Mendelssohn honorary membership on April 3, 1771.

== Publications ==
- Mosessohn, Aaron; Leo, Hartog (1763). Drush ʻal ha-shalom / Friedenspredigt: gehalten in der Synagoge zu Berlin am Sabbath den 27ten Adar [5]523. (den 12ten März 1763) (in Hebrew and German). Translated by R. S. K. Berlin: Leo Hartog.
- He-ʻArukh mi-Shakh (in Hebrew). Berlin: A. Shpeyer. 1767.
