= Bahiel ben Moses =

Bahiel ben Moses was a Jewish physician of the thirteenth century who lived in Zaragoza.

== Biography ==
Bahiel was court physician to King James I of Aragon, and in that capacity was present at the conquest of Majorca, where he rendered valuable service as interpreter between the Arabic-speaking Majorcan Moors and the conqueror, who understood only the Limousin dialect. In the dispute concerning Maimonides' writings, Bahiel made himself by his zeal the leading representative of the philosopher's defenders. In 1232 he wrote the appeal to the Jewish congregations of Aragon to recognize the excommunication pronounced upon Solomon ben Abraham of Montpellier and his associates. Bahiel and his brother Solomon Bahiel ben Moses lived in Zaragoza.
