= Itsik Moshe =

Israel Zionist

- Born: December 31, 1959 (age 66)
- Occupations: Chairman of Israeli House NET, the organization concentrated on Israeli Hasbara, (israelihouse.net) which works in more than 20 countries today, from 2013; Vice President of the European Alliance for Israel (EAI), from 2021; Member of the board in The European Association for the Preservation and Promotion of Jewish Culture and Heritage (AEPJ).; Member of ICC Georgia and the chair of the Trade & Investment Commission.; Chairman of Israel-Georgia Chamber of Business.
- Known for: First representative of the Jewish Agency in the former Soviet Union, from 1990

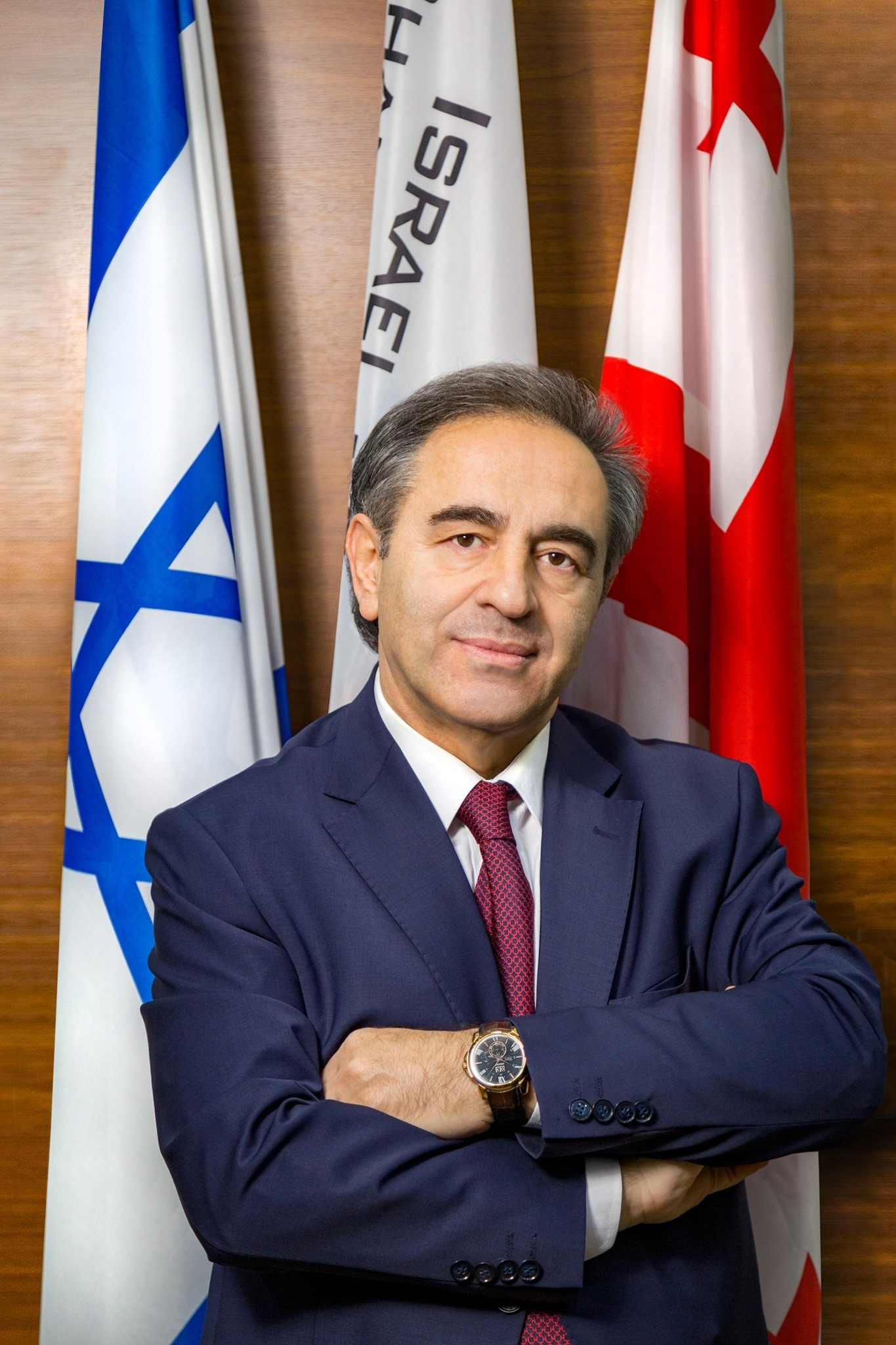

Itsik Moshe (Hebrew: איציק משה) was born on December 31, in 1959 and is currently the founder and Chairman of Israeli House, an organization which represents a new methodology in public diplomacy (Hasbara) that enables optimal and effective Hasbara and the means of building bilateral bridges - for mutual benefits. Formerly he was the representative of the Jewish Agency in 5 USSR countries (Georgia, Azerbaijan, Uzbekistan, Kazakhstan, Kyrgyzstan) and now he is actively cooperating in Europe within the framework of cooperation with the European Alliance for Israel.

== Biography ==
He immigrated to Israel in 1971 from Georgia with his parents Anna and Ruben, a religious Zionist family. After rapid absorption, he continued studying in the religious school of Torah U’Melacha in Petah Tikva. He was elected as the Student Council chairman. After graduating from high school, he served in the air forces, as part of the reserve and was named an honorary soldier. As part of his academic studies at the University of Tel Aviv, he received two bachelor's degrees in sciences of education and technologies. In 1987, during his studies he became the Chairman of Student Unity and editor of newsletter "Meitar" at the university.

Despite career advancement in the department of communication, Itsik Moshe left his job in 1988 in favor of the Zionist challenge offered to him by WUJS (World Union of Jewish Students) for the purpose of introducing the organization to the Soviet Union. In 1989, during the Soviet regime he established the first mission of WUJS in the capital of Georgia, Tbilisi, and after that in other countries of the Soviet Union.

In 1990, he was elected as the first representative of the Jewish Agency in the Soviet Union and established the first official international representation center in the Soviet Socialist Republic of Georgia. Until 1992 Itsik Moshe served as the head of the Jewish Agency Representation Centers in South Caucasus and Central Asia. In 1994 he achieved the highest professional role and became the director of the central mission of Jewish Agency located in Moscow. This office supervised all other representation centers and representatives in the CIS.

Since 1996 Mr. Moshe serves as President of the Israel-Georgia Chamber of Business – the organization which has already become the main bridge between the countries in the fields of culture, business and public relations. At the same time, he raised money for Israel in Europe and Canada on behalf of Keren Hayesod. In 2012, he expressed his protest in media and publicly criticized the decision N67/19 of the United Nations General Assembly, where Georgia (Even though it is a friendly country), along with 138 countries, voted in favor of the Palestinian side. After this decision the idea of opening a Hasbara (Public diplomacy) campaign has been created.

In 2013 he founded Israeli House, which represents the organization of Israeli Hasbara (Public diplomacy) and aims to strengthen the connections between the friendly states. At the same time, he is the Chairman of the Association of Friends of the Museum of Prehistory located in the Upper Galilee and an invited member of the Knesset Lobby for the Promotion of a Solution for the Israeli-Arab Conflict. In 2020 he became chairman of the Trade and Investments Commission of the International Chamber of Commerce (ICC Georgia).

In 2020 he was awarded by 2 international certificates for supporting the studying of the Holocaust and for strengthening ties between the countries. First was certificate of Appreciation from Georgian-American University and the second award was Doctor Honoris Causa from the University of Georgia. In 2021 he was elected as the Vice President of the European Alliance for Israel (EAI). Also, in 2021 the book, Zionism against all odds, was published, which is related to Itsik Moshe's 30 years of activity on Zionism, Hasbara and the union of countries. Itsik Moshe is married to Alice Moshe and father of two children, Yamit Moskovich (Hi-tech specialist) and Yaniv Moshe (Businessman).

== Initiatives and activities ==
In 1975 he arranged the march of the youth from the center of the country to the settlement of Elon Moreh. In 1989 he established the first branch of WUJS in the Soviet Union. In 1989 Mr. Moshe conducted the first international conference of Jewish students in Israel as a part of WUJS activities. In the conference delegations from the Soviet Union participated for the first time.

In 1990 he established the first representation center of the Jewish Agency in the Soviet Socialist Republic of Georgia. In 1990 Itsik Moshe arranged the first historic conference in Tbilisi, in the period of "Iron Curtain", while this kind of activities were prohibited by the totalitarian Soviet rule. Delegations of Jewish organizations from 46 cities of the Soviet Union attended the conference. In 1990–1992 five Representation Centers of the Jewish Agency were opened in FSU (South Caucasus and Central Asia). In 1991 he supported the establishment of two representation centers of JDC (The Leading Global Jewish Humanitarian Organization) in the Caucasus. In 1993 he founded the group of friends of Israel and the Jewish Agency in participation of the local governments of post-soviet states. He had support from the Office of the President of Israel, when Chaim Herzog was president. In 1996 Itsik Moshe established the first bi-national chamber of business in Georgia, the Israel-Georgia Chamber of Business (tourism, economy and representing Israeli interests).

In 2013 in cooperation with the Knesset members he established a pilot project of Israeli House which later in 2016 became a member of EAI – European Alliance for Israel. In 2016 he conducted the first international forum of Hasbara in Tbilisi, where representatives of the Government of Israel, the Knesset, and the Government of Georgia participated with various international organizations. Furthermore, he was the organizer of 20 economic forums between Israel and Georgia to promote cooperation between the City Halls of Jerusalem and Tbilisi, as well as between Governmental authorities, to deepen working links[7] between Georgian Parliament and the Knesset. At his initiative, negotiations began on a Free Trade Agreement (FTA) between the two countries. In 2017 a cooperation, between Israeli House, the Ministry of Culture of Georgia and the AEPJ – The European Association of Jewish Heritage, was launched to promote Jewish Heritage in Georgia. The concept of Israeli House was successfully introduced in European countries and international organizations. Since the opening of Israeli House, based on its activities, this is a political plan to achieve the ultimate goal – to develop 100 Hasbara representation centers around the globe without Israeli Governmental expenditures. Itsik Moshe was elected as a member of the board of AEPJ in 2022. Itsik was elected as a member of the board of EAI in 2022, also as the Vice President of the organization.

== Typical views ==
The philosophy of his life is based on three main points:

1. Israeli and Jewish activities abroad – under the activities he consider the necessity of reforms in the Jewish world after the Great Allyiah.
2. Israeli Hasbara – strengthening Hasbara policy led by the slogan "Let’s do and let them hear!" deepening the links with friendly countries. His aim is to present a real Israel in the education system and in a society that has a strong influence in shaping the country's policies and directions.
3. The necessity of full Israelization – Itsik Moshe considers the ethnic gap and antipathy as the greatest challenge and danger to Israel society, which still continuously develops in the newly repatriated groups in Israel and stays unsolvable. He sees the danger in Particularism and is against it, because Mr. Moshe believes, that only a whole community can build a country. He also believes, that "complete disengagement from the culture and lifestyle of the past" is the only way to reach complete Israelization and Absorption.

The philosophy of Itsik Moshe - The Jewish people have two options 1. They must live in Israel and build a country with blood and sweat. 2. To live temporarily outside of the country and at the same time do everything every minute for the sake of Israel's development. There is no third option. This is his way of life and the motivation for his work.
