= Menahem ben Moshe Bavli =

Menahem Ben Moshe Bavli
- Died: 1571
- Other names: Menahem Ben Moses Bavli, Menahem ben Moshe ha-Bavli, Menahem ben Moshe HaBavli, Recanati, Menahem ben Moses ha-Bavli Recanati and Menachem Ben Moses HaBavli Rekanati
- Occupations: Rabbi and author
- Years active: 1500–1570s

Menahem ben Moshe Bavli (Bavli meaning from Mesopotamia), also known as Menahem Ben Moshe ha-Bavli, (died 1571) was a Jewish rabbi and author of the 1571 book Ta'amei Ha-Misvot ("The Reasons For The Precepts").

== Life ==
Although many details about his life are unknown, different stories say he was originally from Italy or Baghdad until moving to a variety of places. In 1522 and 1525, he was a dayan in Trikkala, Ottoman Greece until moving to Erez and also Safed, both in the Land of Israel (Ottoman Syria at the time), where his father and brother, Reuben, accompanied him, where they worked in wool dyeing. Menahem was also a correspondent of Joseph ben Ephraim Karo. Menahem was considered one of the town's best scholars and published Maran le-Even ha-Ezer in which he insinuated being a student of Jacob Beran. He visited Egypt until returning to Safed and eventually going to Hebron in 1540, where was one of a group of important Sephardic Jewish scholars living there in the 16th century, after acquiring land from the Karaites.

Russian-Hebrew poet David Vogel used one of Menachem' works after Vogel visited Paris and Palestine.
