= Solomon Bahiel ben Moses =

Solomon Bahiel ben Moses was the brother of Bahiel ben Moses; like his more famous brother, was also a physician and interpreter in the suite of King James I of Aragon. He was the author of the Arabic proclamation in which the Moors were notified of the conquest of Majorca and summoned to acknowledge their submission. In the Maimonidean controversy Solomon sided with his brother and joined the faction of Maimonides' supporters. He died in 1264. The "Confirmacion en Favor de Mosse hijo de Bahiel" and "á Favor de Salomon Bahiel," in regard to the legacy of Solomon Alfaquin, may perhaps refer to two sons of Solomon Bahiel. They are dated 3 Kalends April, 1264, and 6 Ides May, 1264.

== Sources ==
- Gottheil, Richard and Mayer Kayserling. "Bahiel". Jewish Encyclopedia. Funk and Wagnalls, 1901–1906; citing:

- Kayserling, Gesch. der Juden in Spanien und Portugal, i. 160, 218;
- Iggerot ha-Rambam, ed. Prag, pp. 34a, 35b;
- Brüll, Jahrbücher, iv. 22;
- Grätz, Gesch. der Juden, vii. 33, 57;
- Jacobs, Sources, pp. 285, 286.
