= Michael ben Moses Kohen =

Palestinian rabbi

Michael ben Moses Kohen was a Palestinian rabbi and liturgist who lived in Jerusalem in the seventeenth century. He wrote Moreh Tzedek (Salonica, 1655), an index to the laws contained in the Shulchan Aruch, showing where they may be found in other works of the poskim as well as in the responsa of later rabbis. There is also ascribed to him another work, Et le-Chenanah (Venice, 1708), consisting of prayers to be recited at the Western Wall of the ancient Temple.

== Sources ==
Jewish Encyclopedia bibliography: F. Delitzsch, Gesch. der Jüdischen Poesie, pp. 56–57; Fürst, Bibl. Jud. i. 182; Steinschneider, Cat. Bodl. No. 3271; idem, Jewish Literature, p. 242.A.
