= Isaac ben Moses Eli =

15th-century Spanish Jewish mathematician

Isaac ben Moses Eli ha-Sefaradi was a fifteenth century Spanish Jewish mathematician, born at Oriola, Aragon.

According to Steinschneider, he may have been one of the Spanish exiles of 1492, probably leaving to Constantinople. He wrote a mathematical work entitled Meleket ha-Mispar, divided into three parts: (1) a theory of numbers, dealing with the first four rules and the extraction of square roots; (2) proportion, etc.; and (3) elementary geometry. The book is an introduction to Euclid, and begins with a definition of the science of figures.
