= Abraham Jekuthiel Salman ben Moses Joseph Lichtstein =

18th-century Polish rabbi

Abraham Jekuthiel Salman ben Moses Joseph Lichtstein was the rabbi of Płońsk in the region of Warsaw, in the eighteenth century. He was the author of a work entitled Zera' Abraham (Dyhernfurth, 1811), a commentary on the Sifre, followed by Biblical and Talmudical indexes, and accompanied with the text. Lichtstein wrote also a preface and added a homily to his son's Shoshannat ha'Amakim.
