= Löb ben Moses Minden =

- Born: 17th century Selichow
- Died: 26 May 1751; Altona or Hamburg
- Occupations: Cantor, poet
- Writing career
- Language: Hebrew

Löb ben Moses Minden (Hebrew: ליב בן משה מינדן; died 26 May 1751), also known as Judah ben Moses Selichower (Yiddish: יהודה בן משה זעליחאבר, Hebrew: יהודה בן משה מזליחוב), was a ḥazzan and poet.

== Biography ==
Minden was born in Selichow, Lesser Poland, in the seventeenth century. He acted as ḥazzan at Minden-on-the-Weser, whence his name "Minden." He was the author of Shire Yehudah, Hebrew songs with German translations and music. One of these begins: "Ihr lieben Brüder und Gesellen, die da sitzen und zechen," and another, "Hört zu, ihr Leut, gedenkt an die Zeit." In an epilogue to this work (Amsterdam, 1696) he exhorts the rabbis not to allow conversation in the synagogue. He wrote also Zemer va-Shir (Frankfurt-on-the-Main, 1714), which was printed by Solomon London.

He died at an advanced age in Altona or Hamburg in 1751.

== Publications ==
- Shire Yehudah [Songs of Judah] (in Hebrew). Amsterdam: Ascher Anschel Ben-Eliezer. 1695–96.
- Zemer va-Shir [Song and Poetry] (in Hebrew). Frankfurt-on-the-Main: Solomon London. 1714.
