= Operation Moshe =

Operation Moshe may refer to:

- Operation Moses (Moshe), the covert removal of Ethiopian Jews from Sudan in 1984
- Battle of Beersheba (1948), codenamed Operation Moshe, the Israeli capture of Beersheba
