= Hebrew incunabula =

The Hebrew incunabula are a group of Hebrew books, pamphlets or broadside printed before the year 1501.

Only about 100 incunabula are determined to have been definitively printed before 1500. There are eight of which either no copy is known, or the time and place of publication can not be definitely determined. Currently, more than 100 incunabula have been discovered since an article was first written about the topic in The Jewish Encyclopedia in 1901.

The total number of identified Hebrew incunabula is about 175, though more may exist or have existed. A list of ascertained incunabula is given in tabular form below, and to these may be added the last-mentioned eight, which include the Talmud tractates Ketubot, Giṭṭin, and Baba Meẓi'a, each printed separately by Joshua Soncino in 1488–89, and of which no copy is known to exist. The same fate has met all the copies of the Leiria Edition of the Early Prophets (1494). There is also a siddur of the Roman rite, probably published by one of the Soncinos, and, from its type, likely to be of the fifteenth century. This was first described by Abraham Berliner; a copy is possessed by E. N. Adler of London, and an incomplete copy is in the library of Frankfort-on-the-Main. In addition, there are two editions of Maimonides' Mishneh Torah, one possibly printed in Italy in the fifteenth century, a copy of which is in the library of the Vienna community; the other, parts of which Dr. E. Mittwoch of Berlin possesses, was probably printed in Spain.

== Date of first printing ==
The date at which printing in Hebrew began can not be definitely established. There is a whole series of works without date or place (12-21) which experts are inclined to assign to Rome (where Latin printing began in 1467), and any or all of these may be before the first dated work, which is an edition of Rashi's commentary on the Pentateuch, published in Reggio, Calabria, by Abraham Garton, 5 February 1475. It may be assumed that the actual printing of this work took some time, and that it was begun in the latter part of 1474. Even this must have been preceded by the printing of the four parts of the Arba'ah Turim of Yaakov ben Asher, finished 3 July 1475, in Piove di Sacco by Meshullam Cusi, which must have taken considerably longer to print than the Rashi. It is exceptional for Hebrew works to be dated at all before 1482, but from that time onward to 1492, during which decade two-thirds of the Hebrew incunabula were produced, most of them are dated. With the expulsion from Spain in 1492 the Hebrew printing-presses in that country were stopped, and those in Italy and Portugal produced only about a dozen works during the remainder of the century.

== Places of printing ==
Hebrew books were produced in the fifteenth century in the Italian and Iberian peninsulas, the Ottoman Empire, Leiden and Paris though several of the printers were of German origin, as Abraham Jedidiah, the Soncinos, Ḥayyim ha-Levi, Joseph and Azriel Gunzenhauser. The period under review was perhaps the nadir of Jewish fortunes in Germany. Expulsions occurred throughout the land, and it is not to be wondered at that no Hebrew presses were started in the land of printing. In all there are known seventeen places where Hebrew printing took place in the fifteenth century—eleven in Italy, three in Spain, and three in Portugal, as may be seen from the following list, which gives in chronological order the places, the names of the printers, and numbers (in parentheses) indicating the works printed by each, the numbers having reference to the following table.

== Table of incunabula ==
Ref. no. in text	Date.		Author and Title.	Place.	Printer.	Bibliography.	Location of manuscript
	1469/72		Leṿi ben Gershon, Perush Daniel	Rome(?)		Ohly, Sack p. 333	Frankfurt am Main (2024)
1	1475	Feb. 5	Rashi, Pentateuch	Reggio, Calabria	Abraham Garton	R. 3-5, St. 2342	Parma
2	1475	July 3	Yaakov ben Asher, Arba'ah Turim	Piove di Sacco	Meshullam Cusi	R. 5-7, St. 1182	B. C. F. G. L. O. Parma. S.
3	1476	July 6	Yaakov ben Asher, Tur Orah Hayyim	Mantua	Abraham Conat	R. 9-12, St. 1188	B. Breslau, O. Parma. S.
4	1477	May 16	Levi b. Gershon, Job	Ferrara	Abraham dei Tintori	R. 1, St. 1613	B. Berlin Royal, F. G. O. Parma
5	1477	June 25	Yaakov ben Asher, Tur Yoreh De'ah	Ferrara	Abraham dei Tintori	R. 9-12, 19-22, St. 1186	B. Breslau, O.
6	1477	Aug. 29	Psalms with Kimhi	Bologna	Hayyim Mordecai, Hezekiah de Ventura	R. 14, St. 1 (Add. lxxi.), G. 780-94	A. B. Breslau, Ch. F. O. Parma, S.
7	1475-80		Eldad ha-Dani	Mantua	Abraham Conat	St. 924: Luzzatto, Litt. Or. 1846, No. 31.	B. O. Padua
8	1475-80		Yosippon	Mantua	Abraham Conat	R. 114-20, St. 1549	B. Berlin, C. F. G. Ga. L. N. O.
9	1475-80		Judah b. Jehiel, Nofet Zufim	Mantua	Abraham Conat	R. 112, St. 1332	A. B. C. F. Ga. L. N. O. P. Parma, S.
10	1476-80		Jedaiah Bedersi, Behinat 'Olam	Mantua	Estellina Conat	R. 110-1, St. 1283	A. B. F. O.
11	Before 1480		Levi b. Gershon, Pentateuch	Mantua	Abraham Conat, Abraham of Cologne	R. 111, St. 1611	A. B. C. Ch. F. Fr. G. Ga. L. O. P. Parma, S.
12	Before 1480		Rashi, Pentateuch	Rome (?)	Obadiah, Manasseh, Benjamin	R. 124, St. 2342	B. O. S.
13	Before 1480		Nathan b. Jehiel, 'Aruk	Rome (?)	Obadiah, Manasseh, Benjamin of Rome	R. 123, St. 2040; Geiger, Zt. iii. 280, iv. 123	B. Breslau, C. F. G. Ga. L. O. Parma
14	Before 1480		Nahmanides, Pentateuch	Rome (?)	Obadiah, Manasseh, Benjamin of Rome	R. 122, St. 1960	B. C. Ch. F. O. Parma, Stras.
15	Before 1480		Moses de Couey, Semag	Rome (?)		R. 122, St. 1796	Breslau, F. O. S.
16	Before 1480		Levi ben Gershon, Daniel	Rome (?)		R. 124, St. 1614	B. Breslau, F. Parma, S.
17	Before 1480		Solomon b. Adret, Responsa	Rome (?)		R. 126, St. 2272	C. Ch. F. G. O. P. Parma
18	Before 1480		Maimonides, Mishneh Torah	Rome (?)	Solomon b. Judah, Obadiah b. Moses	R. 126-7, St. 1869	A. B. C. Ch. F. G. O. P. Parma, S.
19	Before 1480		Psalms, unpointed	Italy		R. 128, St. 161; Proctor, No. 7436	B. Munich Royal, O. Parma
20	Before 1480		Psalms, unpointed, with Grace	Italy		R. 129, St. 161	Parma,
21	Before 1480		D. Kimhi, Shorashim	Rome (?)		R. 125, St. 873	Amsterdam Seminary, Parma
22	Before 1480		D. Kimhi, Isaiah and Jeremiah	(?)		R. 109, St. 869	Parma
23	Before 1480		Mordecai Finzi, Luhot, tables	Mantua	Abraham Conat	R. 113, St. 1658.	—
24	Before 1480		Maimonides, Moreh Nebukim	Rome (?)		R. 121, St. 1894	A. Ch. F. G. L. O. Parma, S.
25	1482	Jan. 26	Pentateuch with Onkelos and Rashi	Bologna	Abraham dei Tintori	R. 22, St. 1; Geiger, Zt. v. 99; G. 792-802	B. Berlin, F. N. Y. Pub., N. O. Parma
26	1482		D. Kimhi, Later Prophets	Guadalajara	Solomon ibn Alkabiz	Geiger, Zt. v. 37; St. 869	B. Breslau
27	1482		Yaakov ben Asher, Tur Eben ha-'Ezer	Guadalajara	Solomon ibn Alkabiz	St. 1190; Häbler, Icon. Iber	O.
28	1482-83		Megillot with Rashi	Bologna	Abraham dei Tintori	R. 130, St. 158	Parma,
29	1483	Dec. 19	Talmud Babli Berakot	Soncino	Joshua Solomon Soncino	R. 28-34, St. 217, 244, H. B. i. 867	B. F. O. Parma
30	1483	Dec. 19	Talmud Babli Bezah	Soncino	Joshua Solomon Soncino	St. 246	B. F. O. Vatican
31	1484	Jan. 14	Ibn Gabirol, Mibhar ha-Peninim	Soncino	Joshua Solomon Soncino	R. 35, St. 2319	A. B. C. F. Fr. G. Munich, N. O. P. Parma, S.
32	1484	Dec. 12	Jedaiah Bedersi, Behinat 'Olam	Soncino	Joshua Solomon Soncino	R. 28, St. 1284; Rabbinovicz, Ma'amar, 11	A. B. C. Ch. F. Fr. G. L. Munich, N. O. P. S. bis
33	1484-85		Abot with Maimonides	Soncino	Joshua Solomon Soncino	R. 131, St. 228-9	A. B. C. Ch F. Fr. O. P. Parma, S.
34	1485 (?)		Talmud Babli Megillah	Soncino	Joshua Solomon Soncino	St. 217; Proctor, No. 7296	O.
35	1485	Aug.	Yaakov ben Asher, Tur Orah Hayyim	Hijar	Eliezer Alantansi	R. 39, St. 1186	B. F. Parma, S.
36	1485	Sept.	Mahzor, Roman rite, vol. i.	Soncino	Joshua Solomon Soncino	R. 46, St. 393	A. B. C. F. L. N. bis, O. P. S.
37	1485	Oct. 15	Former Prophets with Kimhi	Soncino	Joshua Solomon Soncino	R. 40, St. 1, G. 803-7	A. B. Ch. F. Fr. G. L. N. O. P. Parma, S. Strasburg, Stuttgart
38	1485	Dec. 29	Albo, 'Ikkarim	Soncino	Joshua Solomon Soncino	R. 114, St. 1443	A. B. Berlin, C. Ch. F. G. Ga. N. O. P. Parma, S.
39	1486		Immanuel Romi, Proverbs	Naples	Hayyim ha-Levi Ashkenazi	R. 133-4, St. 1058	A. B. Ch. F. G. O. Parma, S.
40	1486		Later Prophets with Kimhi	Soncino	Joshua Solomon Soncino	R. 131, St. 1-162	B. Ch. bis, F. Fr. L. O. P. Parma, S.
41	1486	April 7	Tefillat Yahid	Soncino	Joshua Solomon Soncino	Roest, Bet ha-Sefer; H. B. xix. 18	B. S.
41a	1486		Haggadah ED. PR.	Soncino	Joshua Solomon Soncino		S. (bound up with 41)
42	1486	Aug. 21	Mahzor, Roman rite, vol. ii	Casal Maggiore	Joshua Solomon Soncino	R. 46, St. 393	A. B. C. Ch. F. G. Ga. L. N. bis, O. P. Parma, S.
43	1486	Sept. 8	Hagiographa Variorum	Naples	Joseph Günzenhäuser	R. 52, St. 1, 162, 1058, G. 807-14	A. B. F. O. S.
44	1487	(1492)	Rashi, Pentateuch	Zamora	Samuel ben Musa, Immanuel	St. 2342	B. Breslau, Parma
45	1487		Yaakov ben Asher, Tur Yorch De'ah	Hijar	Eliezer Alantansi	St. 1189	B. F. Parma, S.
46	1487	Mar. 28	Psalms with Kimhi	Naples	Joseph Günzenhäuser	St. 2	A. B. Bresiau, Ga. Munich Royal, O. Parma, S. Stuttgart
47	1487	May 16	Seder Tahanunim	Soncino	Joshua Solomon Soncino	R. 51	B. Breslau, O.
48	1487	June 6	Rashi, Pentateuch	Soncino	Joshua Solomon Soncino	St. 2342	B. Breslau
49	1487	June 30	Faro Pentateuch	Faro, Portugal	Don Samuel Giacon	St. 163, 2781, G. 815-20	B.
50	1488		Bedersi, Bakashat ha-Memmin; Joseph Ezobi, Ka'arat Kesef, etc.	Soncino	Joshua Solomon Soncino	Wiener, Kohelet Mosheh, p. 1; R. E. J. xii. 119.	N. P.
51	1488,	Feb. 23	Bible	Soncino	Joshua Solomon Soncino	R. 57, St. 2, G. 820-31	B. Carlsruhe, Frankfurt am Main, O.
52	1488		M. Kimhi, Mahalak Shibbole ha-Da'at	Soncino	Joshua Solomon Soncino	Wiener, Kohelet Mosheh, p. 1	P.
53	1488	May 3	Abraham ibn Ezra, Pentateuch	Naples	Joseph Günzenhäuser	R. 58, St. 680	B. C. Ch. F. G. O. Parma
54	1488	Aug. 8	Makre Dardeke	"		St. 622	B. Berlin, Ch. N. O. Parma
55	1488	Dec. 19	Moses de Coucy, Semag, 2d ed.	Soncino	Gershon ben Moses Soncino	R. 61, St. 1797	A. B. Ch. F. Fr. N. O. P. Parma, S.
56	1489		Talmud Babli Shabbat	Soncino	Joshua Solomon Soncino	Rabbinovicz Ma'amar, 13; St. 217	F.
57	1489		Talmud Babli Baba Kamma	Soncino	Joshua Solomon Soncino	"	F.
58	1489	June 13	Talmud Babli Hullin	Soncino	Joshua Solomon Soncino	R. 64, St. 249	Ch. Parma
59	1489	July	Nahmanides, Pentateuch	Lisbon	Eliezer Toledano	R. 54, St. 1961	A. B. Ch. F. G. N. O. P. Parma, S. bis
60	1489	July 22	Talmud Babli Niddah	Soncino	Joshua Solomon Soncino	R. 66, St. 264	Ch. F. O. P. Parma, S.
61	1489	Aug.	Kalonymus, Eben Bohan	Naples	Joseph Günzenhäuser, Yom-Tob b. Perez, Solomon b. Perez	R. 67, St. 1578	A. B. Berlin, C. G. Ga. O. Parma, S.
62	1489	Nov. 18	Bahya ibn Pakuda, Hobot ha-Lebabot	Naples	Joseph Günzenhäuser, Yom-Tob b. Perez, Solomon b. Perez	R. 78, St. 780	B. C. Ch. F. Fr. G. Ga. L. Munich, O. P.
63	1489	Nov. 25	Abudarham, Perush seder ha-tefilot	Lisbon	Eliezer Alantansi	R. 67, St. 856	B. C. Ch. Frankfurt am Main, N. O. P. Parma, S.
64	1490		Yaakov ben Asher, Turim	Soncino	Solomon b. Moses Soncino	R. i. 138, St. 1182	A. B. Ch. F. Fr. G. N. O. P. Parma, S. bis
65	1490		Pentateuch with Onkelos, etc.	Hjar	Solomon Salmati ben Maimon	R. 75, St. 2, G. 831-6	B. N. O. Parma
66	1490		Jeshua Levi, Halikot 'Olam	Lisbon		St. 1392	B. N. O.
67	1490		Yaakov ben Asher, Tur Orah Hayyim	Lisbon	Eliezer Toledano	Proctor, No. 9837	B.
68	1490		Pentateuch with Megillot, etc.	Hijar	Eliezer Alantansi	R. 73-5, St. 156	A. B. O.
69	1490		Kol Bo	Naples		Proctor, No. 7437	A. B. Berlin, Ch. F. G. Ga. O. P. S.
70	1490	Jan. 23	Nahmanides, Sha'ar ha-Gemul	Naples	Joseph Günzenhäuser	R. 69, St. 1962	B. Berlin, Munich Royal, O. Parma, S.
71	1490	Mar. 23	Maimonides, Mishneh Torah	Soncino	Gershon ben Moses Soncino	R. 70, St. 1870; Zedner, 582	A. B. C. Ch. F. Fr. G. Ga. P. Parma, S.
72	1490	July 2	Nahmanides, Pentateuch	Naples	Isaac ben Judah ibn Katorzi	R. 71, St. 1961; Proctor, No. 6741	B. C. Ch. F. Fr. O. P. Parma, S.
73	1490	Aug.	Kimhi, Shorashim	Naples	Joseph Günzenbäuser	R. 78, St. 873; Proctor, No. 6734	A. B. Berlin, G. N. O. P. Parma, S.
74	1490	Dec. 12	Psalms, Proverbs, Job	Naples	Joshua Solomon Soncino	R. 79, St. 2	F. Parma
75	1490-91		Isaac ibn Sahula, Mashal ha-Kadmoni	Soncino	Gershon ben Moses Soncino	St. 1151	B. S.
76	1491		Bible	Naples	Joshua Solomon Soncino	R. 139, St. 155, G. 847-55	B. Fr.
77	1491		Pentateuch with accents	Naples	"	R. 83, St. 3	F. N. Parma, Stuttgart
78	1491	Feb. 11	Kimhi, Shorashim	Naples	Isaac ben Judah ibn Katorzi	R. 80, St. 873; Proctor, No. 6742; Zedner, 200	A. B. C. Ch. F. G. O. Parma, S.
79	1491	July	Pentateuch with Onkelos, etc.	Lisbon	Eliezer Toledano	R. 91-4, St. 2, G. 836-47	A. B. Berlin, F. Ga. N. O. P. Parma
80	1491	Oct. 30	Immanuel Romi, Mahberot	Brescia	Gershon Soncino	R. 84, St. 1057	A. B. C. Ch. F. G. Ga. L. N. Y. Pub. N. O. P. Parma, S.
81	1491	Nov. 9	Avicenna, Canon	Naples	Azriel Günzenhäuser	R. 86, St. 767	Amst. B. C. F. G. Ga. L. N. O. P. Parma, S. Stras.
82	1492		Proverbs with David ben Yahya	Lisbon		R. 143, St. 162	A. F. Fr. G. Parma,
83	1492		Isaiah and Jeremiah with Kimhi	Lisbon	Eliezer Toledano	R. 94, St. 3, G. 855-9	B. O. Parma, S.
84	1492	Jan. 23	Pentateuch with Megillot, etc.	Brescia	Gershon Soncino	R. 88, St. 3, G. 865-71	B. O. Parma,
85	1492	Feb. 28	Petah Debarai	Naples		R. 89, St. 634	Parma, Vatican
86	1492	May 8	Mishnah with Maimonides	Naples	Joshua Solomon Soncino	R. 90, St. 280	B. Ch. F. Fr. L. N. O. P. S.
87	1492	July	Bahya ben Asher, Pentateuch	Naples	Azriel Günzenhäuser	St. 777	Amst. B. Ga. P. S.
88	1492	July 25	Proverbs with Targum	Leiria	Abraham d'Ortas	R. 94, 174, St. 3, G. 859-65	B. O. P. Parma
89	1487-92		J. Landan, Agur	Naples		R. 148, St. 1225	A. B. F. Fr. Ga. O. P. Parma, S.
90	1493		Talmud Babli Bezah	Soncino	Gershon Soncino		B.
91	1493	Nov. 24	Pentateuch	Brescia	Gershon Soncino	St. 3	B. O.
92	1493	Dec. 16	Psalms	Brescia	Gershon Soncino	R. 98, St. 3	Florence
93	1494		Former Prophets	Leiria	Abraham d'Ortas	R. 104, St. 4	N. O. P. Parma
94	1494	May	Bible (?) with accents	Brescia	Gershon Soncino	R. 99-101, St. 3, G. 71 et seq., 871-80	B. Berlin, F. Munich, O. Parma, S.
	1494		Arba'ah Turim, Yaakov ben Asher	Constantinople	Nachmias Family		
95	1495		Mahzor, Roman rite, 2d ed.	Soncino (Brescia?)	Solomon ben Moses Soncino	R. 149, St. 394	B. F. N. O. S.
96	1495		Tefillot, German rite	Soncino (Brescia?)	Solomon ben Moses Soncino	St. 358	O.
97	1495		Selihot, German rite	Soncino (Brescia?)	Solomon ben Moses Soncino	St. 430	B. F.
98	1495	June 2	Yaakov ben Asher, Tur Orah Hayyim	Leiria	Abraham d'Ortas		F.
99	1490-95		Pentateuch with Megillot	Hijar	Eliezer Alantansi	R. 143, St. 156	N. O. Parma
100	1497	Sept. 15	Selihot	Barco	Gershon Soncino	St. 430	B. F. Fr. Parma
101	1497	Nov. 16	Talmud Babli Sanhedrin	Barco	Gershon Soncino	St. 273 (Add. lxxvii.)	B.

== Printers ==
As to the personal history of the printers enumerated in the list above very few details are known.

Abraham Conat was a physician whose wife Estellina Conat also was interested in printing; she produced the first edition of the "Beḥinat 'Olam." Garton, Cusi, and Giacon appear to have produced their works as a labor of love rather than for profit.

Abraham dei Tintori, the Soncinos, and the Gunzenhausers, on the other hand, seem to have regarded their craft as a means of livelihood.

The Soncinos, indeed, printed books in other characters than Hebrew (see Soncino family), as did also Abraham d'Ortas. There does not appear to have been much competition, though it is remarkable how invariably the choice of publishers fell within a limited class of works. In one case, however, two printers of the same city opposed each other with an edition of the same work. In August 1490, Joseph Gunzenhauser produced at Naples an edition of Ḳimḥi's "Shorashim"; on 11 February 1491, the same work was produced, as Zedner states, by Isaac b. Judah b. David Katorzi, who, according to Proctor, was also the printer of the Naples Naḥmanides of 1490. It would seem also that the two Pentateuchs of Hijar, 1490, were produced by rival printers.

== Typographical details ==
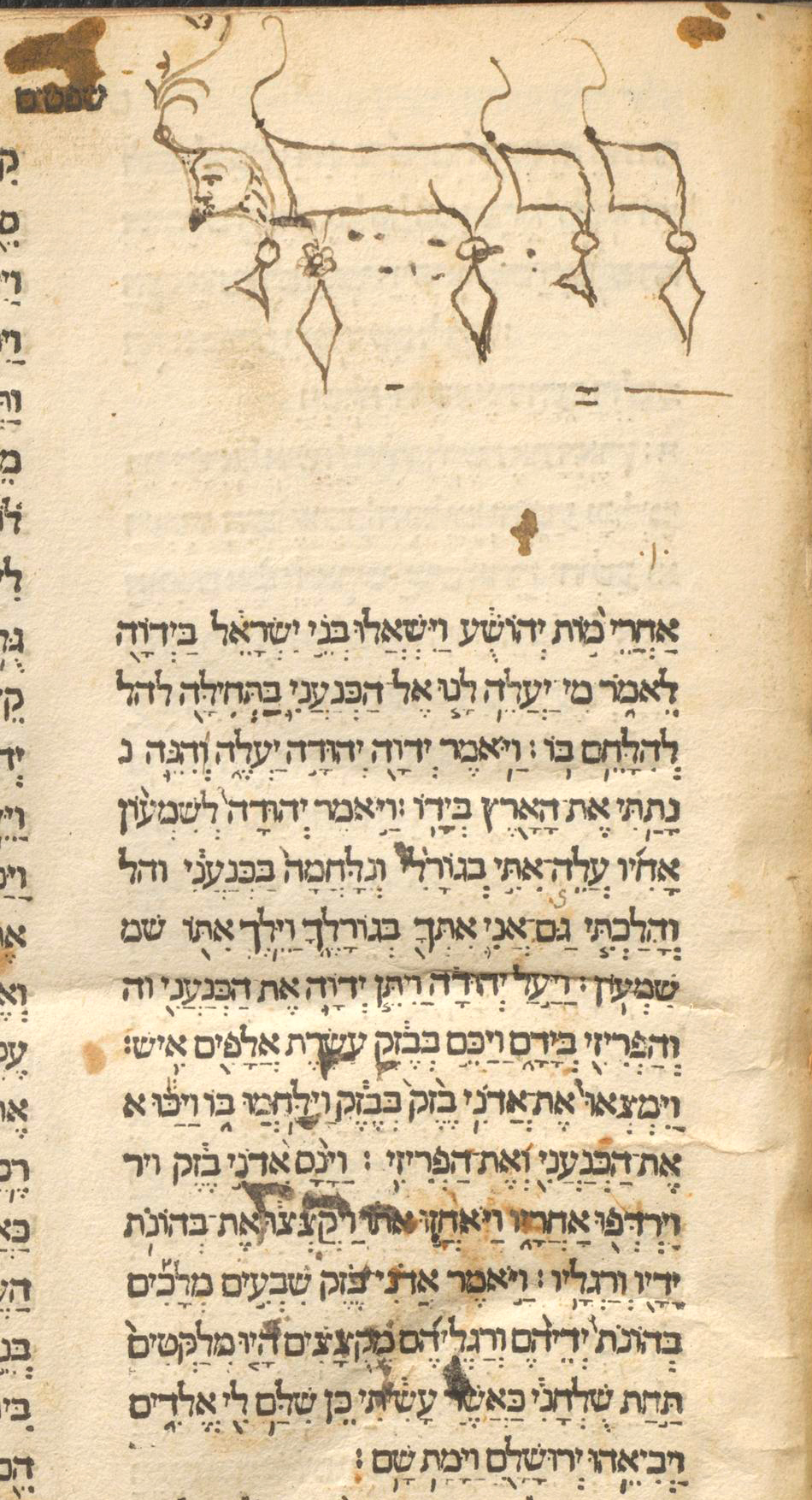
Detail view into a book from the Soncino press

All forms of Hebrew type were used in this period, the square, the Rashi or rabbinic (in which the first dated work was entirely printed), and the so-called "Weiberteutsch" (in which the later Yiddish works were printed); a primitive form of this last had already been used in the Psalms of 1477. Different sizes of type were used as early as the Arba'ah Turim of Piove di Sacco, which uses no less than three. The actual fonts have not yet been determined, and until this is done no adequate scientific treatment of the subject is possible. A beginning, however, has been made by Proctor. Generally speaking, a more rounded form was used in Spain and Portugal (perhaps under the influence of Arabic script) than in the Italian presses, whose types were somewhat Gothic in style. It has been conjectured that the Spanish printers used logotypes in addition to the single letters.

The Soncinos and Alantansis used initials, in other presses vacant spaces were left for them to be inserted by hand. Vowel-points were only used for Scripture or for prayer-books, and accents seem to have been inserted for the first time in the Bologna Pentateuch of 1482 (Pentateuch with Onkelos and Rashi printed by Abraham dei Tintori).

Special title-pages were rare; colophons were usually short. Borders were used by the Soncinos, as well as by Toledano at Lisbon and D'Ortas in the Ṭur of 1495 (see Borders; Colophon; Title-Page). Illustrations were only used in one book, Isaac ibn Sahula's Mashal ha-Kadmoni (1491). Printers' marks appear to have been used only in Spain and Portugal, each of the works produced in Hijar having a different mark. Of the number of copies printed for an edition the only detail known is that relating to the Psalms with Ḳimḥi in 1477, of which three hundred were printed. If this number applies to many of the incunabula, it is not surprising that they are extremely rare at the present day. Twenty of them exist only in a single copy; most of the rest are imperfect through misuse or have been disfigured by censors.

== Location of the books ==
A majority of the examples exist or existed in seven public libraries (British Museum, London; Columbia University, New York; Bibliothèque Nationale, Paris; Bodleian, Oxford; Frankfurt (Freimann Collection); Biblioteca Palatina, Parma; Asiatic Museum, St. Petersburg) and were part of seven or eight private collections (E. N. Adler, London; Dr. Chwolson, St. Petersburg; Dr. M. Gaster, London; Baron Günzburg, St. Petersburg; H. B. Levy, Hamburg, now Staats- und Universitätsbibliothek Hamburg; Mayer Sulzberger, Philadelphia). The numbers included in each of these collections are given in the following lists. The remaining locations are mentioned in the table only in sporadic instances, and do not profess to exhaust the incunabula contained in such collections as those of Amsterdam, Berlin, Breslau, Carlsruhe, Munich, etc. Dr. N. Porges of Leipzig and Dr. Simonsen of Copenhagen are also understood to have collections. see table

But few details are known as to the actual prices paid for some of these works. It would appear that Reuchlin paid three Rhine gulden for the Naples Naḥmanides of 1490 and the Former Prophets with Ḳimḥi (Soncino, 1485), and twice as much for the Soncino Bible of 1488. A note at the end of De Rossi's copy of the Guadalajara Ḳimḥi of 1482 states that three carline were paid for it in 1496 by the owner of that date.

== Choice of books ==
The subject-matter of the works selected for the honors of print was on the whole what might have been anticipated. First came the Bible text, either a part:

- Psalms, unpointed, Italy, before 1480
- Megillot with Rashi, Bologna 1482-83
- Faro Pentateuch Faro, Portugal 1487
- Pentateuch with Megillot, etc. Hijar 1490
- Psalms, Proverbs, Job Naples 1490
- Pentateuch with accents, Naples 1491
- Pentateuch with Megillot, etc. Brescia 1492
- Psalms, Brescia 1493
- Former Prophets, Leiria 1494

or the whole:

- Bible, Soncino 1488
- Bible, Naples 1491
- Bible with accents, Brescia 1494

A large number of Bible commentaries was printed, including those of Abraham ibn Ezra (Pentateuch, Naples 1488), Baḥya ben Asher (Pentateuch, Naples 1492), David Ḳimḥi (6, 22, 37, 40, 46, 83), David ibn Yaḥya (82), Immanuel of Rome (39), Levi b. Gershon (4, 11, 16), Naḥmanides (14, 59, 72), and Rashi (1, 12, 25, 28, 44, 48): some of the works contained a combination of commentaries (43, 65, 79, 88). Then came the Mishnah (86) and parts of the Talmud (29, 30, 56, 57, 58, 60, 90). As further aids to these were grammars (54, 85), Ḳimḥi's Bible lexicon (21, 73, 78), and the Talmud lexicon of Nathan b. Jehiel (13). Next in popularity to Bible and Talmud came the halakic works, especially the codes of Yaakov ben Asher (2, 3, 5, 27, 35, 45, 64, 67, 98)—the most popular single work—Maimonides (18, 71), and Moses de Coucy (15, 55), together with the "Agur" (89) and Kol Bo (69). To these may be added the solitary volume of responsa, that of Solomon ben Adret (17).

After law came prayers, of which a considerable number were printed (36, 41, 42, 47, 63, 95, 96, 97, 100); and to these may be added the tables of day durations (23)and Naḥmanides' "Sha'ar ha-Gemul" (70). Ethical works were moderately frequent (10, 31, 32, 53, 60, 61, 62, 66), which only two philosophical works received permanent form in print, Maimonides' "Moreh" (24), and Albo's "'Iḳḳarim" (38). Very few belletristic works appeared (75, 80); history is represented by Eldad ha-Dani (7) and the "Yosippon" (8); and science by Avicenna (81), in the most bulky Hebrew book printed in the fifteenth century. It is characteristic that the only book known to be printed during its author's lifetime was the "Nofet Ẓufim" of Judah b. Jehiel (9), one of the few Hebrew works showing the influence of the Renaissance. It is doubtful whether Landau's "Agur" was issued during the author's life-time, though it may have been printed with the aid of his son Abraham, who was a compositor in Naples at the time. Very few works went into a second edition, Maḥzor Romi (36, 42, 95) and the tractate Beẓah (30, 90) being the chief exceptions. The reprinting of Beẓah seems to show that this treatise was the one selected then, as it is now, for initial instruction in the Talmud.

As regards the second class of incunabula of Jewish interest—such as were printed in other languages than Hebrew—these have never before been treated, and only a few specimens can be here referred to. They deal with topics of controversial interest, as the "Contra Perfidos Judeos" of Peter Schwarz (Eslingen, 1475), his "Stella Meschiah" (ib. 1477), and the well-known "Epistle" of Samuel of Morocco (Cologne, 1493). Two earlier tractates deal with the legend of Simon of Trent (Hain, Nos. 7,733, 15,658), while there exists in Munich an illustrated broadside relating to the blood accusation at Passau, printed as early as 1470. Folz's "Die Rechnung Kolpergers von dem Gesuch die Juden" (Nuremberg, 1491; Hain, No. 7,210) may also be referred to. Chief among the incunabula of this kind, however, are those of Latin translations of the medieval Jewish scientists and philosophers, as that of Abraham ibn Ezra, "De Nativitatibus" (1485, Venice), of Bonet de Latis, Astronomy (1493, Rome), of Maimonides, Aphorisms (Bologna; Hain, No. 10,524), and of Israeli, "De Particularibus Diæctis" (Padua, 1487). One of the most interesting of Latin incunabula is the version of Abraham Zacuto's tables (Almanach perpetuum Celestium Motuum – a set of astronomical tables providing information to perform various types of astronomical calculations) published in Leiria by Abraham d'Ortas (1496).

== Bibliography ==
- Adler, Elkan Nathan (1923), Talmud Printing Before Bomberg,” pp. 81-84 in, Festskrift I Anledning af Professor David Simonsens 70-aarige Fødelsdag, Copenhagen
- Ohly, Kurt; Sack, Vera (1967). Inkunabelkatalog der Stadt- und Universitätsbibliothek und anderer öffentlicher Sammlungen in Frankfurt am Main (in German). Frankfurt am Main: Klostermann.
