= Faro Pentateuch =

The Faro Pentateuch is the first printed book published in Portugal, printed in 1487.

It was printed in Hebrew, and published by a Jew, Samuel Gacon in Faro, in southern Portugal, after he had fled from the Spanish Inquisition.

The only surviving copy is in the British Library in London.

== See also ==
- Hebrew incunabula
