= Yakir Ben Moshe =

Israeli poet

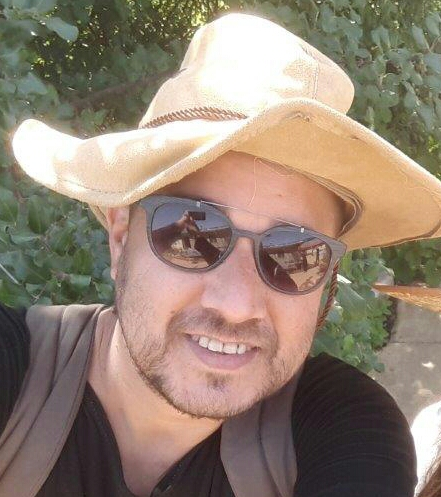
- Native name: יקיר בן-משה
- Born: 1973 (age 51–52); Israel
- Occupation: Poet, Editor
- Years active: 2000–present
- Notable works: Every Morning at Least One Blond Guy Becomes Bald
- Notable awards: Culture Minister's Prize (2003)

Yakir Ben Moshe (Hebrew: יקיר בן-משה; Born 1973) is an Israeli poet and, since 2000, editor of Beit Bialik, Tel Aviv. His first book, Every Morning at Least One Blond Guy Becomes Bald, was published in 2003 and won the Culture Minister's prize the same year.
