= Soncino family =

15th-century Italian Jewish printers

The Soncino family (Hebrew: משפחת שונצינו, romanized: Mishpokhat Sontsino) was a family of Italian Ashkenazi Jewish printers deriving its name from the town of Soncino, Lombardy in the duchy of Milan. It traces its descent through Moses of Fürth, who is mentioned in 1455, back to Moses of Speyer of the middle of the fourteenth century. The first member of the family to engage in printing was Israel Nathan b. Samuel, the father of Joshua Moses and the grandfather of Gershon. He set up his Hebrew printing press in Soncino in 1483, and published his first work, the tractate Berakot, on 19 December 1483. The press underwent considerable changes during its existence. It can be traced at Soncino in 1483-86; Casalmaggiore, 1486; Soncino again, 1488–90; Naples, 1490–92; Brescia, 1491–1494; Barco, 1494–97; Fano, 1503–6; Pesaro, 1507–20 (with intervals at Fano, 1516, and Ortona, 1519); Rimini, 1521–26. Members of the family were at Constantinople between 1530 and 1533, and had a branch establishment in Salonica in 1532-33. Their printer's mark was a tower.

The last of the Soncinos was Gershom b. Eliezer, a grandson of Gershom b. Moses, who established the first printing press in the Middle East in Cairo c. 1557. The mere transfer of their workshop must have had a good deal to do with the development of the printing art among the Jews, both in Italy and in Turkey. While they devoted their main attention to Hebrew books, they also published a considerable number of works in general literature, as well as religious works featuring Christian symbols.

The Soncino prints, though not the earliest, excelled all the others in their perfection of type and their correctness. The Soncino house is also notable for being the location where the first Hebrew Bible was printed. An allusion to the forthcoming publication of this edition was made by the type-setter of the "Sefer HaIkkarim" (1485), who, on page 45, parodied Isa. ii. 3 thus: "Out of Zion shall go forth the Law, and the word of the Lord from Soncino". Abraham b. Hayyim's name appears in the Bible edition as typesetter, and the correctors included Solomon b. Perez Bonfoi ("Mibhar ha-Peninim"), Gabriel Strassburg (Berakot), David b. Elijah Levi and Mordecai b. Reuben Baselea (Hullin), and Eliezer b. Samuel ("Yad").

== Family members ==
=== Israel Nathan b. Samuel b. Moses Soncino ===
Died at Brescia, probably in 1492. He wrote the Epilogue for the Mahzor of 1486. It was at his suggestion that his son Joshua Soncino took up the work of printing.

=== Joshua Solomon b. Israel Nathan Soncino ===
Printer at Soncino from 1483 to 1488, at Naples from 1490 to 1492. He was the uncle of Gershon Soncino. It would appear that he had most to do with starting the printing of the Talmud.

=== Gershon b. Moses Soncino ===
(in Italian works, Jeronimo Girolima Soncino; in Latin works, Hieronymus Soncino):

The most important member of the family; born probably at Soncino; died at Constantinople 1534. The earliest printed Talmuds, though incomplete, were published by the Soncino family, especially Gershon, who established the printing conventions for the Talmud that were followed by Daniel Bomberg and subsequent printers.

Gershon says he was of great assistance to the exiles from Spain, and especially to those from Portugal; and he made journeys to France in order to collect manuscripts for the works to be printed. He makes a pun upon his name by printing it as two words, "Ger Sham," referring to his many travels. In dedicating his edition of Petrarch (Fano, 1503) to Cæsar Borgia, he mentions that he had had Latin, Greek, and Hebrew types cut out by Francesco da Bologna, who is credited also with having made the cursive types attributed to Aldus Manutius. It is curious that Aldus, for his introduction to a Hebrew grammar (Venice, 1501), used the same types that had been employed by Soncino in 1492.

=== Eliezar b. Gershon Soncino ===
Printer between 1534 and 1547. He completed "Miklol" (finished in 1534), the publication of which had been begun by his father, and published "Meleket ha-Mispar" in 1547; and Isaac b. Sheshet's responsa, likewise in 1547.

=== Gershom b. Eliezer Soncino ===
Moved to Cairo c. 1550, where he established the first printing press of the Middle East. His activities are known solely from two fragments discovered in the Cairo Genizah, dating to 1557 and 1562.

=== Moses Soncino ===
Printer at Salonica in 1526 and 1527; assisted in the printing of the Catalonian Mahzor and of the first part of the Yalkut.

== See also ==
- Hebrew incunabula
- Early editions of the Hebrew Bible
- Daniel Bomberg's Publication of the Babylonian Talmud (1519-23) adopted the format created by Joshua Solomon Soncino, with the Talmud text in the middle of the page and the commentaries of Rashi and Tosfot surrounding it. Published with the approval of Pope Leo X, this edition became the standard format, which all later editions have followed.
