= Eyal ben-Moshe (Eyal B) =

Israeli animator

- אייל בן-משה
- Born: 12 September 1974 (age 52); Israel
- Occupations: Animator, director, screenwriter, comic book artist, designer
- Known for: Animation, TV series, comic books
- Notable work: Munch, The Green Project, Eretz Nehederet

Eyal Ben-Moshe (Eyal B) (Hebrew: אייל בן-משה; born 12 September 1974) is an Israeli animator, director, screenwriter, comic book artist, and designer. In 1991, at 16, he, along with Yaron Niski and Amitai Sandy, published an avant-garde Israeli comics magazine, Penguin's Perversion. The magazine featured wild, dark humor with undertones of satire and social criticism. A continuous story from the magazine, called The Passive Vampire, also created by Eyal, was later published as its own title.

Ben-Moshe received recognition after creating the TV animation series Munch, broadcast as part of the late-night show Night Butterfly on Channel 2. In 2000, he co-created Studio Eyal B with Tedy Production Company, producing shows such as The Show with the Dolls (Ha'tochnit Eem Ha-Boobot), Mister Motek, and Avishai Ha-Hores, a sub-segment of the show Y in 10 for YES Broadcasting Company. Other projects included The Goozniks for Channel 24, an animated episode for The Pajamas on Channel 6, and music videos for Dana Berger and Kele 6. In 2008, Eyal designed and produced the animation for Bago Dago, Israel's first animated virtual band.

Since 2013, Ben-Moshe has been working on the popular Israeli comedy show "Eretz Nehederet" on Israel Channel 2, creating original green screen sketches, including parodies of Star Wars and Game of Thrones. He has also directed, co-written, and designed characters for the WantaFanta animated TV campaign for Fanta. In 2014, Eyal was involved in Simcha Jacobovici's TV production Biblical Conspiracies, which aired on the Discovery Channel and the Science Channel. In 2026, he created an A.I. video for the State of Israel’s social channels, which depicted a rapper whose visual identity was stolen from British rapper IAMDDB without her knowledge or consent. IAMDDB condemned the use of her likeness and after widespread controversy the video was removed. Commenters noted the ironic use of a stolen image in a video regarding stolen land. Ben-Moshe’s comments on the issue were also widely condemned, as there was a perceived failure to comprehend the issue with co-opting of a black woman’s identity to make a video about colonisation.

== Early life ==
Since his teenage years, Eyal has been conceptualizing and creating comics and animation. In 1991, when he was only 16, Eyal (Along with Yaron niski and Amitai Sandy) published an Avant-Garde Israeli comic's magazine named "Penguin's perversion". A seemingly wild, dark humor magazine with an underline of satire and social criticism. A continues story from the magazine, called "The passive vampire" also created by Eyal, was later published as its own title, dedicated to all the chapters of the story published in the magazine.

== Career ==
Eyal received recognition after creating the TV animation series Munch, a show that was broadcast as part as the popular late night show Night butterfly on Channel 2, some of the most famous bits in the show were nostalgic animated pieces, dedicated to old TV shows that were popular in the 1980s. Under Eyal's point of view, they received new identities, The Smurfs became "Dardasatla" (a play on the word Smurfs and "getting high" in Hebrew) and The Heart ("Narco", a play on the main character's name, Marco)

In 2000, Eyal was the co-creator, along with Tedy Production Company, of Studio Eyal B. The studio produced an extensive list of shows such as "The show with the dolls" (Ha'tochnit Eem Ha-Boobot), "Mister Motek", the parody "Avishai Ha-Hores", a sub-segment of the show "Y in 10" for YES Broadcasting company, "The goozniks" (Hagoozinikim) for Channel 24, The Israeli Music Channel, and an animated episode for "The pajamas" a popular TV show on Channel 6 – The Israeli Children's channel. Also, A music video for the song "King's path" by the group "Kele 6" and a music video for the song "Bombei" by Dana Berger. In 2008, Eyal designed the characters and produced the animation video for "Bago Dago", the first-ever animated virtual band in Israel, covering famous rhythm & Blues and Hip hop tunes with Hebrew lyrics. He produced three animated music videos for the band: "Ten la" (A cover for the song "Smack that" by Eminem and Akon), "Arab Boyfriend (In Hebrew: Chaver Aravi)" (A cover for the song "American boy" By Kanye West and Estelle) and "Hello, Hello", an original song.

In 2010, Eyal cooperated with Gaga Production Company to create TV and web commercials as well as original animated shows. Between the years 2011–2012, Eyal created and directed two seasons of the sketch comedy "The Green Project", produced by the Israeli Comedy central Channel, for "Hot" Cable and broadcast company. The uniqueness of the series comes from the method which it was filmed, first on a green screen and only than mashed with whimsical and fantasy-like cartoons, backgrounds and animation mixed with live shots. The show was sold to a variety of Channels in countries outside of Israel such as Norway and Argentina. One of the major channels it was sold to is the Chinese Hunan TV channel, a top channel with over 60 million viewers.

Since 2013 and still ongoing, Eyal works for the most popular comedy show in Israel, "Eretz Nehederet" on Channel 2 flagship show, creating original green screen sketches, such as Star Wars Parody and Game of Thrones parody Nowadays and since 2014, Eyal is working on an independent project of an animated science fiction comedy. He directed, co-wrote, and designed the characters for the WantaFanta animated TV campaign, for Fanta, the Coca-Cola brand. On 2014, Eyal was also part of Simcha Jacobovici TV production "Biblical conspiracies", aired on the American Discovery Channel, Science channel and more. In 2015, one of Eyals videos went viral, a green screen wedding proposal he created, an epic production that earned tens of thousands and likes and shares on line and got TV exposure

== Nominations ==
- In 2012, the Green Project show was nominated for the Israeli Emmy award on the "Best entertainment show" category
- In 2014, Eyal B was nominated for the Video Art and special effects category for his role in the satire ketch show "Erez Nehederet"

== See also ==
- איל B
- The Green Project
