= Elijah ben Moses Gershon Zahalon =

Eighteenth-century Jewish Talmudist

Elijah ben Moses Gershon Ẓahalon of Pinczow was an eighteenth-century Jewish Talmudist, mathematician and physician living in Pińczów, Russian Poland.

In 1758 he published Ma'aneh Eliyahu, novellae on Baba Meẓi'a and Beẓah, decisions, and responsa. That same year he published Ir Ḥeshbon, on arithmetic and algebra, the first part of his most notable mathematical work, Meleket Maḥshebet. The second part, Berure Middot, on geometry, would be published in 1765.

He also wrote Hadrat Eliyahu (1786), ten homilies on Talmudic subjects, Nibḥar me-Ḥaruẓ, a compendium of Joseph Albo's Iḳḳarim in the form of dialogues, and edited She' elot u-Teshubot Geone Batra'e (1795), a collection of responsa of Yom-Tov Lipmann Heller, Joel Sirkes, Joshua Falk, and others.
