= Isaac ben Moses Arama =

15th-century Spanish rabbi and author

Isaac ben Moses Arama (c. 1420 – 1494) was a Spanish rabbi and author. He was at first principal of a rabbinical academy at Zamora (probably his birthplace); then he received a call as rabbi and preacher from the community at Tarragona, and later from that of Fraga in Aragon. He officiated finally in Calatayud as rabbi and head of the Talmudical academy. Upon the expulsion of the Jews in 1492, Arama settled in Naples, where he died in 1494.

== Writings and thought ==
Arama is the author of Aḳedat Yitzchaḳ (Binding of Isaac), a lengthy philosophical commentary on the Pentateuch, homiletic in style. From this work he is frequently spoken of as the "Ba'al 'Aḳedah" (author of the Aḳedah). He also wrote a commentary upon the Five Scrolls, and a work called Ḥazut Ḳashah (A Difficult Vision), upon the relation of philosophy to theology; also Yad Abshalom (The Hand of Absalom), a commentary on Proverbs, written in memory of his son-in-law, Absalom, who died shortly after his marriage.

Arama was the very prototype of the Spanish-Jewish scholar of the second half of the fifteenth century. First of all he was a Talmudist. The study of the Talmud was of the utmost importance to him; so that he lamented deeply when his rabbinical pupils could not follow him from Zamora to Tarragona, because the latter community was unable to support them. In the next place, he was a philosopher. The study of philosophy was so universal in Spain at that period that no one could assume a public position who had not devoted himself to it. Arama had paid particular attention to Maimonides; but independent philosophical thought is hardly to be found in his work. His remarks concerning the nature of the soul (Aḳedah, chapter 6) are noteworthy. After a detailed account of the various theories about the soul which had prevailed, he comes to the conclusion that the first germ of the soul, common to the whole human race, has its origin with and in the body. His theory is that of Alexander of Aphrodisias—that the soul is the "form" of the organic body—but Arama is able to adduce support for it from Talmud and Kabbalah. The third element in Arama's mental composition was Kabbalah as expounded in the Zohar, which he believed to have been written by Simeon bar Yohai. He did not, however, occupy himself so much with the mystical side of Kabbalah as with its philosophy.

His earliest work, the Ḥazut Ḳashah, presenting in a certain sense an enunciation of Arama's religious philosophy, includes also much that is interesting pertaining to the history of the Jews in Spain prior to their expulsion. The aim of the work was to furnish a rejoinder to the missionary sermons of the Church, to which, under the laws then prevalent, the Jews were compelled to listen. Hence his polemic against the Christian dogma of Grace is the résumé of an oral disputation between Arama and a Christian scholar. In support of his attack upon this Christian dogma, Arama adduces the doctrine of the freedom of the will as formulated by Aristotle, and the consideration of God's transcendent justice, which would make Grace to consist of nothing but the exercise of the will of a despot. Besides this instance of his polemics, his treatment of the Deluge contains several attacks upon Christianity. The greater portion of the work, however, is devoted to the confutation of that philosophy which refuses to recognize Jewish revelation, or recognizes it only as identical with philosophy.
