= Paris in the 16th century =

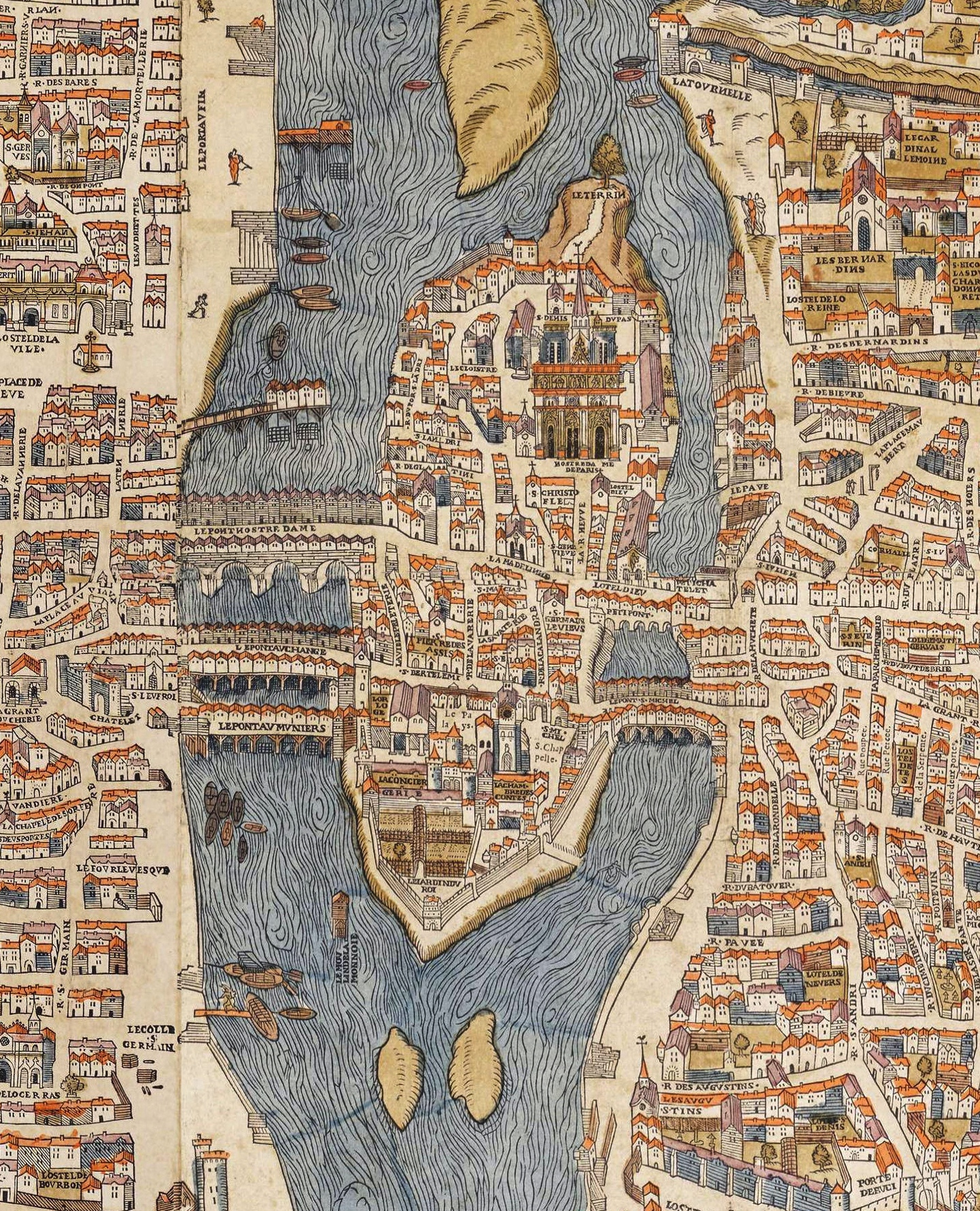
The center of Paris in 1550, by Olivier Truschet and Germain Hoyau.

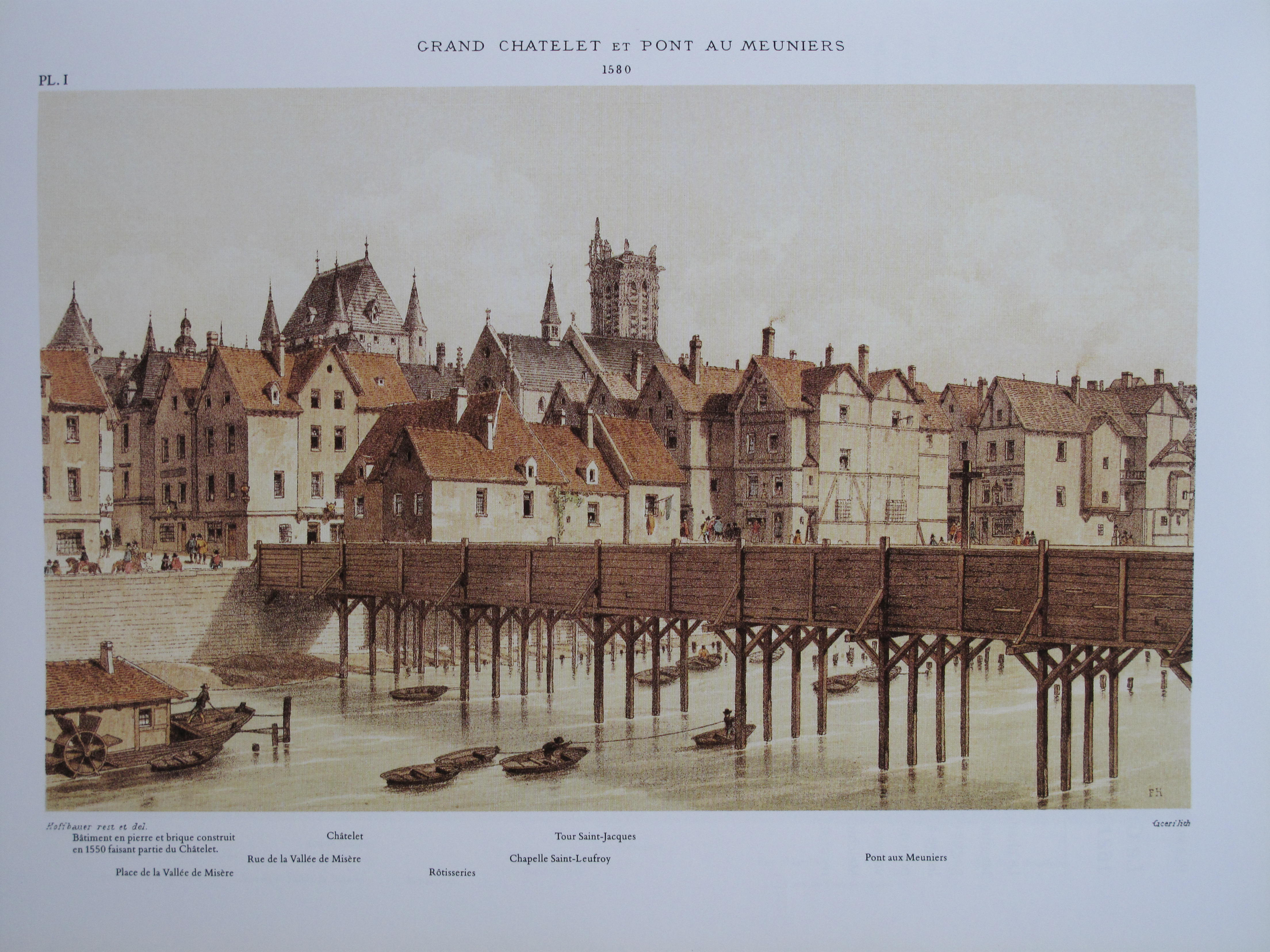
The Pont aux Meuniers, or miller's bridge, in 1580 19th century engraving by Hoffbrauer.

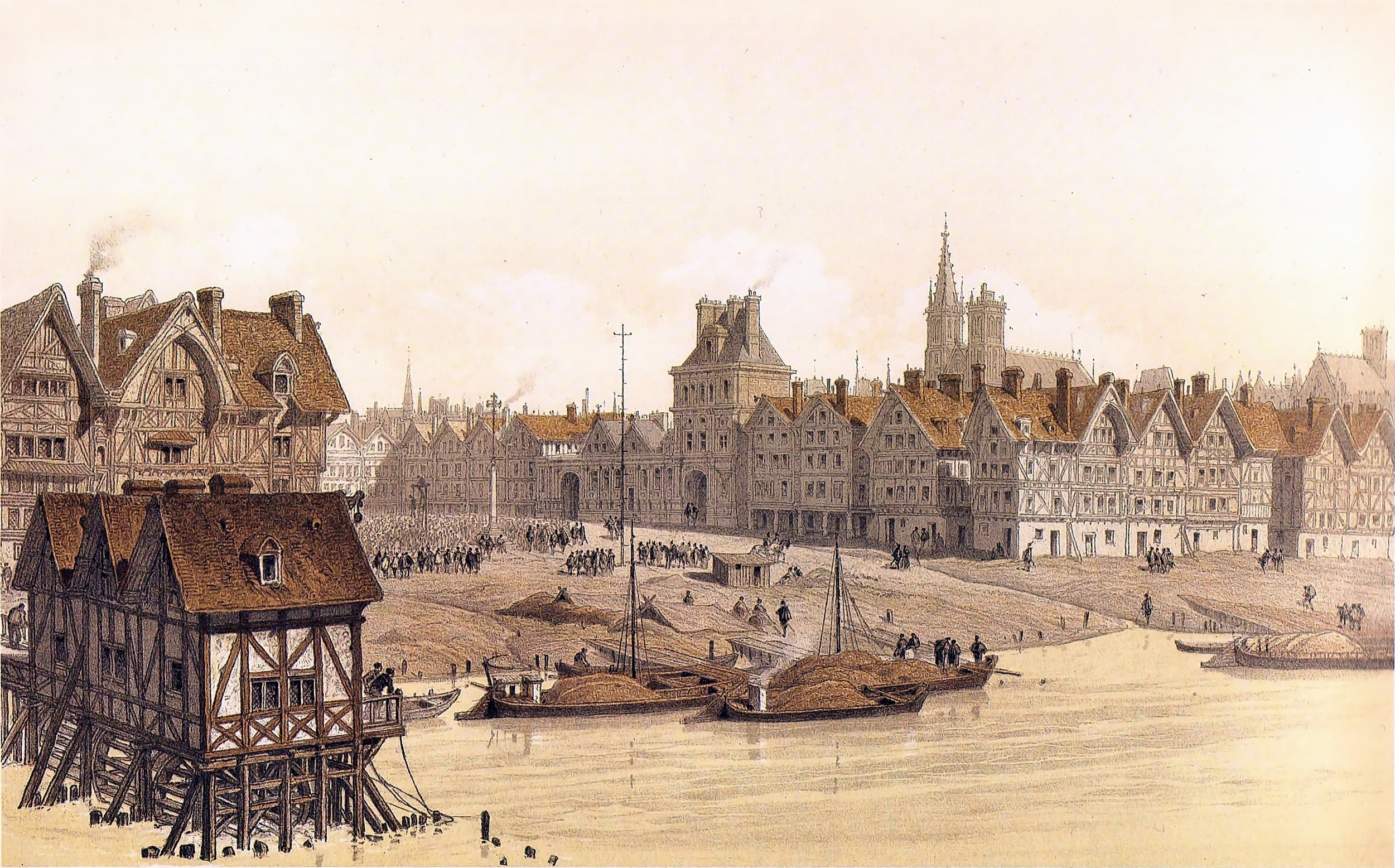
The Hotel de Ville of Paris in 1583 - 19th-century engraving by Hoffbrauer

During the 16th century, Paris was the largest city in Europe, with a population of about 350,000 in 1550.

The 16th century saw the Renaissance arrive in Paris, expressed in the city's architecture, art and cultural life. The kings of France returned to Paris from the Loire Valley. In 1534, Francis I became the first French king to make the Louvre his residence.

Under King Francis I, the Renaissance style of architecture, imported from Italy, was widely used in churches and public buildings, replacing the Gothic style. Paris landmarks built during the 16th century include the Tuileries Palace, the Fontaine des Innocents, the Lescot wing of the Louvre; the church of Saint-Eustache (1532); and the Hôtel Carnavalet, begun in 1545, now the museum of the history of Paris.

During the century, Paris was the second most important centre of book publishing in Europe, after Venice. The University of Paris devoted its attentions largely to fighting the Protestant heresy, the king founded the Collège de France as a new centre of learning independent of the university.

Tensions between Protestants and Catholics grew, culminating in the St. Bartholomew's Day massacre in 1572, when several thousand Protestants were killed in the streets by Catholic mobs. At the end of the century, Henry IV was able to return to Paris as King, and permitted Protestants to open churches outside the city. Urban innovation in Paris during the 16th century included the first street lighting, by candles. The first theatre opened in Paris in 1548, and the first ballet performance took place at the French court in 1581.

== Events ==
=== A capital without a king ===
At the beginning of the 16th century Paris was officially the capital of France, but the king, Louis XI, had little trust in the Parisians, and resided in the chateaux of the Loire valley, rarely visiting the city. The population had grown from 100,000 in 1422 to 150,000 in 1500. The traditional trade routes to the north and by river to the sea, closed during the wars of the 15th century, were opened again.

Despite the renewed commerce, the economy of the city was struggling. Thousands of jobs had been lost in the decline of the textile industry. The number of master weavers in Paris had dropped from 360 in 1300 to 42 in 1481. The growth of the industries of silk manufacture and of fabric dyeing created some new jobs, but not enough. Since the court no longer resided in Paris, the luxury trades, making jewelry, clocks, furs, furniture and other luxury products, also suffered. Paris became a city of government clerks, lawyers, accountants, and other royal officials, working for the courts, the Parliament, the Treasury, the mint, the city administration, and other royal offices. Bourgeois Parisians bought government positions as a route to prestige, fortune and nobility.

=== The Paris of Francis and Henry III ===
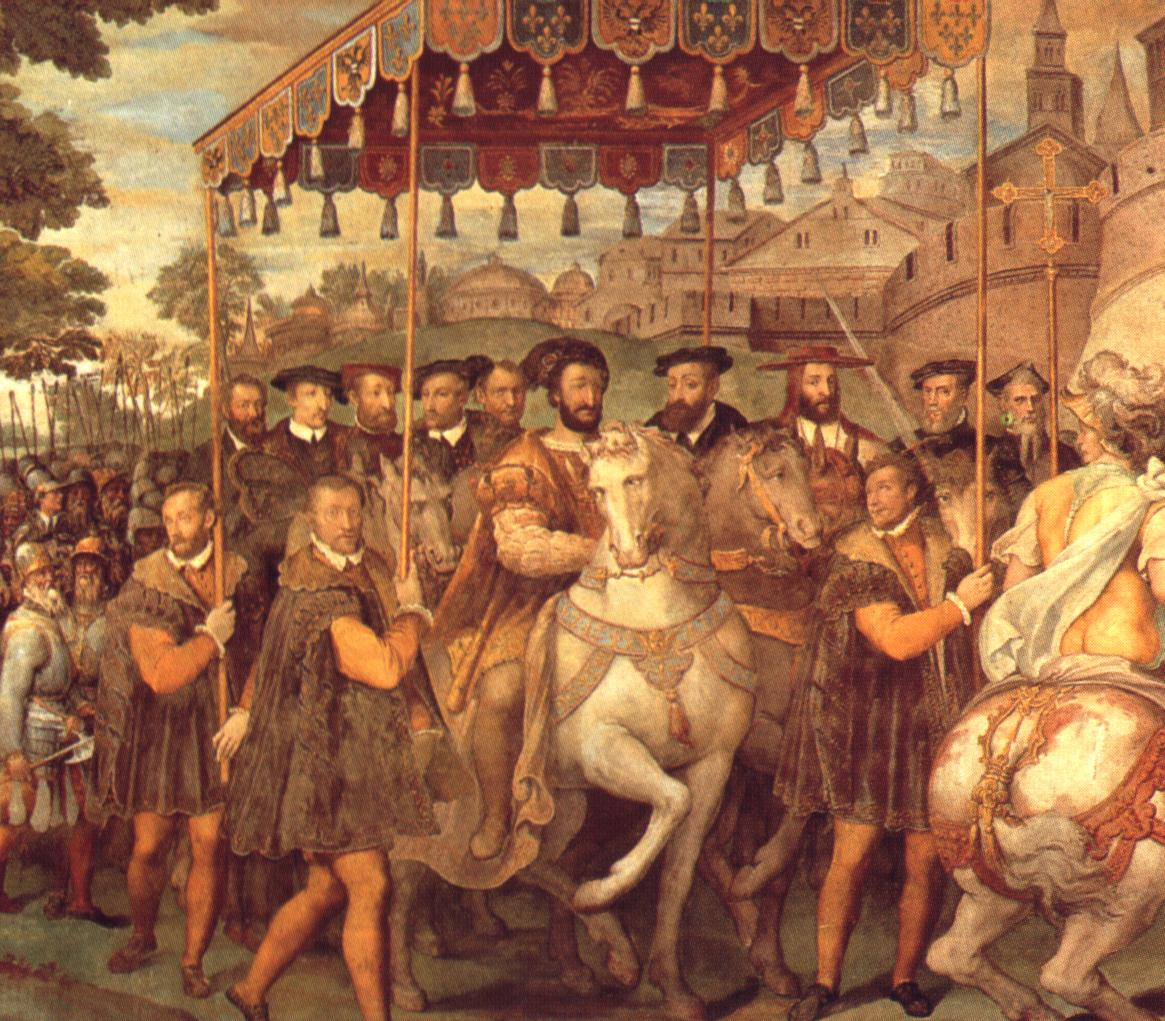
Francis I welcomes Emperor Charles V to Paris (1540)

Louis XI died in 1483, and his successors, Charles VIII and Louis XII, also chose to live in the Loire Valley. Louis XII died in 1515 without a male heir, and was succeeded by his cousin, Francis I, who was much more interested in the city. Francis gradually moved closer to Paris, first to the Palace of Fontainebleau, then to Saint-Germain-en-Laye, then to the Chateau de Madrid, an enormous hunting lodge that he built in the Bois de Boulogne. Finally, on 15 March 1528, he declared his intention to live in Paris. Since the old royal palace on the Île-de-la-Cité was occupied by the Parlement of Paris, he announced that he would live in the Louvre.

By the time of Francois I, the Louvre had long been associated with the French monarchy. It had served as a royal palace since the beginning of the fourteenth century and had enjoyed favor under Charles V of France, who paid the architect Raymond du Temple to transform the castle of Philip Augustus into a primary residence and show-place for his rule. Du Temple heightened the building, added a new suite of domestic chambers, and transferred the majority of the king's extensive book collection to its two-story library. A century and a half of neglect, however, had left Charles V's Louvre dilapidated and stylistically out of keeping with contemporary tastes, and Francis I enjoined Pierre Lescot to once again update the structure. Lescot tore down the massive central keep, or tower, to give more light to the square courtyard, and widened the windows. He then built a new wing, decorated in the new Renaissance style imported from Italy. The new wing designed by Lescot became a model for French Renaissance buildings throughout France. Francis I moved into the Louvre in 1534. While the Louvre was being rebuilt, Francis I resided at the Hôtel des Tournelles, near the Bastille, in a house that the kings used when passing through Paris.

As he built his palace, Francis I commissioned in 1532 the construction of a new city hall for the City of Paris, designed by a master of the Italian Renaissance, Domenico da Cortona, also in the new Renaissance style. The King himself came several times to the unfinished city hall building to the assembly of Paris merchants, appealing for funds for his military campaigns. The new building was not finished until 1628.

Francis I strengthened the position of Paris as a center of learning and scholarship. In 1500, there were seventy-five printing houses in Paris, second only to Venice. During the 16th century, Paris became first in Europe in book publishing. In 1530, Francis I created a new faculty at the University of Paris with the mission of teaching Hebrew, Greek and mathematics. It became the Collège de France. In 1540, the Jesuit order established its first schools in Paris. In 1549, the first textbook of the French language, La Défense et illustration de la langue française, by Joachim du Bellay, was published.

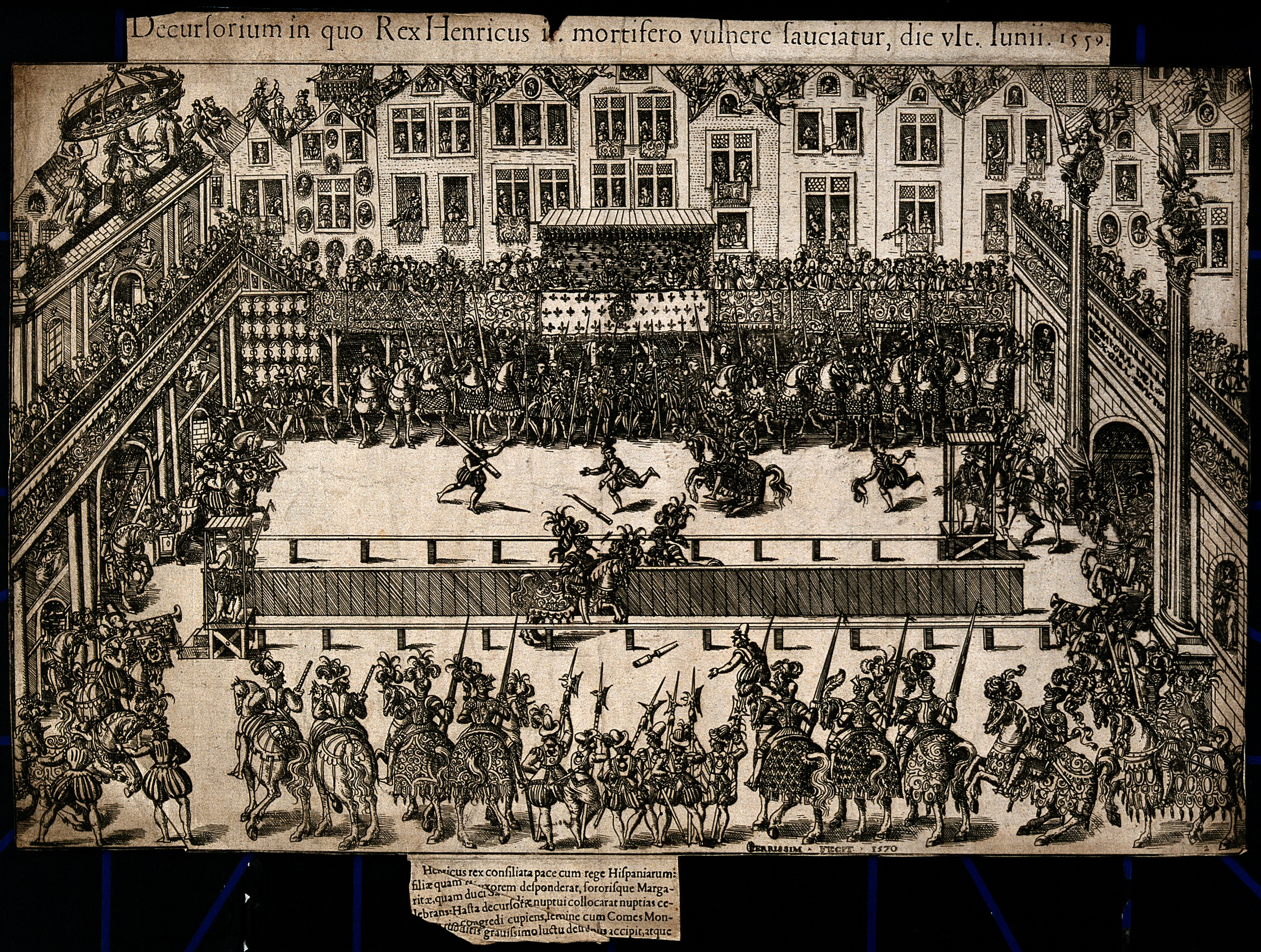
The tournament at the Hotel des Tournelles in 1559 at which King Henry II was accidentally killed

Francis I died in 1547. His son, Henry II, made his official entrance into Paris in 1549 with a lavish procession and ceremony; the first Renaissance fountain in the city, the Fontaine des Innocents, was commissioned as a tribute to the King's arrival. Henry continued the grand projects begun by Francis I. He built the Pavillon du Roi, a massive construction at the southwest corner of the Louvre, where his apartment was placed on the first floor. On the ground floor inside the Lescot Wing, he built a lavish new hall for ceremonies, the Salle des Cariatides. He also began construction of a new wall around the growing city, which was not finished until the reign of Louis XIII.

Henry II died 10 July 1559 from wounds suffered while jousting at his residence at the Hôtel des Tournelles. His widow, Catherine de Medicis, had the old residence demolished in 1563. In 1612, construction began on the Place des Vosges, one of the oldest planned squares in Paris. Between 1564 and 1572 she constructed a new royal residence, the Tuileries Palace perpendicular to the Seine, just outside the wall built by Charles V around the city. To the west of the palace she created a large Italian-style garden, the Jardin des Tuileries. She abruptly abandoned the palace in 1574, due to the prophecy of an astrologer that she would die close to the church of Saint-Germain, or Saint-Germain-l'Auxerois. She began building a new palace on rue de Viarmes, near Les Halles, but it was never finished, and all that remains is a single column.

=== Henry III and the Saint Bartholomew's Day Massacre ===
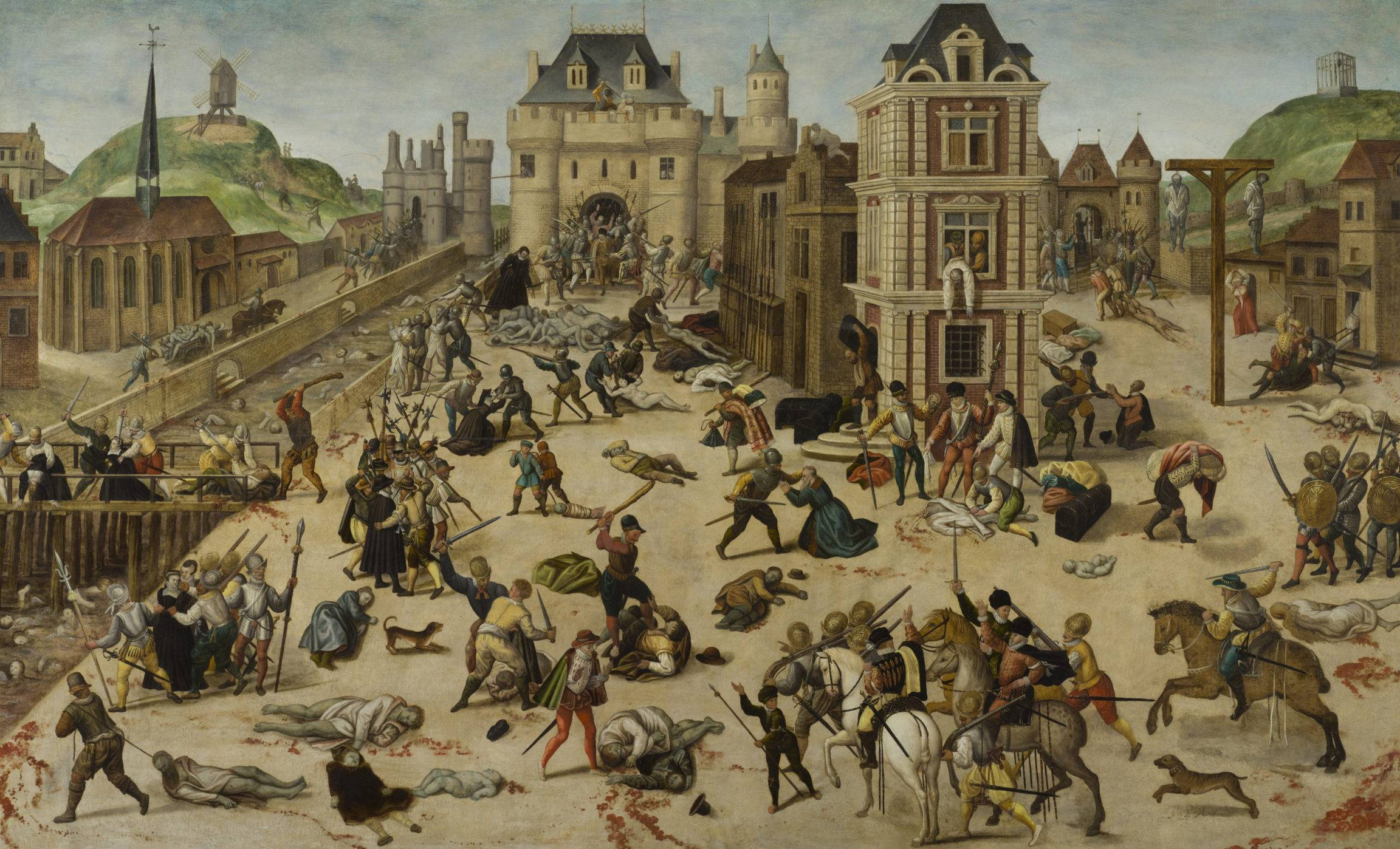
Contemporary painting of the St. Bartholomew's Day massacre by François Dubois

The second part of the 16th century in Paris was largely dominated by what became known as the French Wars of Religion (1562–1598). During the 1520s, the writings of Martin Luther began to circulate in the city, and the doctrines known as Calvinism attracted many followers, especially among the French upper classes. The Sorbonne and University of Paris, the major fortresses of Catholic orthodoxy, fiercely attacked the Protestant and humanist doctrines. The scholar Etienne Dolet was burned at the stake, along with his books, on place Maubert in 1546, on the orders of the theology faculty of the Sorbonne; and many others followed, but the new doctrines continued to grow in popularity.

Henry II was succeeded briefly by Francis II, who reigned from 1559 to 1560; then by Charles IX, from 1560 to 1574, who, under the guidance of their mother, Catherine de Medici, tried at times to reconcile Catholics and Protestants. and at other times, to eliminate them completely, in a long struggle known as the French Wars of Religion (1562–1598). Paris was the stronghold of the Catholic League. On the night of 23–24 August 1572, while many prominent Protestants from all over France were in Paris on the occasion of the marriage of Henri of Navarre—the future Henry IV—to Margaret of Valois, sister of Charles IX, the royal council decided to assassinate the leaders of the Protestants. The targeted killings quickly turned into a general slaughter of Protestants by Catholic mobs, known as St. Bartholomew's Day massacre, and continued through August and September, spreading from Paris to the rest of the country. About three thousand Protestants were massacred by mobs in the streets of Paris, and five to ten thousand elsewhere in France.

=== Henry IV and Siege of Paris ===
After the death of Charles IX, Henry III attempted to find a peaceful solution, which caused the Catholic party to distrust him. He attempted to show the strength of his faith to the skeptical Parisians and had himself whipped in the streets in the course of a religious procession, but this simply scandalized the Parisians. The King was forced to flee Paris by Duke of Guise and his ultra-Catholic followers on 12 May 1588, the so-called Day of the Barricades. On 1 August 1589 Henry III was assassinated in the Château de Saint-Cloud by a Dominican friar, Jacques Clément, bringing the Valois line to an end.

Paris, along with the other towns of the Catholic League, refused to accept the authority of the new King, Henry IV, a Protestant, who had succeeded Henry III. Henry first defeated the ultra-Catholic army at the battle of Ivry on 14 March 1590, and then proceeded to lay siege to Paris. The siege was long and unsuccessful; to end it, Henry IV agreed to convert to Catholicism, with the famous (but perhaps apocryphal) expression "Paris is well worth a Mass". On 14 March 1594 Henry IV entered Paris, after having been crowned King of France at the cathedral of Chartres on 27 February 1594.

Once he was established in Paris, Henry did all that he could to re-establish peace and order in the city, and to win the approval of the Parisians. He permitted the Protestants to open churches far from the center of the city, continued work on the Pont Neuf, and began to plan two Renaissance-style residential squares, Place Dauphine and Place des Vosges, which were not built until the 17th century.

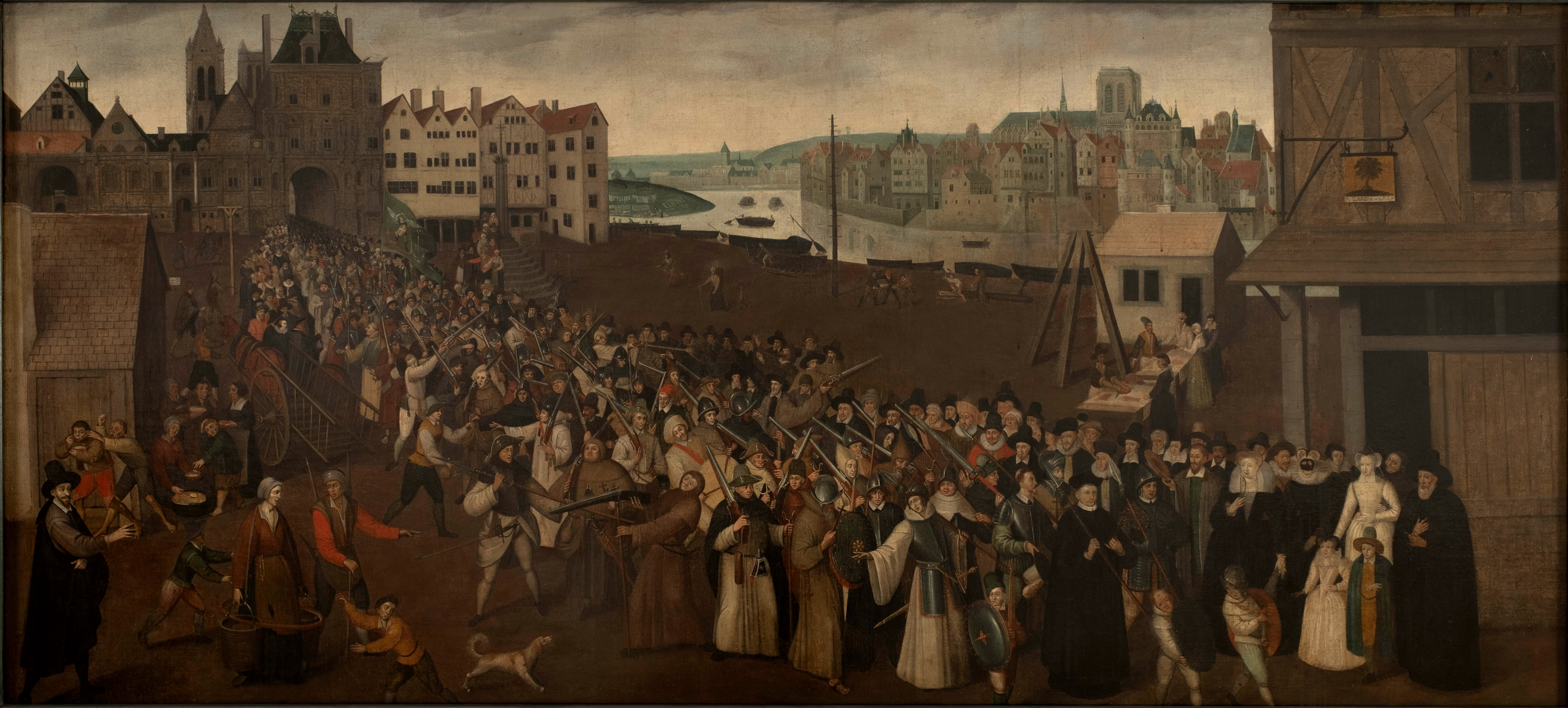
An armed procession of the Catholic League in Paris (1590)

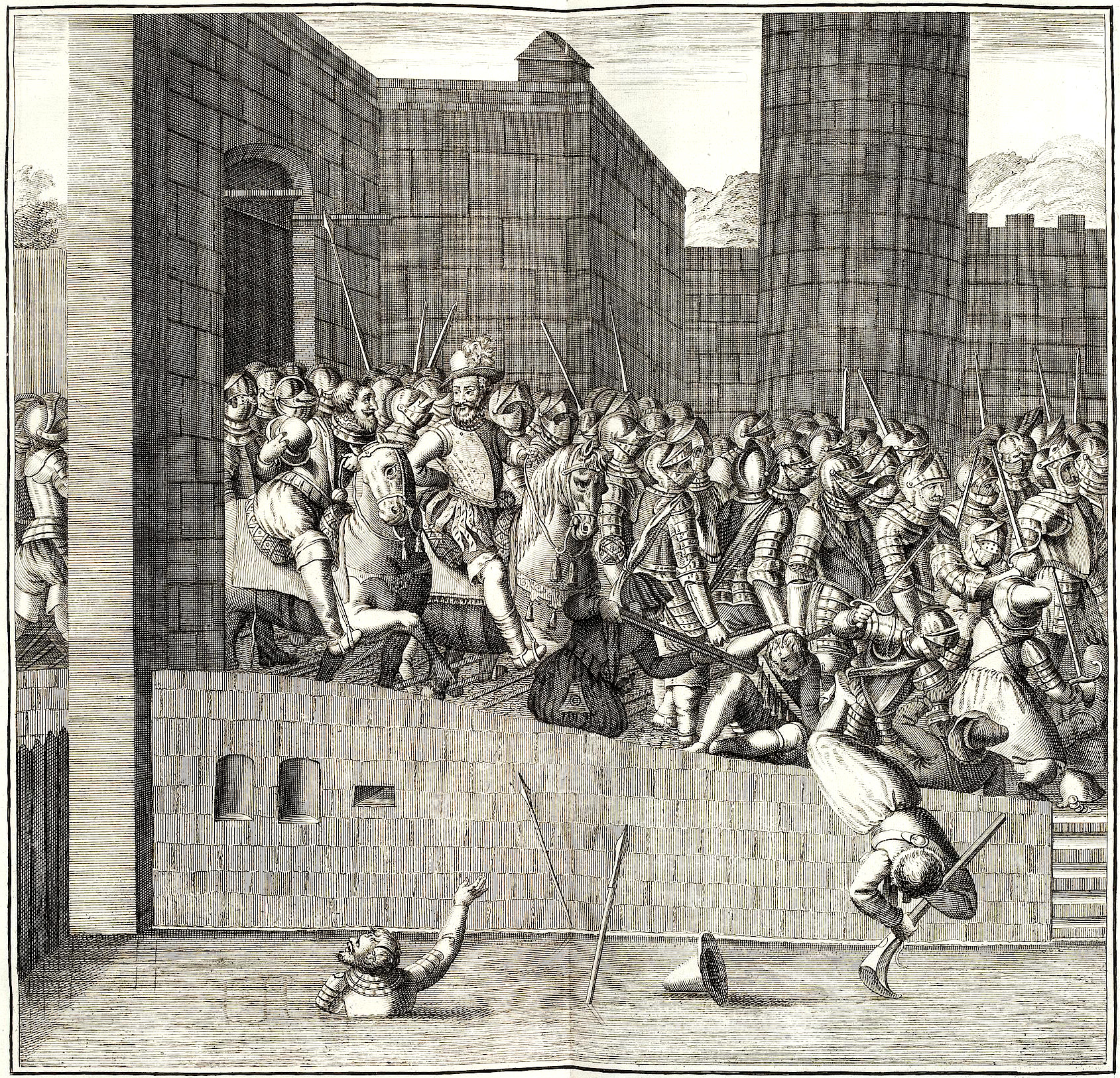
Henry IV enters Paris on 22 March 1594

== Paris and the Parisians ==
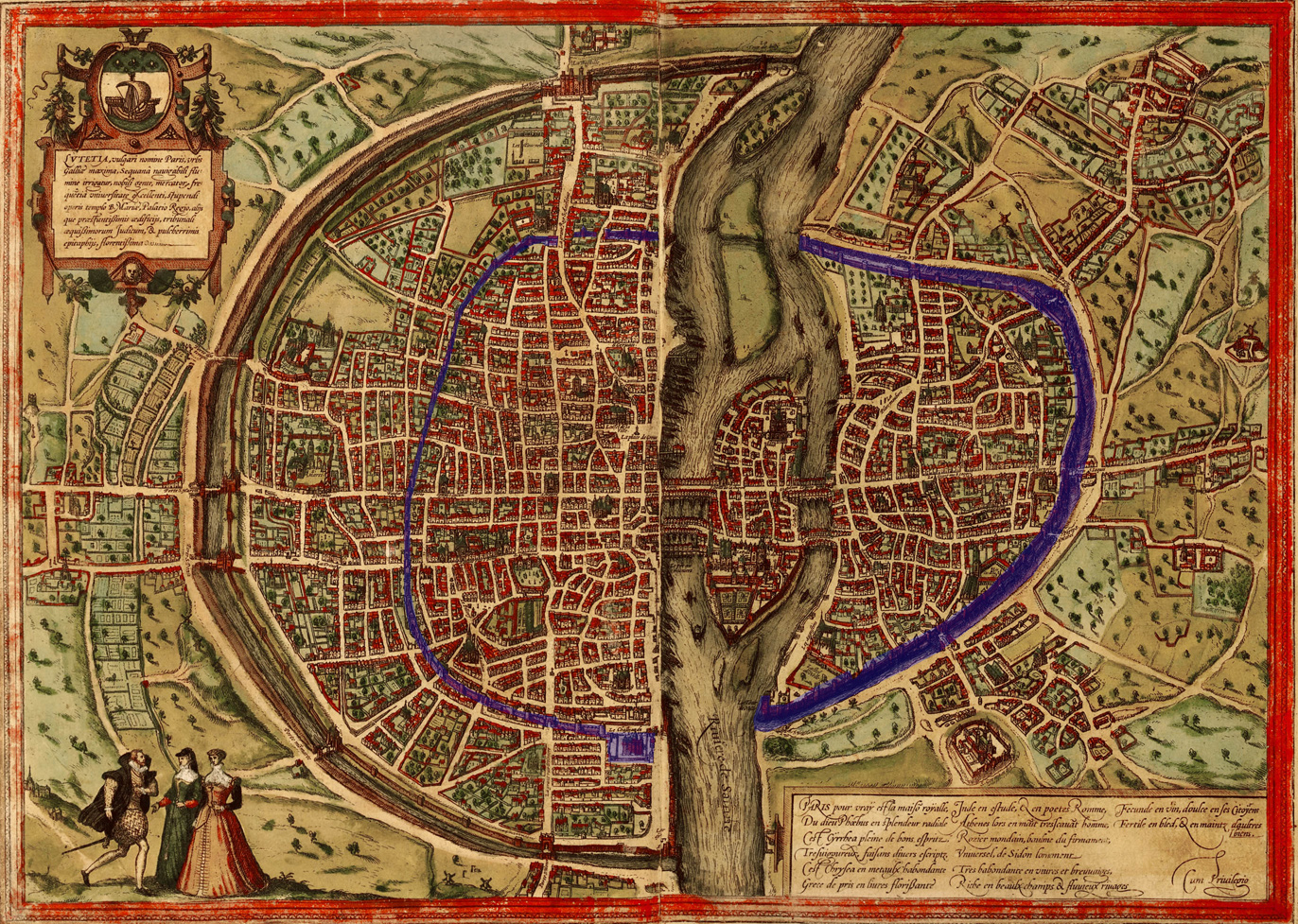
The Munser map of Paris from 1572

The population of Paris is estimated by modern historians to have been about 250,000 at the beginning of the 16th century, growing to 350,000 by 1550, then dropping down to 300,000 by the end of the century, due to the plague epidemic of 1580, and the long siege of the city during the Wars of Religion. The area of the city covered about 439 hectares within the city walls. Several new neighborhoods, formerly rural, were populated over the course of the century, notably the Faubourgs Saint-Honoré, Saint-Martin, and Montmartre. Despite efforts of the government to keep the area outside of the walls clear of buildings, the city expanded outward past the walls.

The social geography of the city was much as it was in the Middle Ages. The commercial center was the port on the right bank, at the Place de Greve, where the City Hall is today. The main market was close by, at Les Halles. The university and several large monasteries were on the left bank; in the 16th-century booksellers and printers opened near the university. In the first part of the century, when the King was absent, the center of administration was in the old Palais on the Île-de-la-Cité, where the courts, treasury, and other government officials worked. When the King returned to Paris, the Louvre became the main royal residence. The poor were concentrated in the narrow, winding streets on the Île-de-la-Cité and near Les Halles. When the King returned to Paris, the nobles of the Court began to build large residences in the Marais district, in the east of the city.

Paris was the largest city in Europe, rivaled only by London, and by far the largest city in France; the second-largest French city, Rouen, had only fifty thousand inhabitants. It was described by visitors at the time as "immense" and "monstrous". The population was largely made up of native Parisians and immigrants from other French regions, but it also included large communities of foreigners; Germans were numerous among the students and printers; the Flemish and Dutch among the artisans and craftsmen. The largest community of foreigners were Italians, who had come following the military campaign in Italy and especially after the marriage of the King with Catherine de Medici. They acted as the designers, artists and craftsmen for the new palaces and building projects, and were also numerous and powerful in the banking community. The wealthy Gondi family, for example, came to Paris at the invitation of Catherine de Medici; through her influence, one Gondi was soon named Marechal of France, and another was made the bishop of Paris.

== Administration ==
During most of the 16th century, the kings of France kept Paris under their close personal control, and greatly reduced the power of the merchants and leaders of the guilds, who had previously played a large part in governing the city. The Provost of the merchants of Paris was elected by the merchants, but he could not take office until he was approved by the King. A decree of 1554 took away the right to vote of the gens mécaniques, or artisans of Paris, and required that, of the twenty-four members of the municipal council, ten and had to be officers of the royal government, and seven of the merchants had to have sufficient wealth that they did not need to do any real business. The remaining seven were allowed to do business, as long as they were not artisans.

The Provost of Paris became a part of the royal entourage, and was selected from the high nobility, not from the merchants. Five members of the noble family of D'Estouteville were provosts between 1446 and 1542. Others included Jacques de Coligny (1509–1512); Gabriel d'Alègre (1513–1526), and Antoine Du Prat III and IV, who governed the city between 1544 and 1588.

As of 1516, the Provost had seven lieutenants; two were responsible for justice and criminal matters; one for civil justice; one for the police and public thoroughfares, at the head of a force of ten archers. In many of his functions, including the police, the Provost was subordinate to a higher official, the Governor of the Île-de-France, who was the chief of the nobility of the Île-de-France and the first magistrate of Paris, in charge of the raising soldiers, fortifications, and armaments. During the 16th century they were frequently outside of the Paris at the front of different wars, and the city was governed by one of their lieutenants. This position was held by nobles of higher rank than the Provosts; it included several members of the royal family, the Bourbons; the Montmorency family; a Coligny; and a La Rouchefoucaud.

=== The police and the courts ===
The official police force of Paris was very small, twenty archers commanded by one of the lieutenants of the Provost. They were supported by a force of two hundred and twenty sergeants à verge who were stationed at the city gates and major intersections. The night watch was maintained by a separate force of about two hundred and forty men, composed of the Chevalier du guet and his sergeants. The earlier night watch, which had consisted of members of the merchants, was abolished in 1559 because of its ineffectiveness. In the first part of the 16th century, the merchants still had considerable control of commercial matters and disputes, but in the second half of the century most of these rights were taken away. In 1563 a system of commercial judges was created, the ancestor of the modern tribunes of commerce, which took away the power of the guilds to settle commercial disputes.

== Religion ==
The Roman Catholic Church in Paris was closely aligned with the Crown; the Bishops of Paris were chosen not because of the religious virtues, but because of their membership in prominent aristocratic families close to the King. Five important new churches were built in the Paris in the 16th century, the largest of which was Saint-Eustache near the central market of Les Halles. Throughout the century, Paris was a fortress of the traditional Roman Catholic faith. However, religious conflicts between Catholics and the new Protestant sects grew over the course of the century, culminating in the St. Bartholomew's Day massacre and the wars of religion.

The College of Sorbonne of the University of Paris, the city's major school of theology, took the lead in condemning heresies and Protestantism. In 1534 a Spanish student at the university, Ignatius of Loyola, gathered together five other students, who were Spanish, French and Portuguese, at the chapel of Saint-Pierre de Montmartre and formed a new society, the Society of Jesus, which became known as the Jesuits. His order became one of the leading forces against the Protestant Reformation.

Orators commissioned by the church fiercely and violently denounced the Protestants, and organized emotional processions of church followers, wearing crosses on their clothing and frequently carrying weapons. The holding of processions to show penitence had been started in Paris by King Henry III in 1583. Between January and May 1589, no less than three hundred processions took place in Paris.

=== Protestants ===
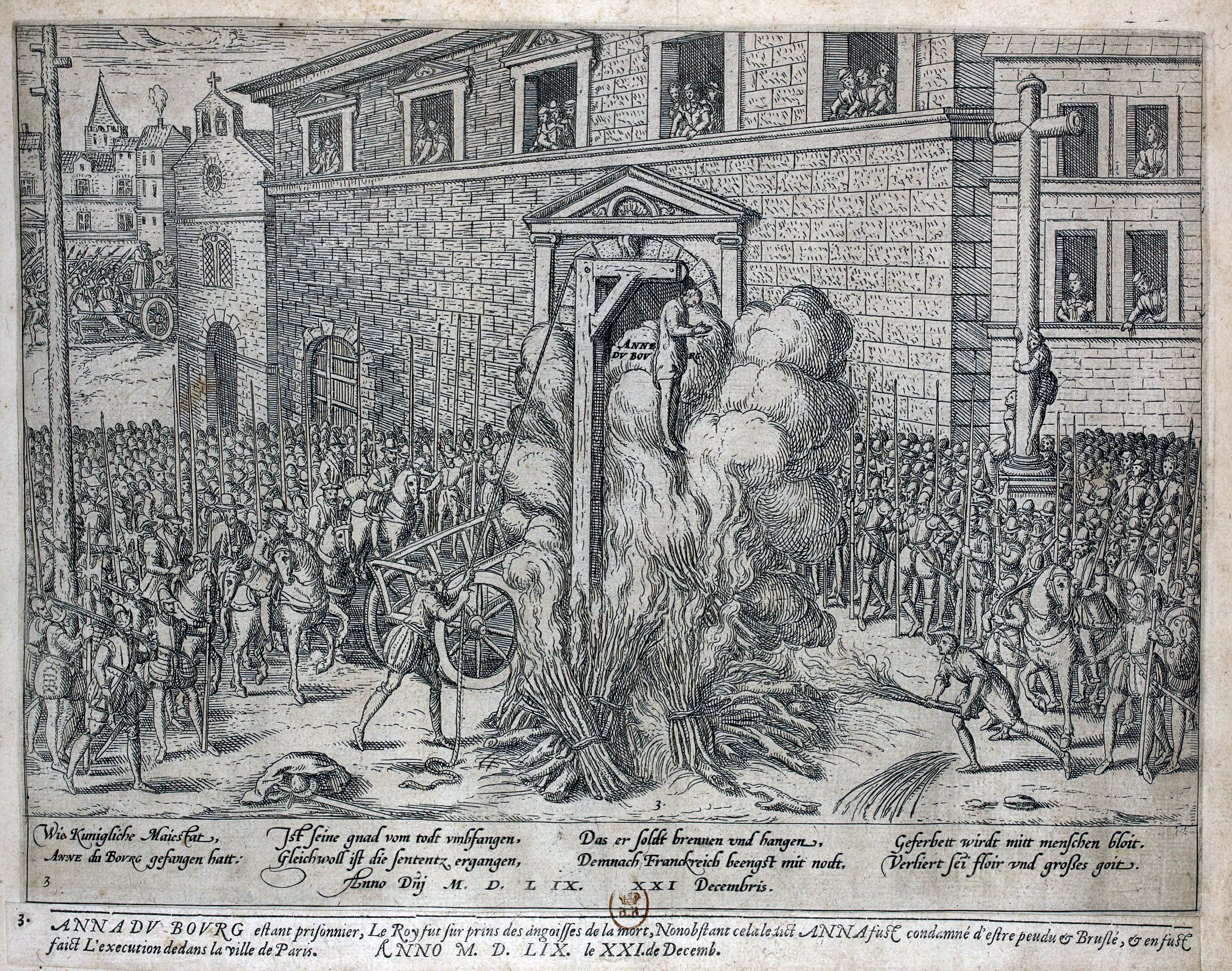
The execution of the Counselor of the Paris Parlement and Protestant Anne du Bourg for heresy (1559)

In 1517, in Wittenberg, the Augustine monk Martin Luther had condemned the sale of indulgences, and in 1520 he formally split from the Roman Catholic Church. The writings of Luther began to circulate in Paris in 1519–20. Luther's doctrines were formally condemned by the University of Paris on 15 April 1521. Nonetheless, the movement became popular among the Swiss and German students at the university. The movement was firmly condemned by the faculty of the College of Sorbonne in 1521, and then the church took harsher measures. In 1523 the Lutheran Jean Vallière was condemned, hanged and then burned at the Pork Market at the porte Saint-Honoré for denying the virgin birth of Christ. Many more executions followed. King Francis I, a follower of humanism, and the Bishop of Paris, Jean Du Bellay, protected some church reformers, such as Louis Berquin, the translator of Erasmus and Luther, but in his absence the Sorbonne had Berquin arrested, strangled, and then burned on the place de Grève on 17 April 1529. Miles Regnault, a secretary of the bishop of Paris, was also burned. The Lutherans of Paris responded by mutilating the statues of saints on the street corners and walls of houses in the city.

Calvinism, a French version of the Lutheran reforms, appeared in Paris in 1533; the new rector of the university, Nicolas Cop, was himself a follower. The College of Sorbonne quickly denounced the new heresy, and the King also was forced to condemn it. More arrests followed, but the number of Calvinists grew, particularly among the students and faculty of the university. The first Calvinist church in Paris was established in September 1555 in an inn on the rue des Marais (now rue Visconti). By 1559, there were seventy-two Calvinist congregations in the city, most in the Latin Quarter, close to the university. Despite growing repression, and the execution, on 23 December 1559 on the Place de Greve of a prominent reformer, Anne Du Bourg, a counselor of the Parlement of Paris, the number of Protestants continued to grow. By 1561, the number of congregations had grown to two thousand, five hundred and fifty. The government refused to allow permanent Protestant churches in the center of the city, so they were opened at the edges of the city, in Popincourt near the church of St. Medard in the southern part of the city.

The new Protestant community included many artists and scholars, including Bernard Palissy, sculptor Jean Goujon, and architects Androuet Du Cerceau and Pierre Lescot. It also included many nobles; of 130 persons arrested at an illegal church service on Rue Saint-Jacques on 5 September 1557, thirty were from noble families. In 1561–62, the number of Protestants in Paris was estimated at between ten and fifteen thousand; in France as a whole, three million, or fifteen percent of the population.

The Massacre of Saint-Bartholomew's Day on 23–24 August 1572 killed between two and three thousand Protestants; it was followed by a large-scale emigration of Protestants out of the city, primarily to Sedan, Montbeliard and Geneva.

In 1598, with the Edict of Nantes, the Protestants were again able to open a church at Grigny, on the banks of the Seine outside the city. It was moved closer, to Charenton, six miles from the Bastille, in 1606.

=== Jews ===
The Jewish community in Paris in the 16th century consisted of only about a dozen families. The Jews had been formally expelled from the city by Philippe le Bel in 1306, and in 1380 and 1382, the houses of Jews and property of Parisian Jews had been seized. The few families remaining were of Italian or central European origin, and kept a very, very low profile. The first migration of about fifty Sephardic Jews from Spain and Portugal did not arrive until 1667, via Bayonne, Bordeaux and the Netherlands.

== Education ==
=== The University and the College Royal ===
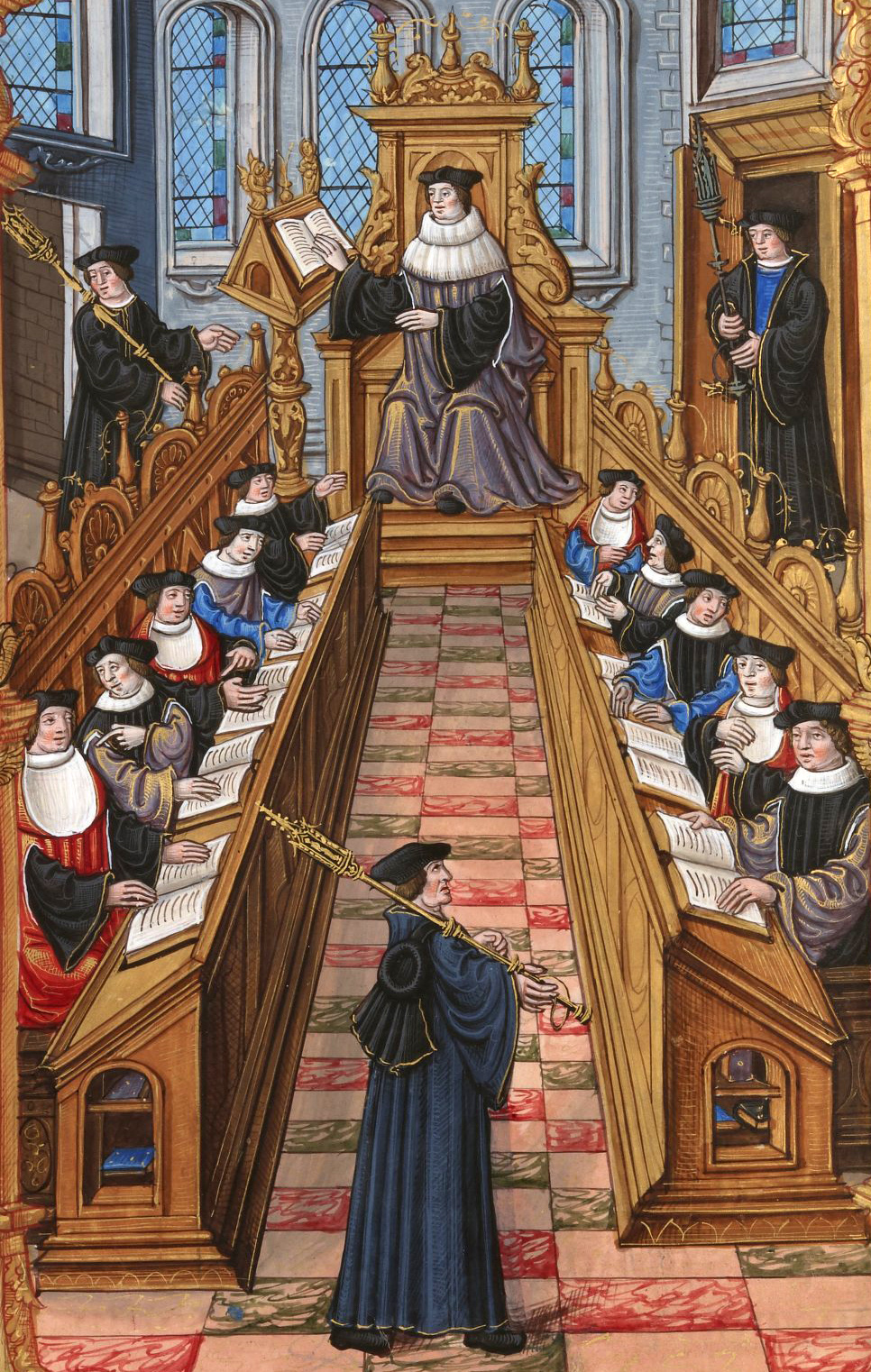
A faculty meeting at the University of Paris in the 16th century

The University of Paris was a medieval institution, a collection of sixty different colleges, ill-prepared for the new ideas and debates of the Renaissance. The law faculty taught only religious law, not civil law, except during one brief period between 1564 and 1573, when the religious conflicts prevented students from going to the civil law faculty in Orleans. The College of Sorbonne, the theology faculty of the university, condemned any kind of religious reform, and ostracized humanist scholars on its own faculty, including Erasmus, who departed for England. The life of the students within the colleges was extremely difficult; there was little food, the water from the wells was unhealthy, and the students lived in damp chambers that were freezing in the winter. Students were routinely whipped for small offenses. one Dutch student, Arnold Van Buchel, wrote of the college of Montaigu in 1585-86: "One would believe that this is a prison made for punishment rather than establishment of instruction."

King Francis I recognized the weaknesses of the university, and, at the urging the scholar Guillaume Budé, in 1530 he created the College Royal, later known as the College de France. It had a faculty six well-known scholars chosen from the university faculty, three teaching Hebrew, two teaching ancient Greek, and one teaching mathematics. The new college was immediately condemned by the Sorbonne, which criticized the level of theological knowledge of the faculty of the new school. In response, the King made the new college entirely separate and independent from the university.

=== Elementary and secondary education ===
The Renaissance and the growing availability of books encouraged a great desire for primary education. The children of noble families had private tutors. The first schools for less favored families were organized by the church, and were for boys only; they taught reading, writing, and counting. With the emergence of religious reform, many Protestants formed their own schools, outside the control of Catholic Church; classes sometimes included girls as well as boys. To prevent this, in 1554 the Parlement of Paris passed a decree forbidding schools independent of the Catholic church, and forbidding girls and boys from studying together. Despite this act, the number of clandestine schools continued to grow.

Through the Middle Ages, there was no secondary education in Paris; students went from elementary schools to the university. However, in the 15th century, a system of education for adolescents appeared in the Netherlands, and was imported to France in the 16th century. It had eight levels, leading to the university, was run by religious orders, and focused on discipline and an ascetic life as much as education. It was adopted by several of the colleges of the university, including the College of Montaigu and the college de Bourgogne. where students were taught to repeat, to argue effectively, to live a frugal life and to regulate their hours. A similar system was created by the Society of Jesus, or Jesuits, founded in Paris by Ignace de Loyola. The Jesuits founded the College de Clermont (now the Lycée Louis-le-Grand) in 1556, which was the single important College in Paris until the Revolution. Students could enter the course of Latin at any age between four and eighteen, though the average age at entrance was eight years old. The education continued for six years, after which students went to the university. A religious order for women, the Ursulines, provided secondary education for young women, but the teaching was limited to reading, writing, sewing and embroidery.

== Hospitals and cemeteries ==
The first and primary hospital of Paris was the Hôtel-Dieu, close to the Cathedral of Notre-Dame on the Île-de-la-Cité, founded in the early Middle Ages. It was run by the Church and had been enlarged over the centuries, but it was not large enough for the thousands of patients who came there; each bed held several patients. It could provide very little in the way of actual medical care, but it did offer food and regular religious services for the sick. Several other more specialized hospitals were established in the 16th century, including hospitals for orphans, patients with syphilis, and hospitals for wounded soldiers.

Each church, convent and abbey had its own small cemetery, many as small as ten square meters. The largest cemetery in the city was that of the Saints-Innocents, near Les Halles, which covered 7000 square meters. Two thousand persons had been buried at the Saints-Innocents, causing serious poisoning of the soil to a depth of two meters or more, and a ghastly aroma in the neighborhood. The residents began demanding its closure as early as 1554, but the Parlement of Paris did not close the city cemeteries to new burials until 1765.

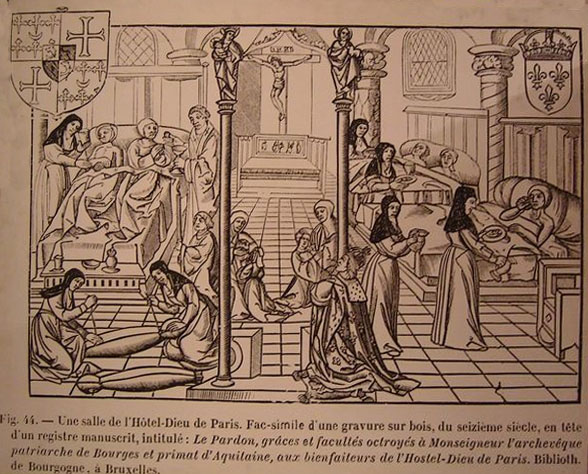
The Hôtel-Dieu hospital in about 1500. Each bed usually held several patients.

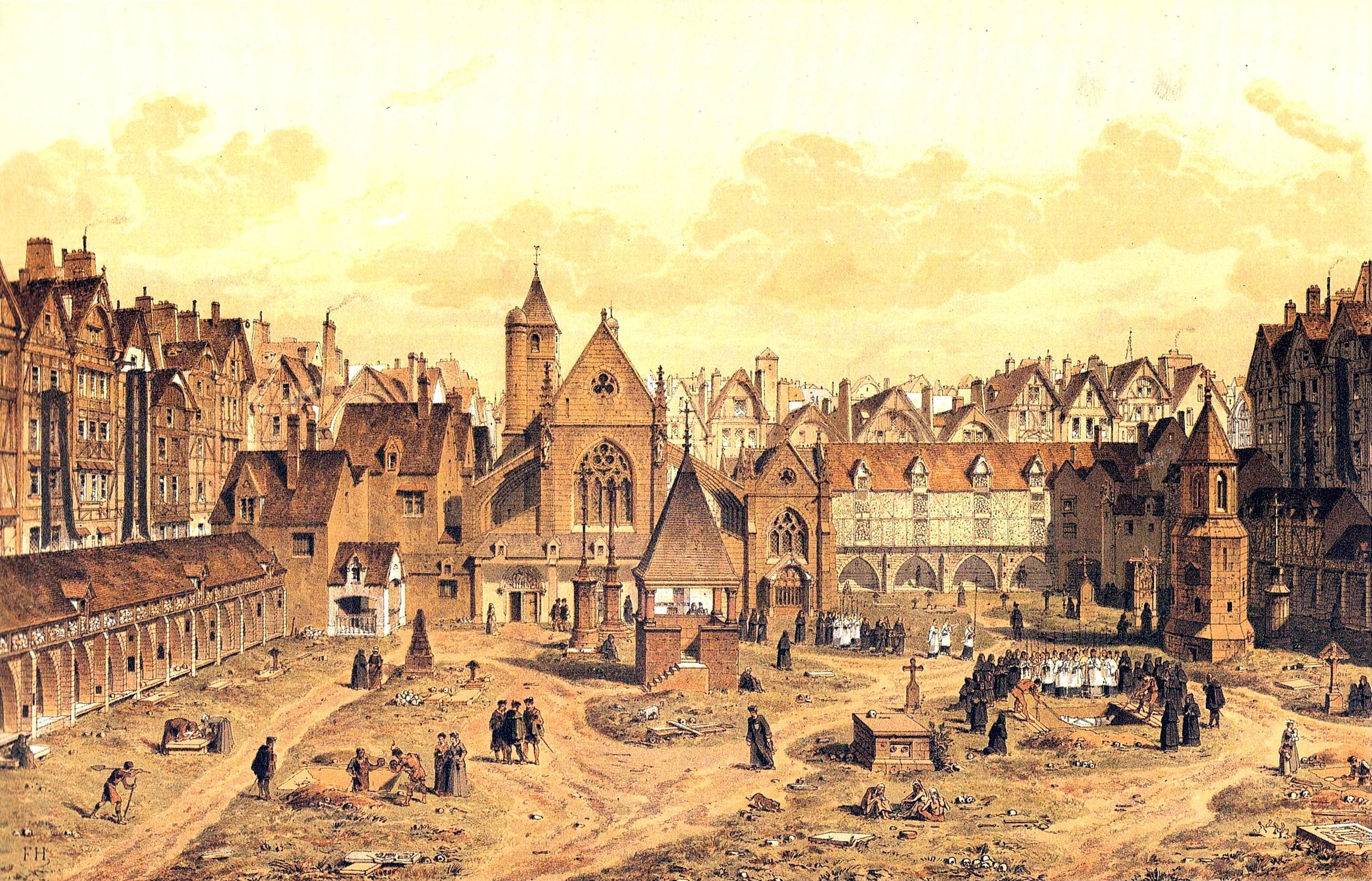
The Cemetery of the Saints-Innocents, the largest in the city, in 1550. (19th-century engraving by Hoffbauer)

== Daily life ==
=== Taverns and cabarets ===
The restaurant in its modern form did not appear in Paris until the late 18th century, but Paris had numerous taverns which served drinks and food separately, and cabarets, which had tablecloths and served pots of wine with the meal. The practice of cabarets offering entertainment and music did not come until the 19th century. A brochure of 1574 invited customers to visit Chez Le More, chez Sanson, chez Innocent and chez Havard, "Ministries of voluptuousness and free-spending." The most famous cabaret of the time was the Pomme de pin, on place de la Contrescarpe in the 5th arrondissement. It was regularly visited by poet Pierre de Ronsard and author François Rabelais, who described it as a meeting place of voyagers, students and bandits. It was equally popular with prostitutes. It was located across the street from the modern cabaret which has the same name.

== Economy ==
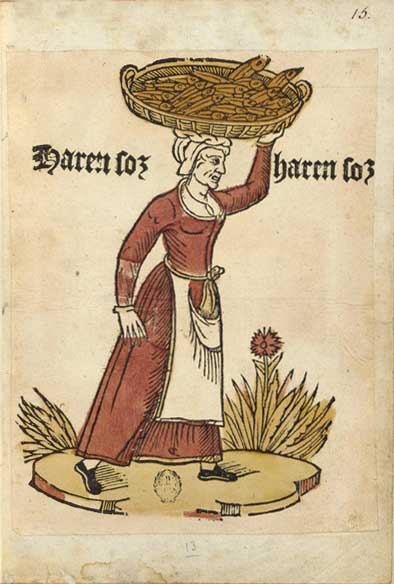
A herring vendor on the street (about 1500)

=== Artisans ===
The textile industry, dominant in the Paris economy until the 15th century, was greatly reduced by foreign competition in the 15th century. New industries took its place, particularly the dyeing of fabrics. The dyeing workshops in the faubourg Saint-Marcel, along the Bievre River, produced six hundred thousand pieces of dyed cloth a year, and made the fortunes of some Paris families, including Gobelin, Canaye and Peultre. However, production fell to one hundred thousand by the end of the sixteenth century, due to the Wars of Religion and competition from other cities. The manufacture of certain luxury products, such as belts, gloves, and perfumes, and women's bonnets were another important part of the economy, which flourished after the royal court returned to Paris from the Loire Valley. Leather workers, mostly from Spain, Italy, and Hungary, installed their workshops in the Saint-Marcel quarter, while German woodcarvers began to make furniture in the Faubourg Saint-Antoine. Very few workshops had large numbers of employees; most goods were made in small workshops by master artisans and their apprentices, where the family lived in the same building behind the workshop. A new industry had appeared at the end of the 15th century; the printing of books. Books were luxury goods and were most printed in the neighborhood close to the university.

=== Commerce ===
The merciers, who sold fabrics, buttons, ribbons and other items used in making clothing, as well as pots, dishes, and other household products, were the most important commercial guild. The composition of the commercial tribunals between 1564 and 1589 showed the relative importance of Paris merchant guilds; there were fifty merciers, compared with twenty-five cloth merchants, twenty-three fish and wine merchants, twenty-two grocers and spice-sellers, three fur sellers, three jewelers, three cloth dyers and one wood merchant. However, very few Paris merchants had the ambition to create commercial empires; they used their fortunes instead to buy government positions or make marriages which allowed them to advance into the lower ranks of the nobility.

=== Banking and finance ===
Paris was well behind London, Amsterdam, and the German cities in establishing banks, a stock exchange, and other important financial institutions. Wealthy Parisians preferred to invest their money buying land or royal positions, rather than in businesses. They were also very reluctant to loan money to the French kings, who notoriously never paid their debts. Beginning in 1522, wealthy Parisians loaned their money to the Bureau de Ville, the city government, which in turn made loans to the king. In exchange, the king gave the city the right to collect certain taxes in Paris, and the Parisian investors received a healthy eight percent return for their loans to the city. By the second part of the 16th century, however, the kings were so deeply in debt that wealthy Parisians refused to lend any more money; the king was forced to borrow money from Italian bankers, who received the right to receive a portion of French taxes. This system contributed to the unpopularity of the French monarchs, and to the flight of King Henry III from the city in 1588.

=== The ports ===
The Paris economy in the 16th century had two commercial centers; the ports on the Seine, where most of food, wine, lumber, building stone, firewood, and other products arrived; and Les Halles, the central market for food, located not far from the port. Because of the poor quality of the roads outside the city, and the difficulty of moving wagons through the narrow streets within the city, Most products arrived by water. The major port was La Grève, in front of the modern City Hall, developed in the 11th century. The headquarters of the guild of merchants was located next to the port, and became the city hall. Another important early port was located on the north side of the Île-de-la-Cité, where the flower market is located today.

=== Les Halles ===
Les Halles, the central market of Paris, had been founded in 1137 by King Louis VI. By the 16th century, it was overcrowded and inefficient. Between 1543 and 1572, King Francis I and his successors gradually rebuilt the market into the form it kept until the time of Louis Napoleon and the Second Empire. It was located roughly between the Church of Saint-Eustance and the Cemetery of the Innocents, and was surrounded by a long covered wooden gallery composed of series of buildings, known as the pillars des Halles, where stalls were located. within the galleries were seven large covered halls where products were bought and sold; there were halls for cloth, for leather, wines, vegetables and other products; the largest, the grande halle, sold wheat and other grains, fresh and salted pork, butter, and a variety of other products, including ropes for wells and cooking pots. The hall between rue aux Fers and rue de la Cossonnerie sold fruits, vegetables, herbs and flowers.

Les Halles was the only food market for the city until 1558, when a second market, the Marché Neuf, was authorized along the Seine on the southern side of the Île-de-la-Cité, on what is now rue de l'Orberie. It opened in 1568, and included stalls selling fish, meat and vegetables.

== Urbanism ==
Efforts were made by royal government in the 16th century to make Paris more liveable and more functional, though a sense of urbanism, and of the city as a work of design and art, did not come until the very end of the century with the reign of Henry IV.

=== Bridges ===
Through the 16th century, there were only four bridges across the Seine, two on each bank, insufficient for the growing city and the amount of traffic they carried. The Paris bridges at the beginning of the 16th century were largely made of wood, and were frequently washed away in floods or knocked down by ice on the frozen river. The most important bridge was the Pont au Change, which had been built in 1304 under Philip le Bel, and was site where the money-changers had their stalls. A new bridge, the Pont aux Meuniers, was constructed early in the 16th century. It contained thirteen mills for grinding grain, powered by the water of the Seine flowing beneath, and also had a footbridge. It was owned by the religious chapter of Notre Dame, and was poorly maintained. It collapsed during a flood on 23 December 1596, and a number of Parisians were drowned.

The Pont Notre-Dame, connecting the Île de la Cité with the Rue Saint-Martin on the right bank, was on the site of an ancient Gallo-Roman bridge. The bridge was rebuilt in wood in 1413, but was washed away in 1499. The new Pont Notre-Dame was built of stone between 1500 and 1514 in the new Renaissance style, under the direction of a monk from Italy, Brother Joconde, and the designer-constructor Jean de Dayac. It was lined by sixty-eight identical houses made of bricks and stone. Each house was numbered, a novelty which later was used on the streets of Paris.

The Pont Saint-Michel was completed in 1378, and was later called the Pont Neuf, then the Petit Pont Neuf. It was also covered with houses, and was washed away several times. The houses in the 17th century were largely occupied by perfume-makers and book-sellers.

In 1578, King Henry III laid the first stone for a new bridge, the Point Neuf, the oldest Paris bridge in existence today. To make more room for traffic, it was built without houses. Because of the Wars of Religion, it was not completed until 1604.

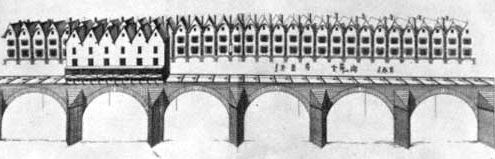
The Pont Notre-Dame (1512), the first Renaissance bridge in Paris, with sixty-eight houses.

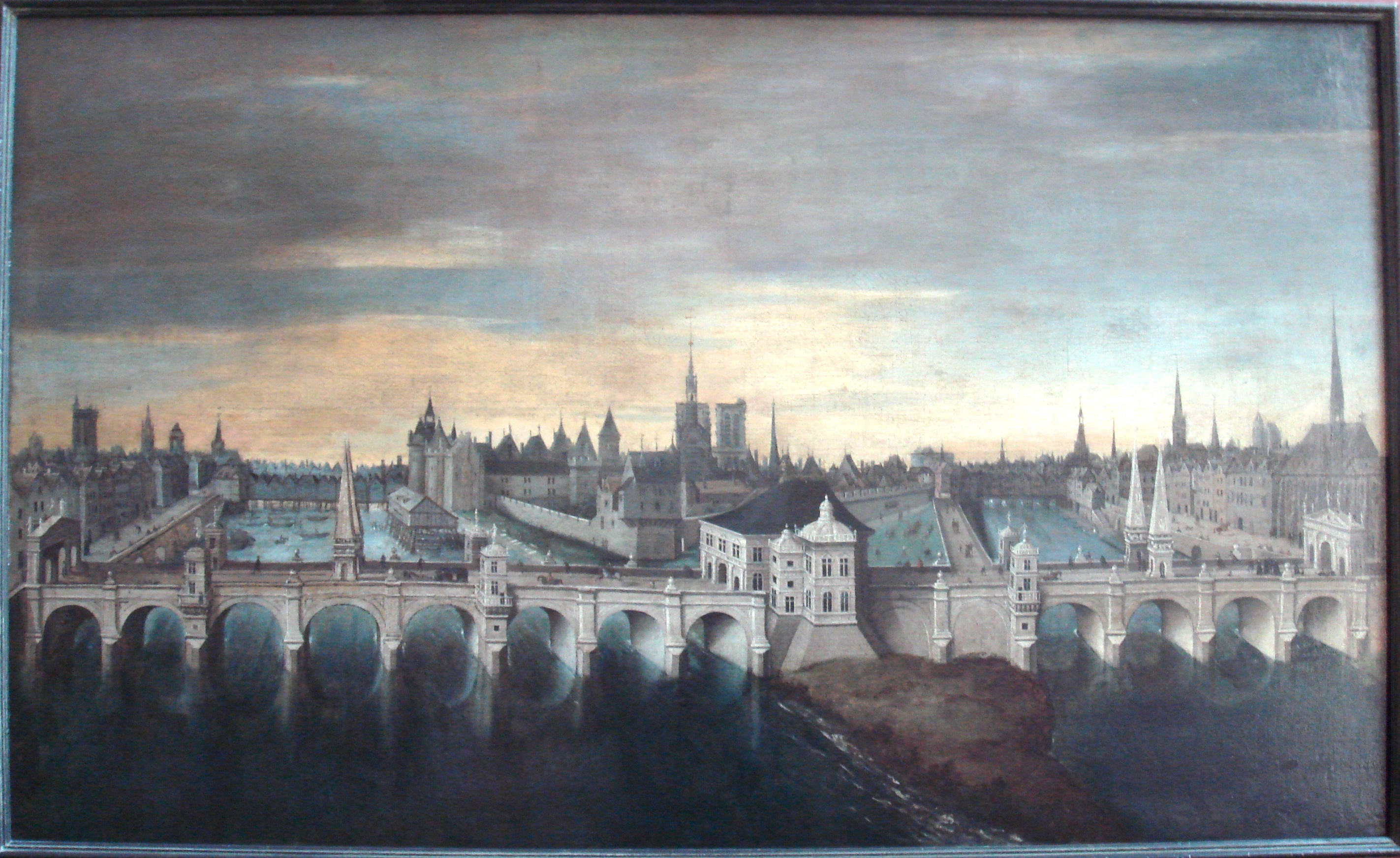
The 1577 project for the Pont Neuf, approved by Henry III

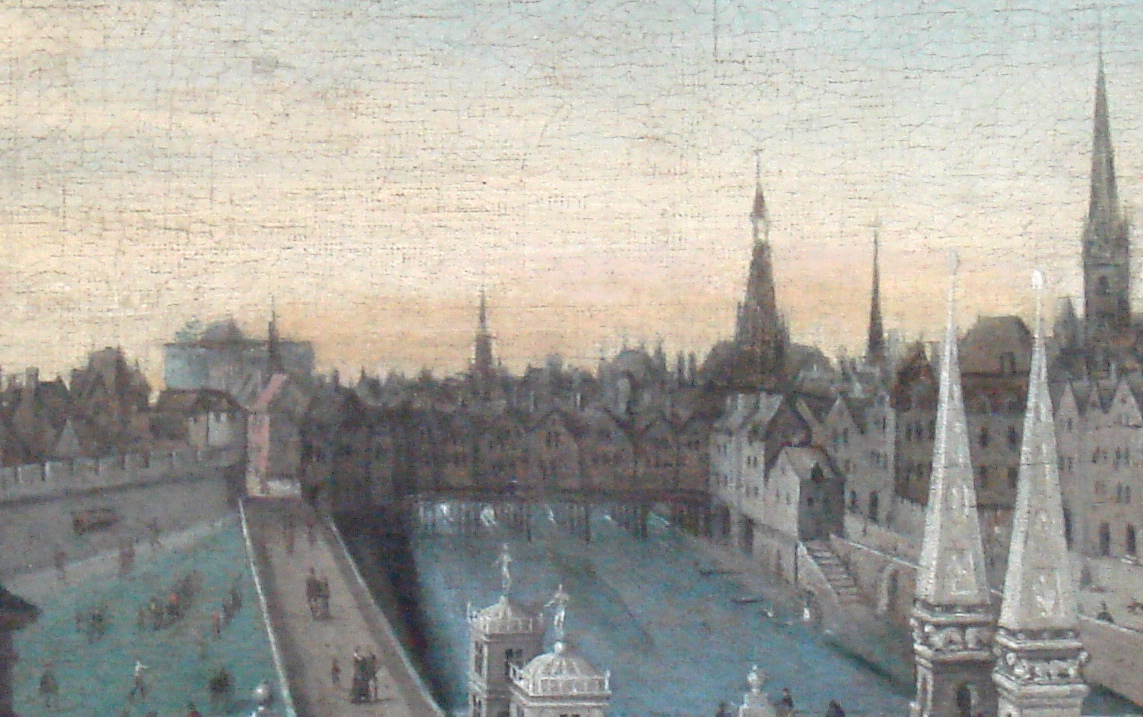
The Pont Saint-Michel in 1577

=== Street lights ===
The narrow streets of Paris were dark and dangerous at night; those who ventured out had to carry their own torches, or hire a torch-bearer to light their way. In 1524, the city administration decreed that lanterns with lit candles should be hung in front of houses at night. The decree was renewed on 16 November 1526, but it seems not to have been widely followed. In October 1588, the Parlement of Paris decreed that there must be a lit torch at every corner in the city, from ten in the evening until four in the morning. However, the Parlement did not provide any funding, and there is no evidence that the decree was followed. Finally, at the end of the century, some progress was made. in 1594, a new decree from the police called for lanterns to be hung in the streets of each quarter, with city officials designated to see that they were regularly lit. The new lanterns, with glass windows, provided much better light than the old candles and torches, and it became somewhat easier and safer for Parisians to pass through the streets at night.

== Culture and the arts ==
=== Theater and ballet ===
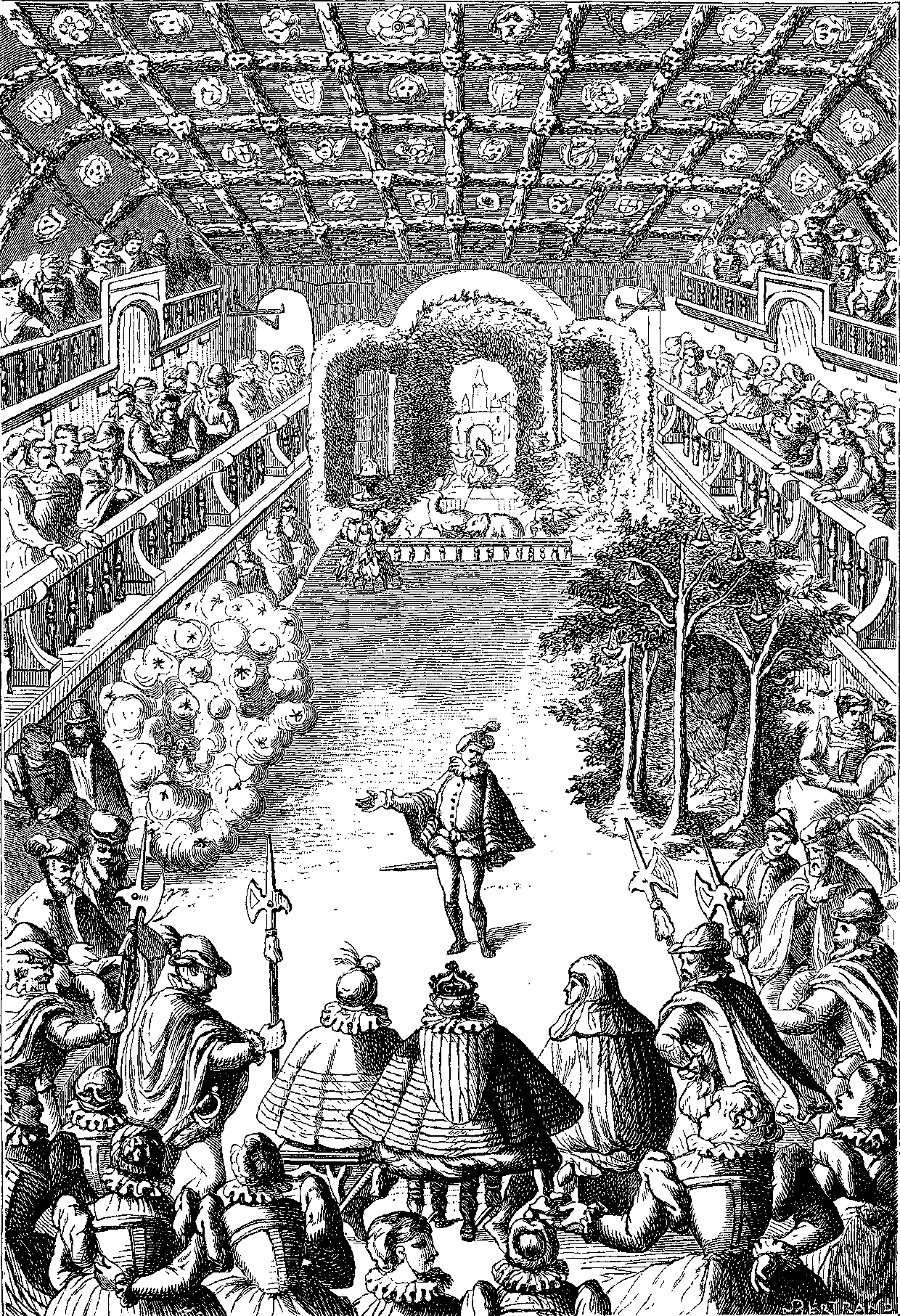
Ballet performance at the Louvre (1582)

At the beginning of the 16th century, an amateur theater group called the Confrérie de la Passion was periodically performing Passion plays, based on the Passion of Christ, in a large hall on the ground floor of the Hospital of the Trinity on Rue Saint-Denis. where they remained until 1539. In 1543 they bought one of the buildings attached to the hôtel de Bourgogne at 23 rue Étienne-Marcel, which became the first permanent theater in the city. The church authorities in Paris denounced Passion and religious mystery plays, and they were banned in 1548. The Confrérie rented out its theater to visiting theater troupes, notably an English company directed by Jean Sehais, an Italian company called the Gelosi Italiens, and a French company headed by Valleran Le Conte.

Plays were also performed at the royal court. The first classical French tragedy, Cléopâtre captive by Étienne Jodelle, was performed before Henry II in February 1553. Ballets also became popular at the French court, and were performed to celebrate weddings and other special occasions. The first performance of Circé by Balthazar de Beaujoyeux was performed at the Louvre on 24 September 1581, to celebrate the wedding of Anne de Joyeuse, a favorite of the King, with Marguerite de Vaudémont.

=== Painting and sculpture ===
The Renaissance in painting was brought to Paris with the court of Francis I, with the arrival of his Italian court painters Rosso Fiorentino, Francesco Primaticcio (known in French as Primatice); and Nicolo dell'Abbate. who worked both in Paris and in the decoration of the Palace of Fontainebleau. The leading French artists in Paris were François Clouet, Jean Cousin the Elder, whose success allowed him to build a grand house and studio on the modern rue Visconti in the Marais; and Antoine Caron, official painter for the last Valois kings. The Italian goldsmith, sculptor and architect Benvenuto Cellini, also came to Paris for five years, creating works for the king and the court.

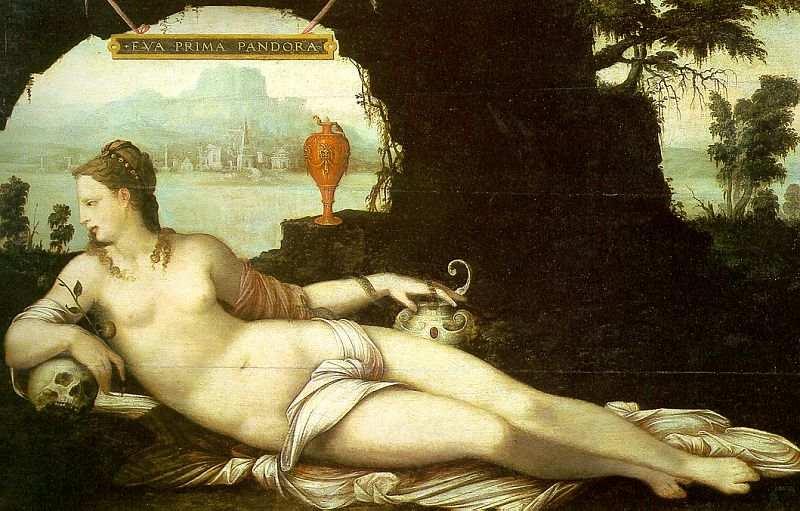
Eva Prima Pandora by Jean Cousin the Elder (1570)

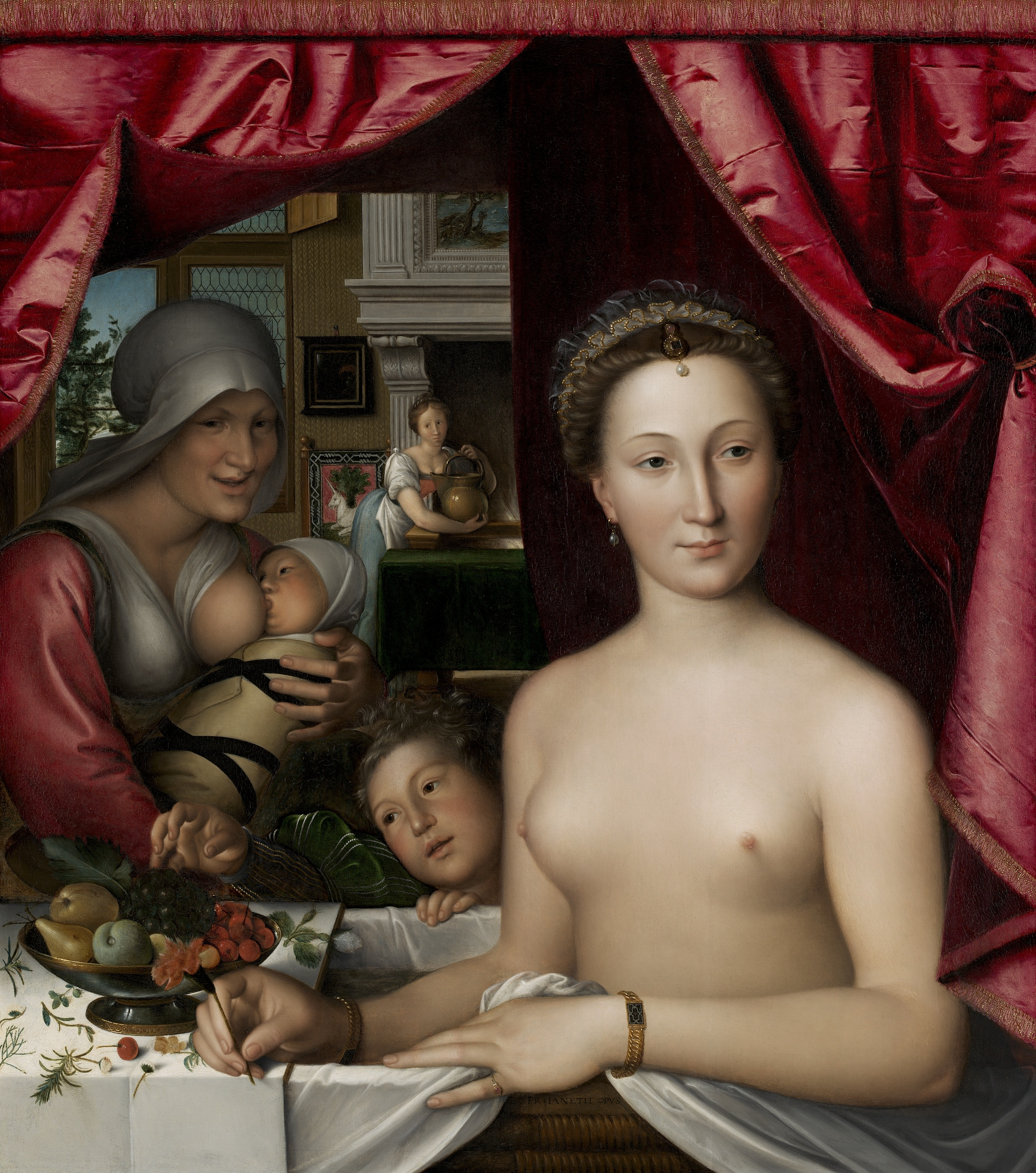
Diane de Poitiers by François Clouet (1571)

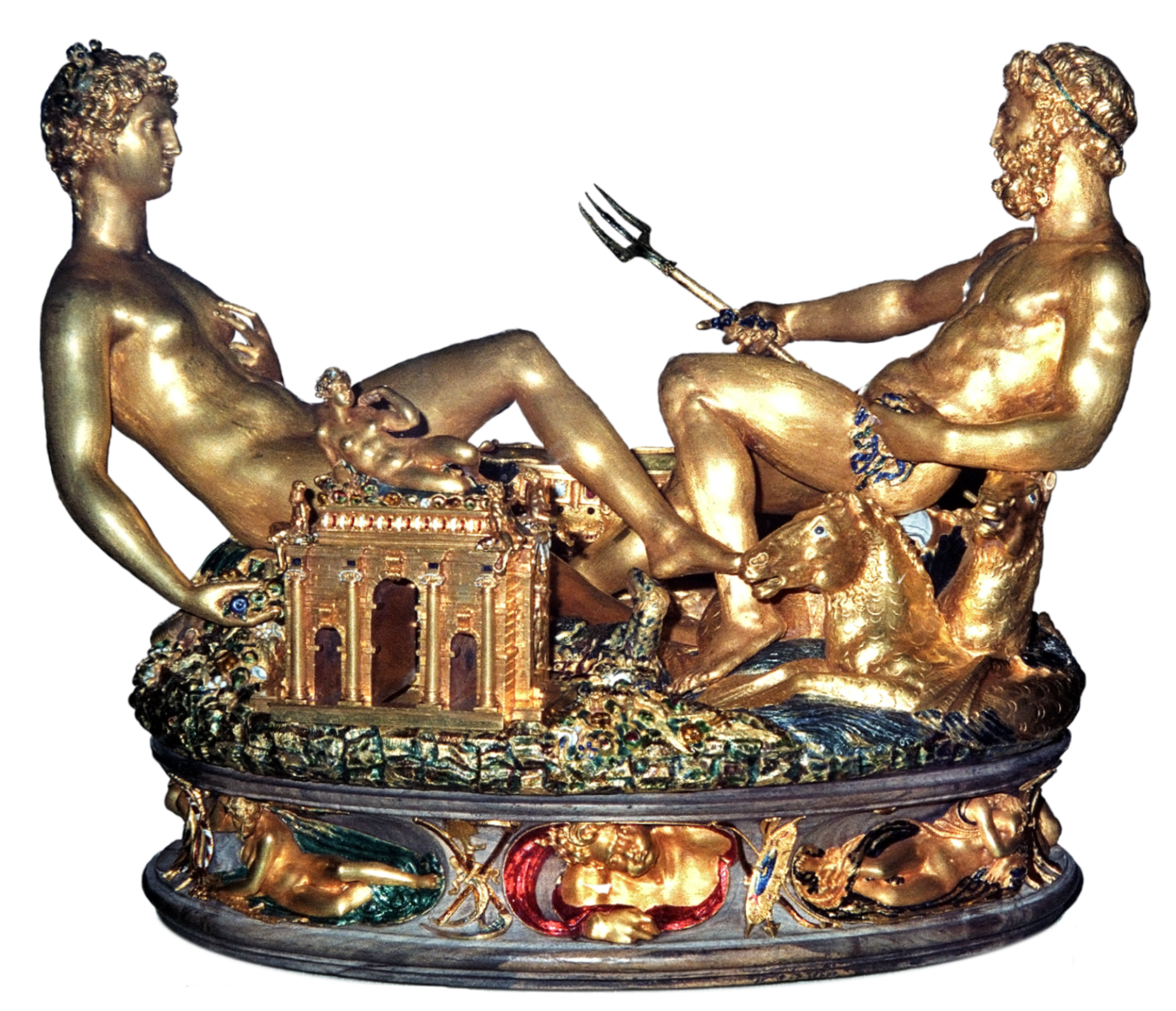
Saliera by Benvenuto Cellini (1540–43)

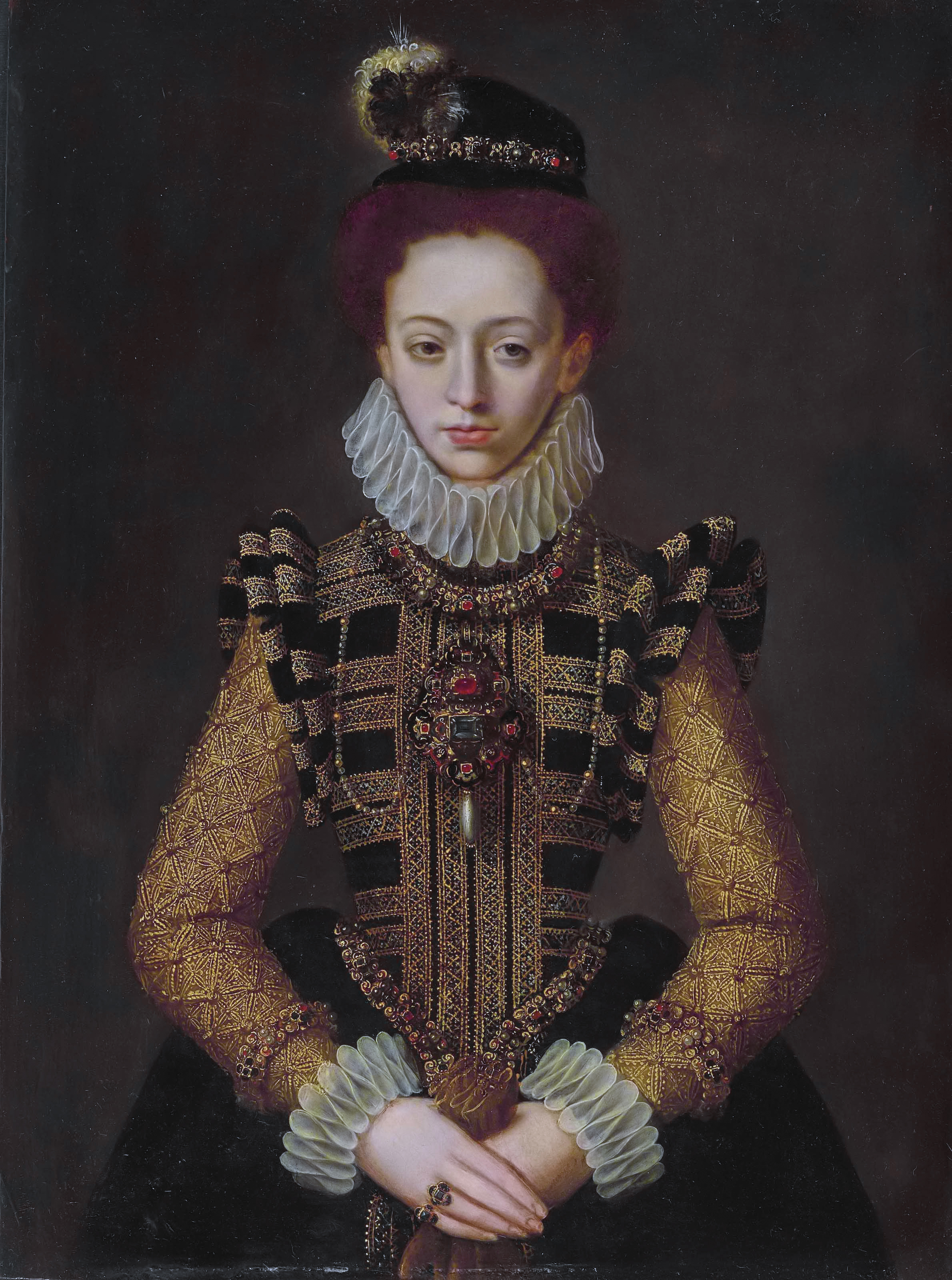
Sibylle de Clèves-Juliers-Berg, margravine de Burgau (1557–1628), by Monogrammist AC

The most important French sculptors working in Paris were Jean Goujon (1510–1565), whose works include the decoration of the Fontaine des Innocents, the facade of the Lescot wing of the Louvre, the Caryatids on the music platform of the ceremonial hall of the Louvre (1550–51); and the Four Seasons decorating the facade of the Musée Carnavalet (1547); Pierre Bontemps (1505–1568), who created sculptures for the tomb of Francis I and a funeral monument for Charles de Marigny (1556), now in the Louvre; and Germain Pilon (1525–1590), who made the extremely realistic funerary figures of Henry II of France and Catherine de'Medici for their tombs in the Basilica of Saint Denis, as well as the 385 grotesque masquerons which decorate the Pont Neuf.

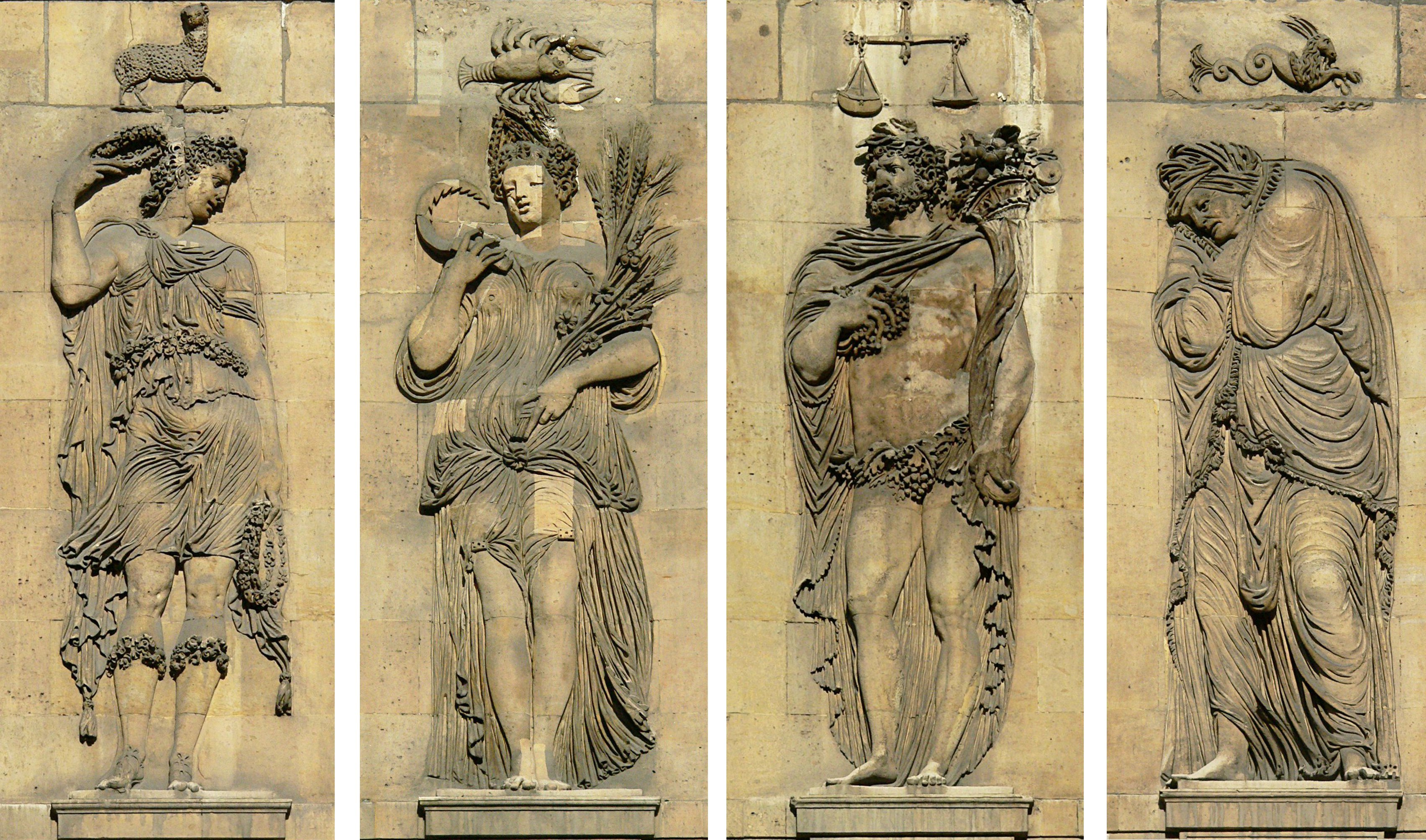
The Four Seasons by Jean Goujon, decorating the facade of the Musée Carnavalet (1547)

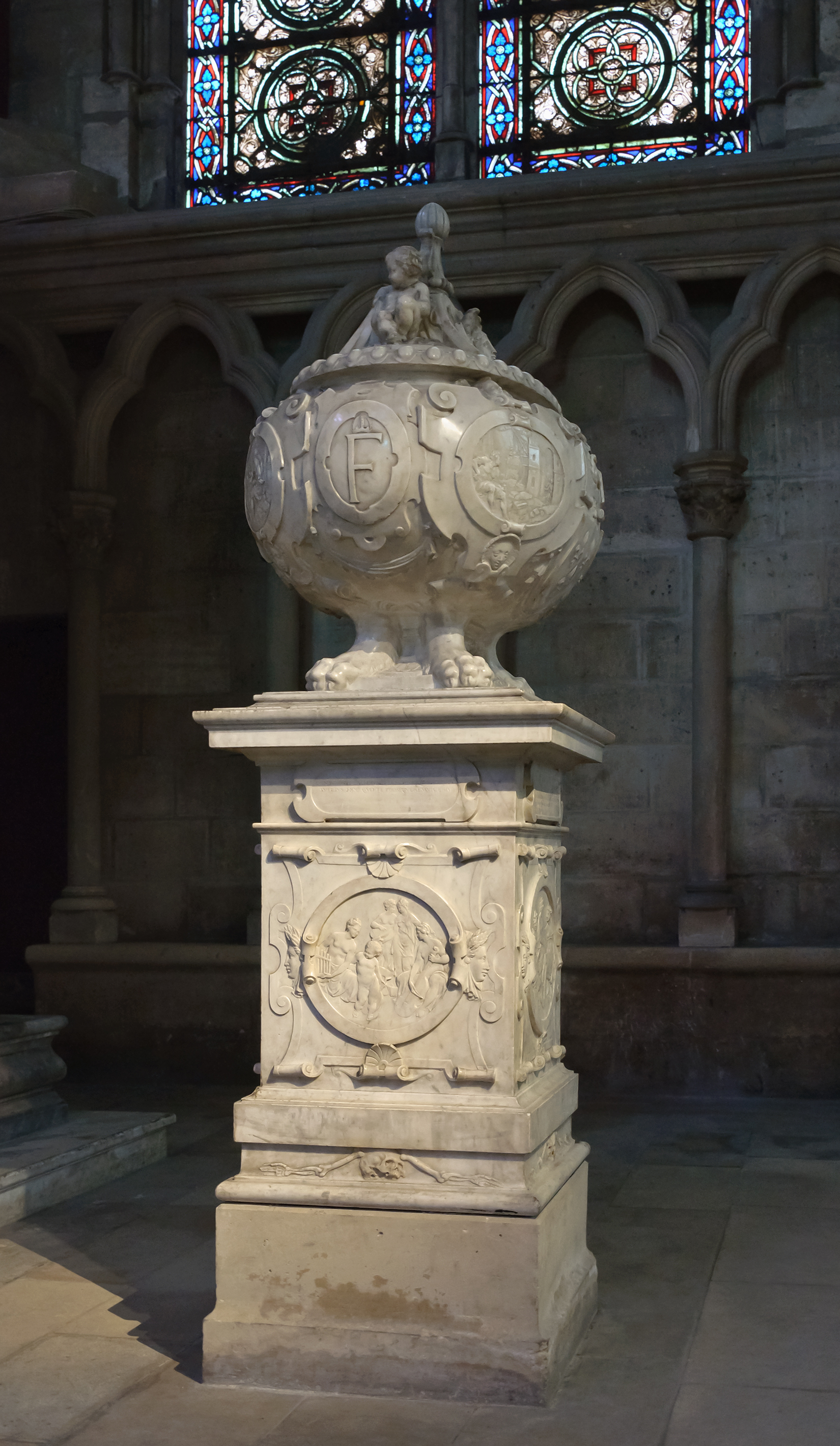
Monument for the heart of Francis I of France, by Pierre Bontemps, in the Basilica of Saint-Denis (1547)

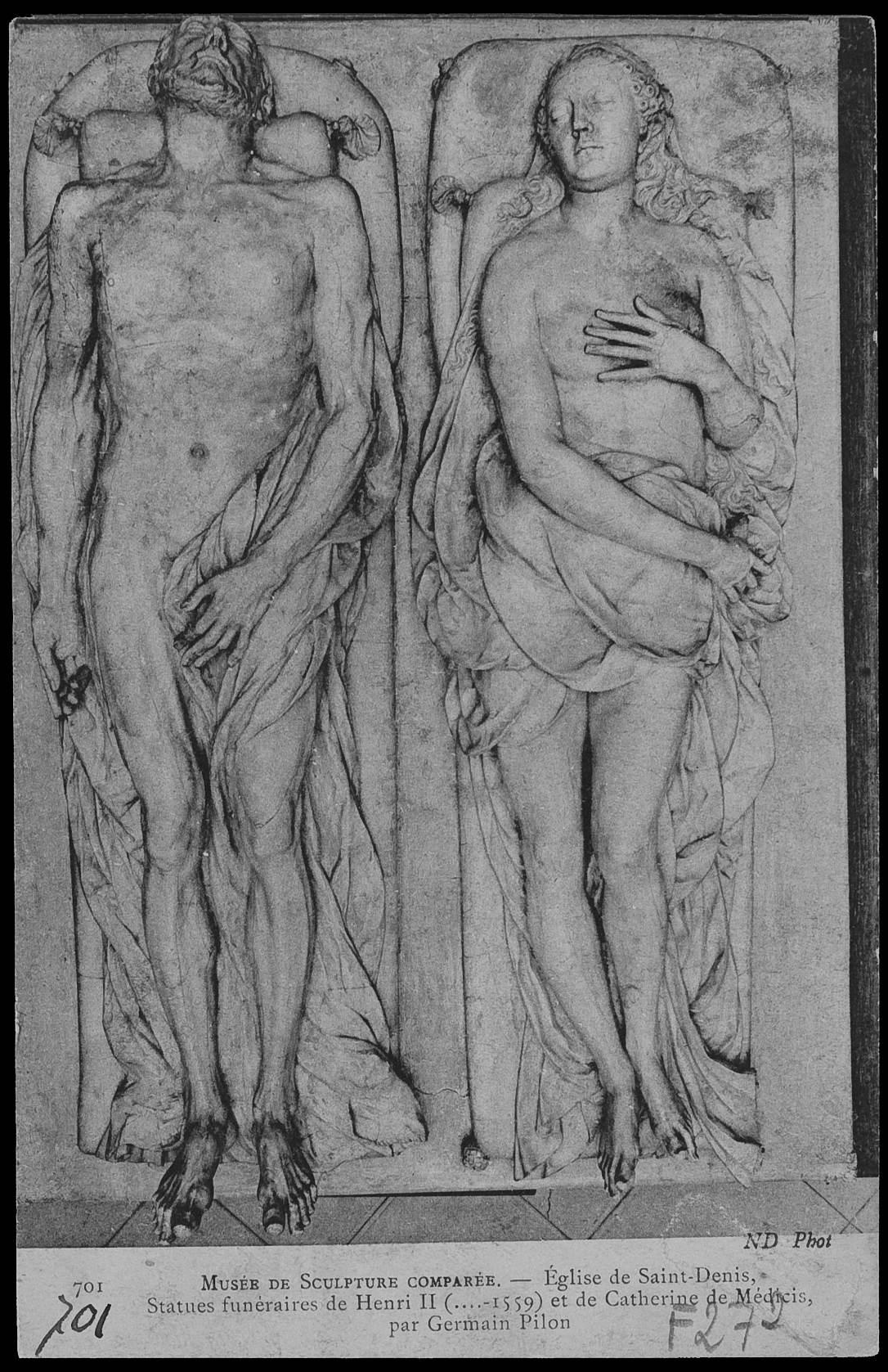
Funeral statuary of Henry II and Catherine de'Medici in the Basilica of Saint-Denis by Germain Pilon (1561–1573)

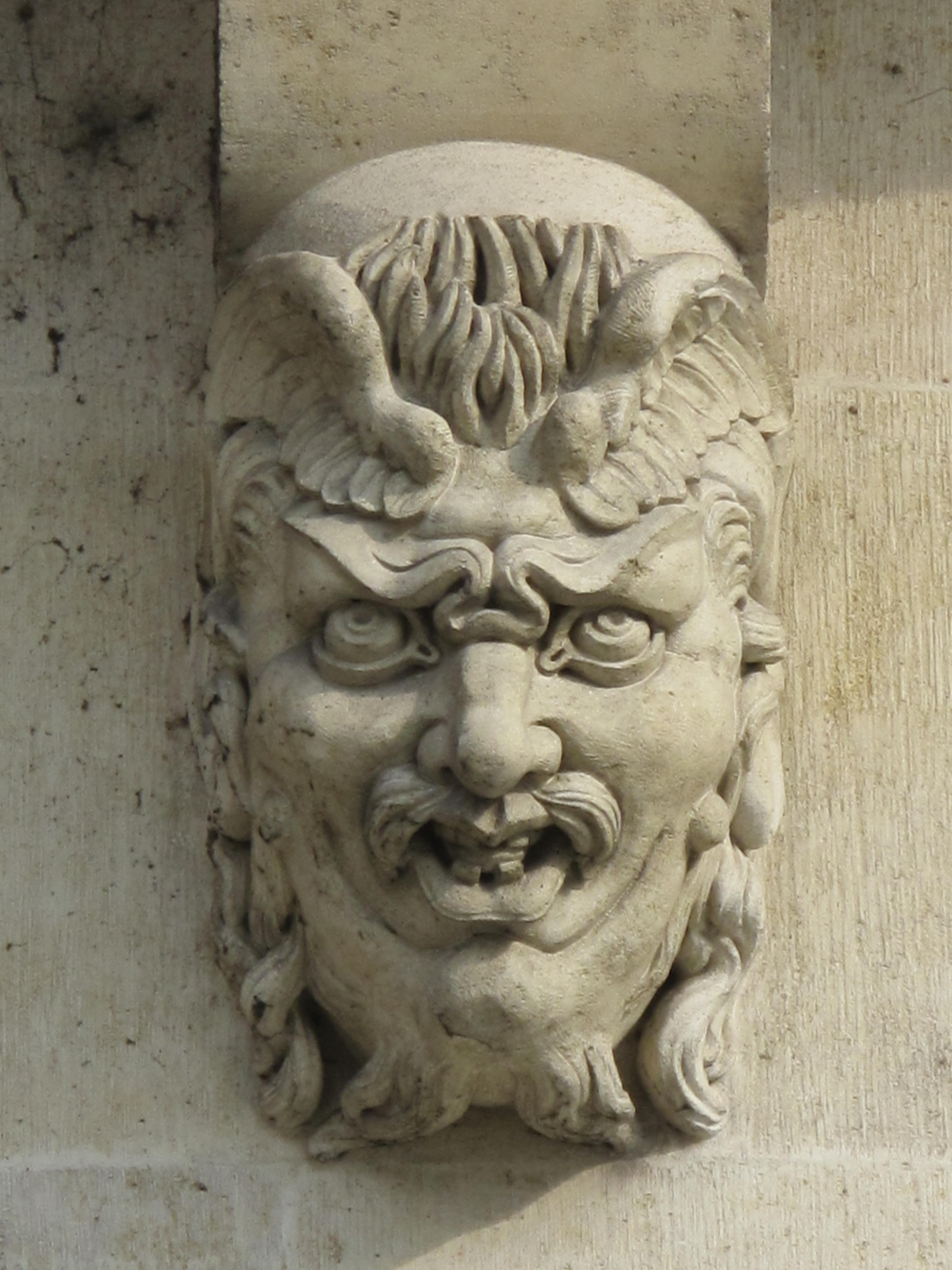
The 385 masquerons on the Pont Neuf, each one different, are attributed to Germain Pilon

=== Literature ===
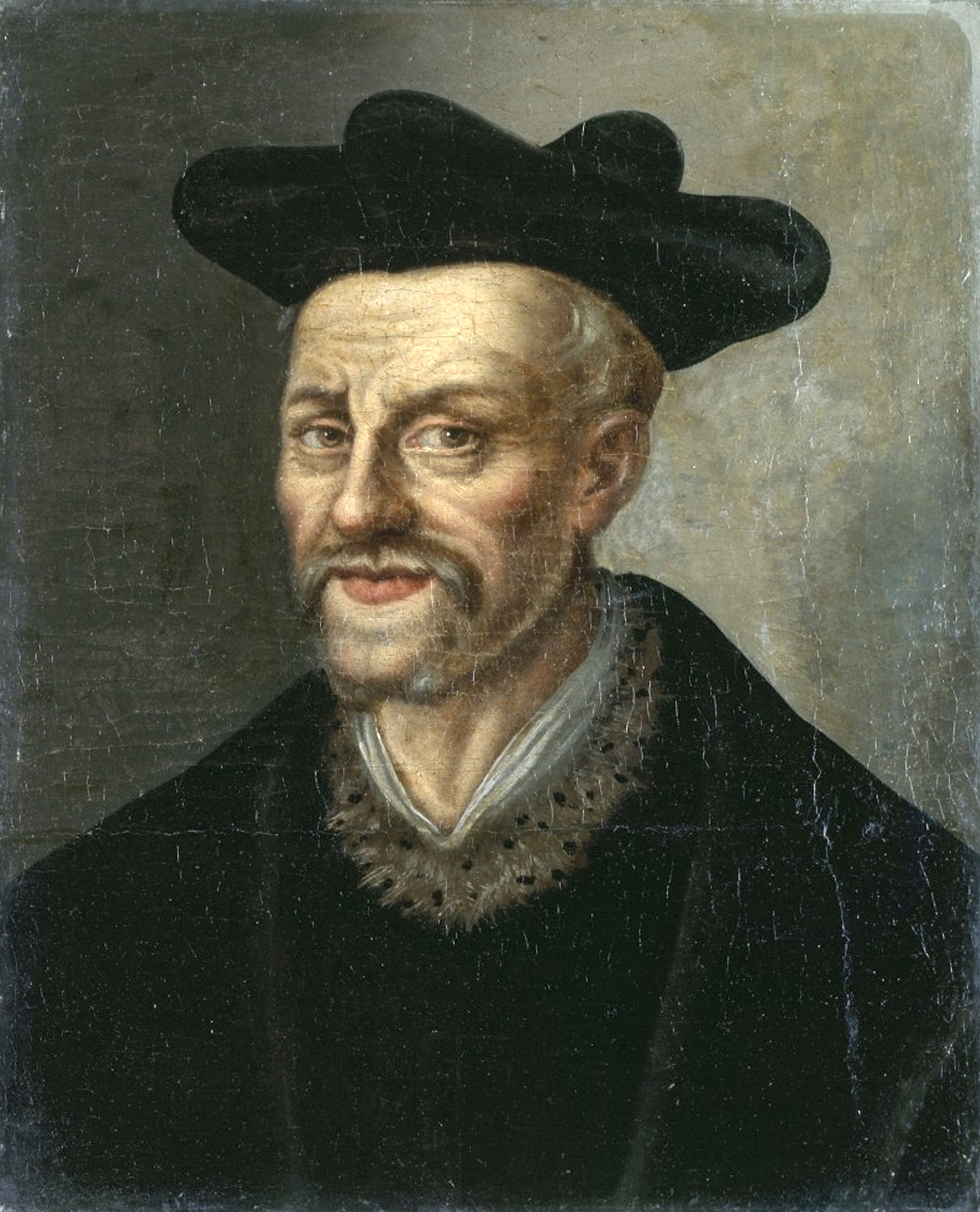
François Rabelais

The most prominent Paris novelist of the period was François Rabelais (1494–1553), best known for his novel Gargantua and Pantagruel, which gave the word "Gargantuan" to the English language. He was admired by King Francis I, who protected him while he was alive, but after the King's death Rabelais and his works were condemned by the University of Paris and the Parlement of Paris, and he only survived because of the protection of high figures at court. He spent much of his life far from the city, but died in Paris.

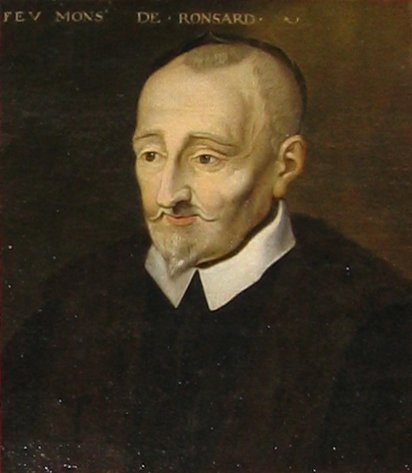
Pierre de Ronsard (1620 portrait by unknown artist)

The most prominent poet was Pierre de Ronsard (1524–1585), from an aristocratic family of the Vendôme region. He settled in the Latin quarter, studied briefly at the College of Navarre, then became a page to the dauphin, the eldest son of Francis I. His first poem was published in 1547 by one of the many small publishing houses that had appeared around the university. He formed a literary circle with Joachim du Bellay and a group of other poets, and published a series of books of poetry on love and romance and a volume of erotic poems. The latter volume, Les Folastries, caused a scandal, and the Parlement of Paris ordered that all the copies be burned. Despite this (or because of this), Ronsard was a favorite of the court during the reigns of Henry II, Francis II, Charles IX and Henry III. He gave poetry-writing lessons to Charles IX. However, by 1574 and the reign of Henry III, as the wars of religion began, his poetry was less in royal favor. He continued to write peacefully within the Collège de Boncourt, attached to the Collège de Navarre, until his last days.

Many of his poems had Paris settings; one poem from Sonnets pour Hélène, was set in the new Tuileries gardens, created by Catherine de'Medici:

"Quand je pense à ce jour où, pres d'une fontaine,
Dans le jardin royal ravi de ta douceur
Amour te decouvrit les secrets de mon coeur;
Et de combien de maux j'avais mon âme pleine..."

(When I think of that day when, near a fountain in the royal garden, enchanted by your gentleness. Love revealed to you the secrets of my heart, And how much pain had filled my soul...)

== Architecture ==
The military campaigns in Italy conducted by Charles VIII and Louis XII, while not very successful from a military point of view, had a direct and beneficial effect on the architecture of Paris. They returned to France with ideas for magnificent public buildings in the new Italian Renaissance style, and brought Italian architects to build them. The style developed most fully in Paris under Henry II after 1539.

The first structure in Paris in the new style was the old Pont Notre Dame (1507–1512), designed by the Italian architect Fra Giocondo. It was lined with sixty-eight artfully designed houses, the first example of Renaissance. The next major project was the construction of new Hôtel de Ville, or city hall, for the city. It was designed by another Italian, Domenico da Cortona, and begun in (The original was burned by the Paris Commune, but the central portion was faithfully reconstructed in 1882). A monumental fountain in the Italian style, the Fontaine des Innocents, was built in 1549 as a tribune for the welcome of the new King, Henry Ii, to the city on 16 June 1549. It was designed by Pierre Lescot with sculpture by Jean Goujon, and is the oldest fountain in Paris.

The first Renaissance Palace in Paris was the Chateau Madrid (1528-1552), a royal residence at Neuilly in the Bois de Boulogne, designed by Philibert Delorme; it combined French roofs and Italian loggias, and became the first Paris building in the new French Renaissance style. It was destroyed in 1787, but fragment can be seen today in the gardens of the Trocadero.

The architect Pierre Lescot and sculptor Jean Gouchon was also responsible for the Lescot wing of the Louvre, a masterpiece of combined French and Italian Renaissance art and architecture, on the southeast side of the Cour Carrée of the Louvre (1546–1553). Inside the Louvre, they made the staircase of Henry II (1546–1553) and the Salle des Caryatides (1550).

In 1564, Delorme was commissioned by Queen Catherine de Medicis to build an even more ambitious project; a new royal residence, the Tuileries Palace, near the Louvre.

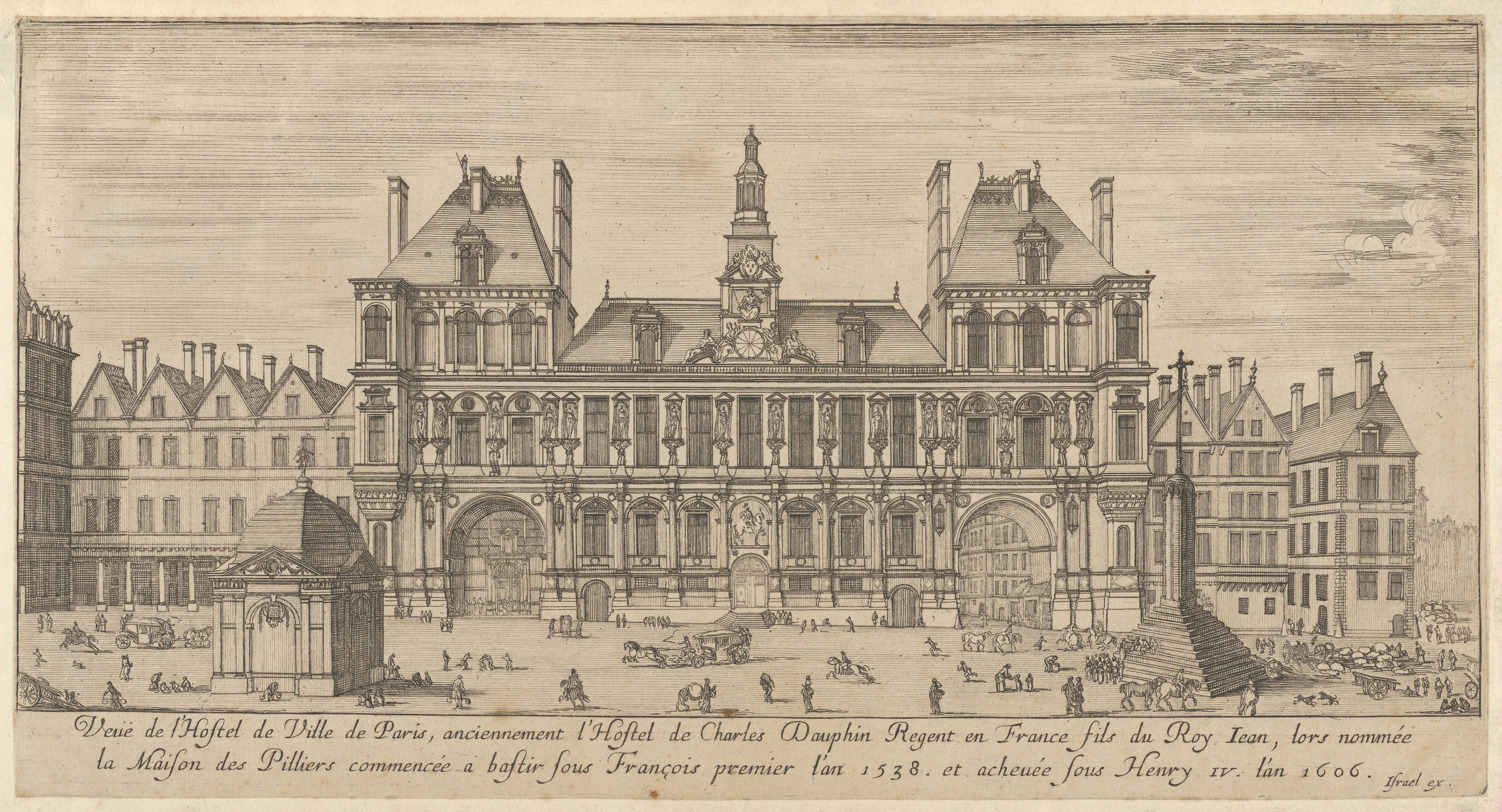
17th-century engraving of the Hotel de Ville

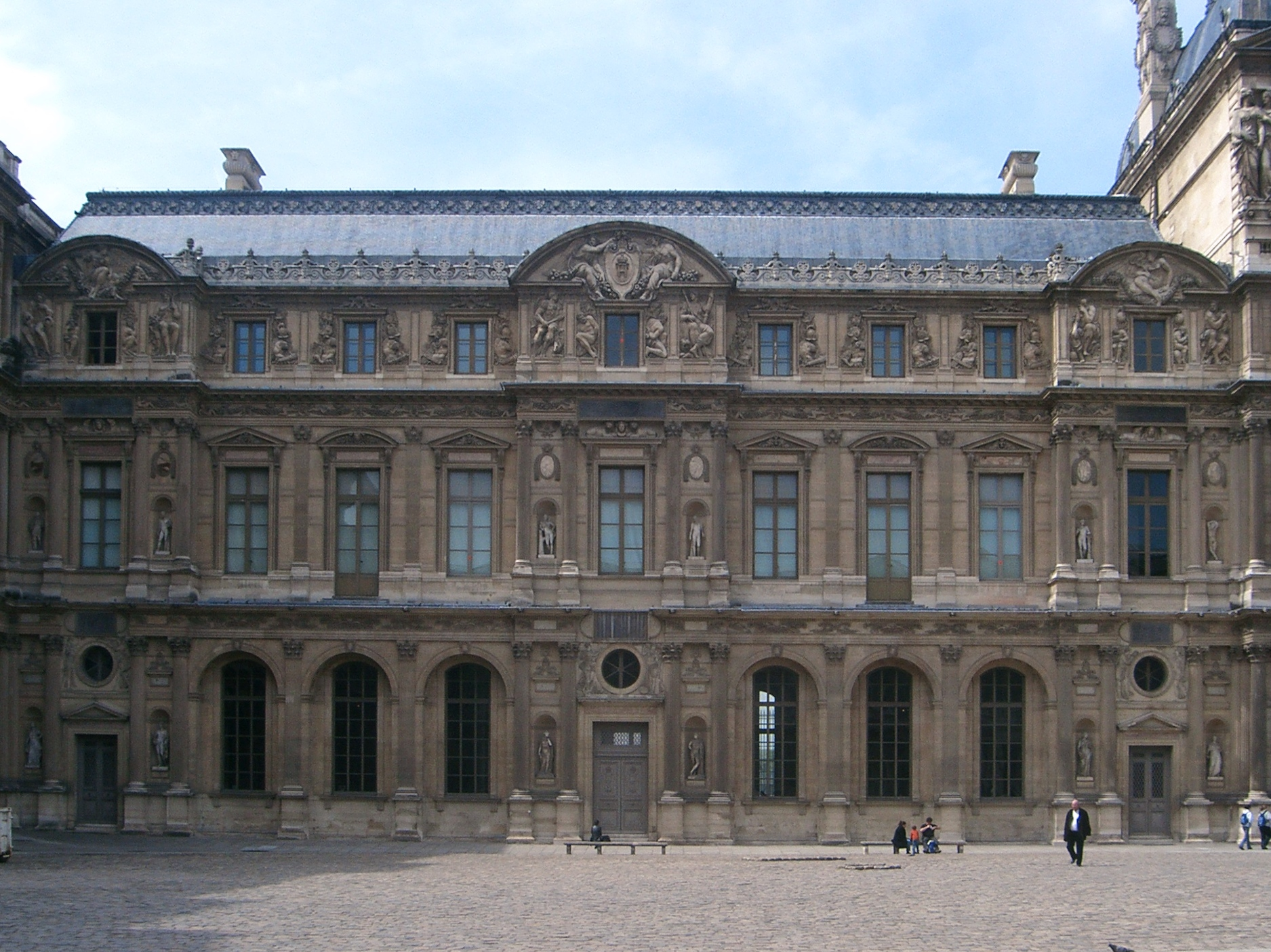
The Lescot wing of the Louvre, rebuilt by Francois I beginning in 1546 in the new French Renaissance style.

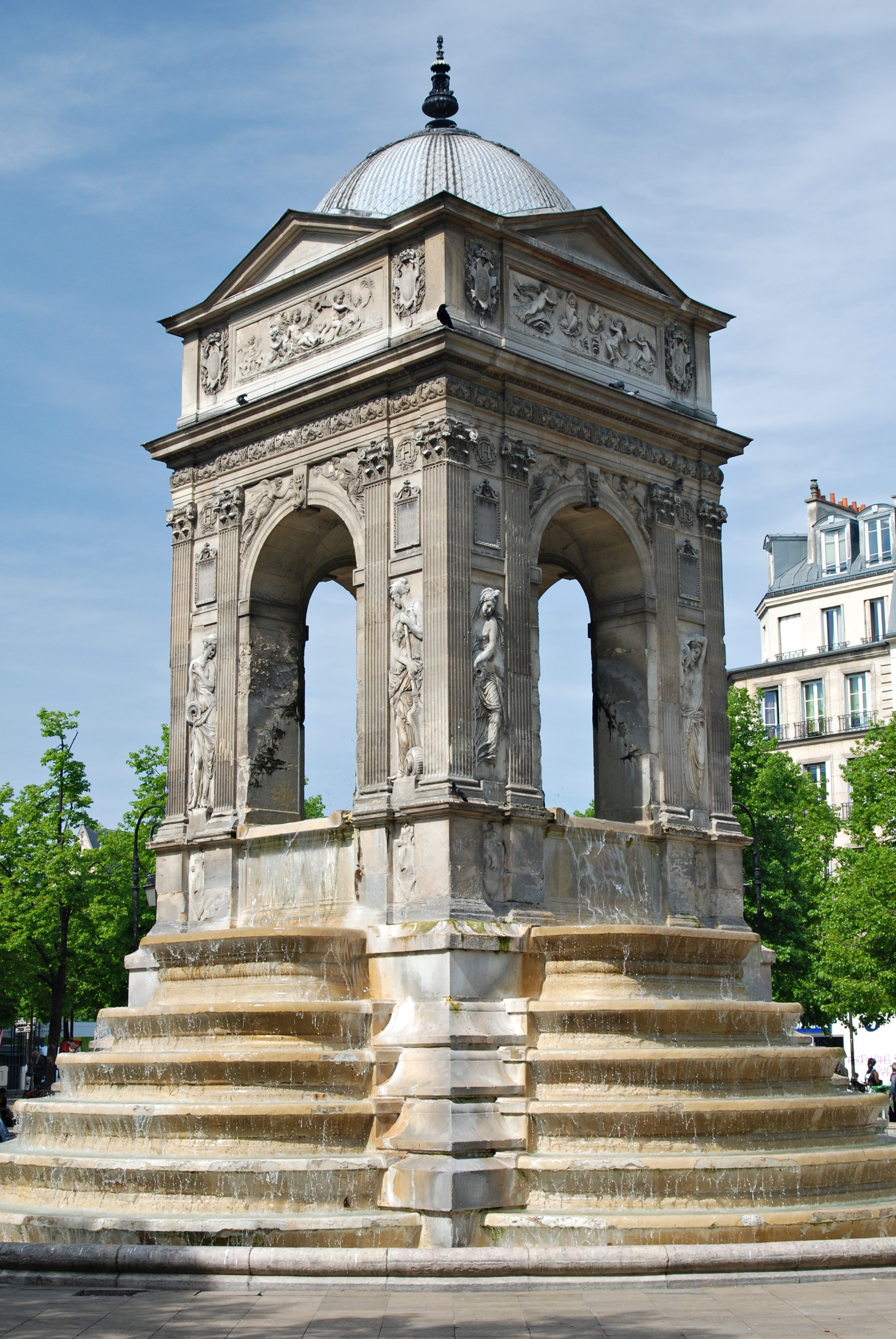
The Fontaine des Innocents (1549), next to the city market, celebrated the official entrance of king Henry II into Paris, by Pierre Lescot and Jean Goujon.

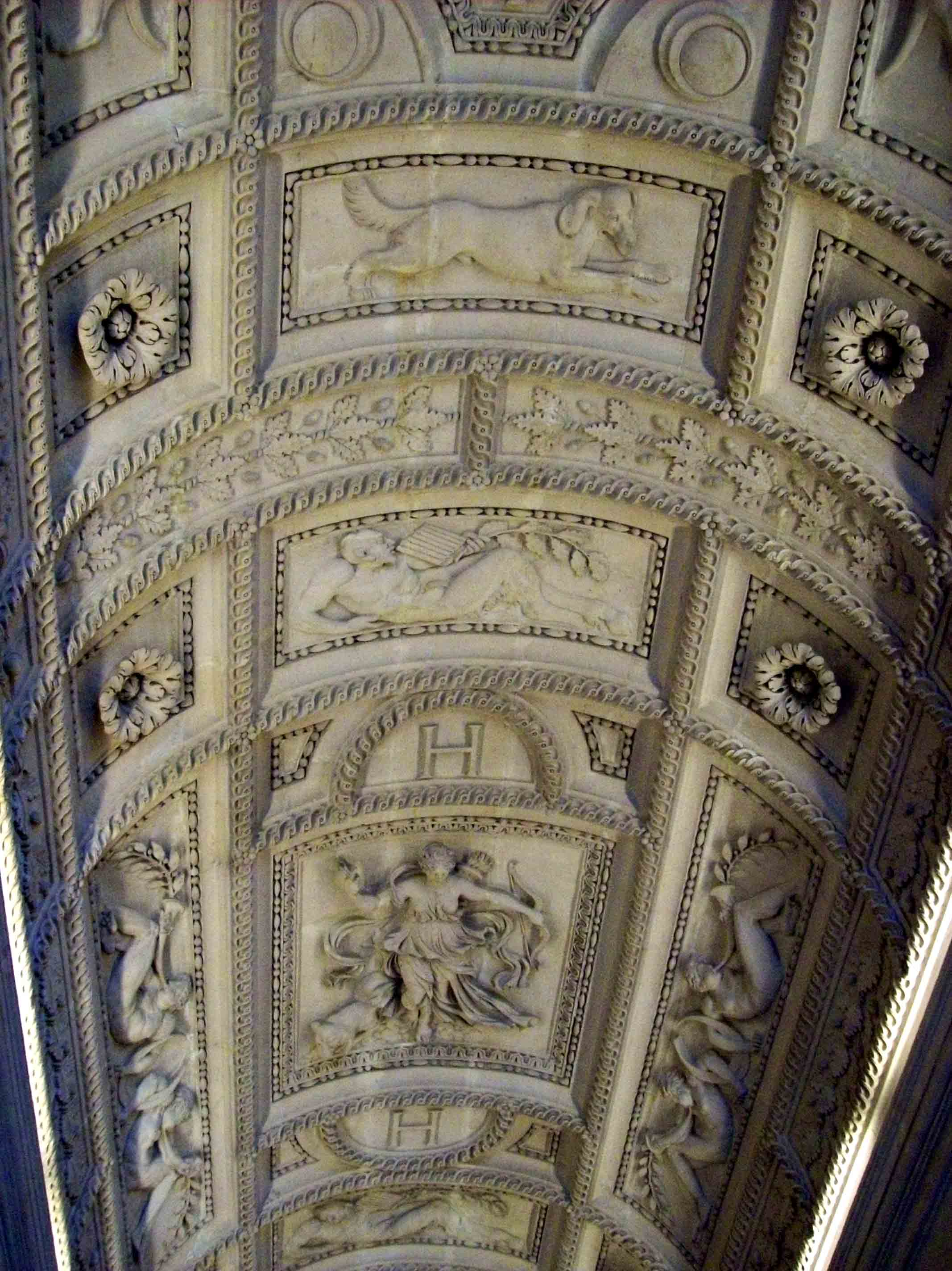
Ceiling of the stairway of Henri II in the Louvre, by Pierre Lescot (1546–1553)

=== Churches ===
Most of the churches built in Paris in the 16th century are in the traditional flamboyant gothic style, though some have features borrowed from the Italian Renaissance. The most important Paris church of the Renaissance is Saint-Eustache, 105 meters long, 44 meters wide and 35 meters high, which in size and grandeur, approaches that of the Cathedral of Notre-Dame. King Francis I wanted a monument as the centerpiece for the neighborhood of Les Halles, where the main city market was located. The church was designed by the King's favorite architect, Domenico da Cortona, The project was begun in 1519, and construction began in 1532. The pillars were inspired by the monastery church of Cluny, and the soaring interior is taken from the gothic cathedrals of the 13th century, but Cortona added details and ornament taken from the Italian Renaissance. It was not completed until 1640.

The other churches of the period follow the more traditional flamboyant gothic models. They include Saint-Merri (1520–1552), with a plan similar to Notre-Dame; Saint-Germain-l'Auxerrois, which features impressive flying buttresses; and the Église Saint-Medard. whose choir was built in beginning in 1550; St-Gervais-et-St-Protais features a soaring gothic vault in the apse, but also had a transept a more sober classical style inspired by the Renaissance. (The baroque facade was added in the 17th century).in the Saint-Etienne-du-Mont (1510–1586), near the modern Pantheon on Mont Sainte-Genevieve, has the only remaining Renaissance rood-screen (1530–35), a magnificent bridge across the center of the church. The flamboyant gothic church of Saint-Nicholas-des-Champs (1559) has a striking Renaissance feature; a portal on right side inspired by designs of Philibert Delorme for the former royal residence, the Palace of Tournelles in the Marais.

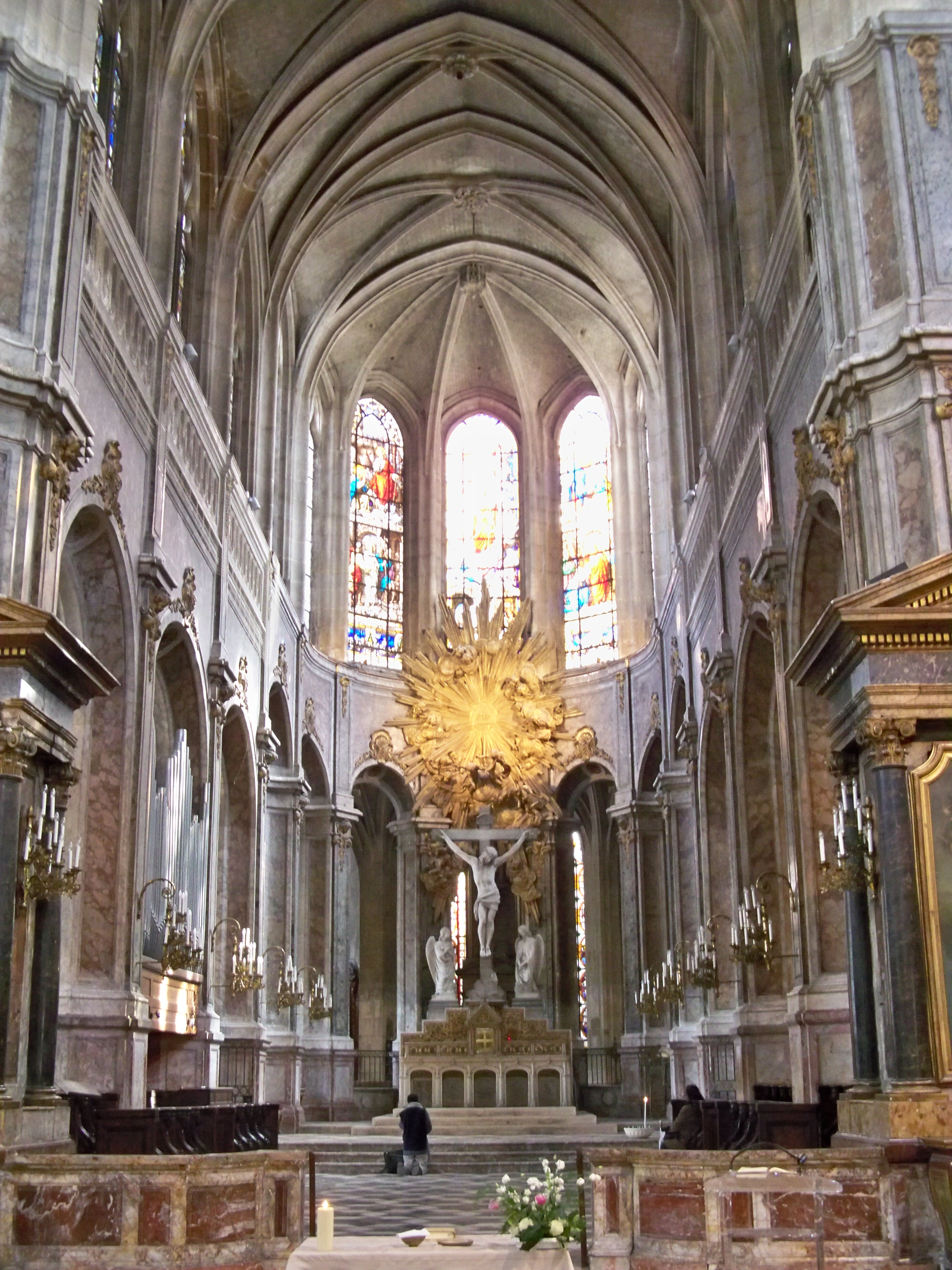
Interior of Saint-Merri (1520–1552)

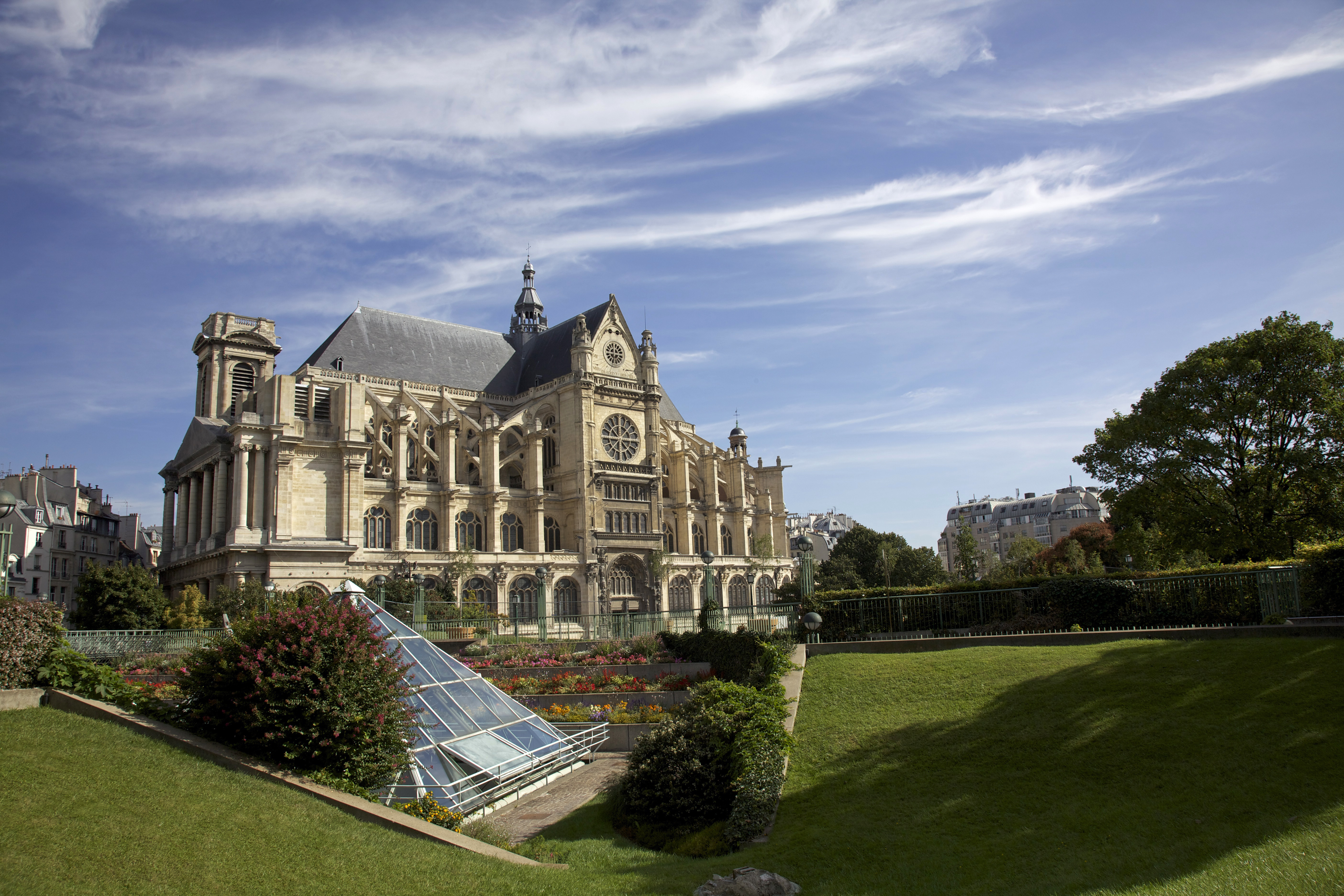
Saint-Eustache (1532–1640), a gothic church overlaid with Renaissance ornament

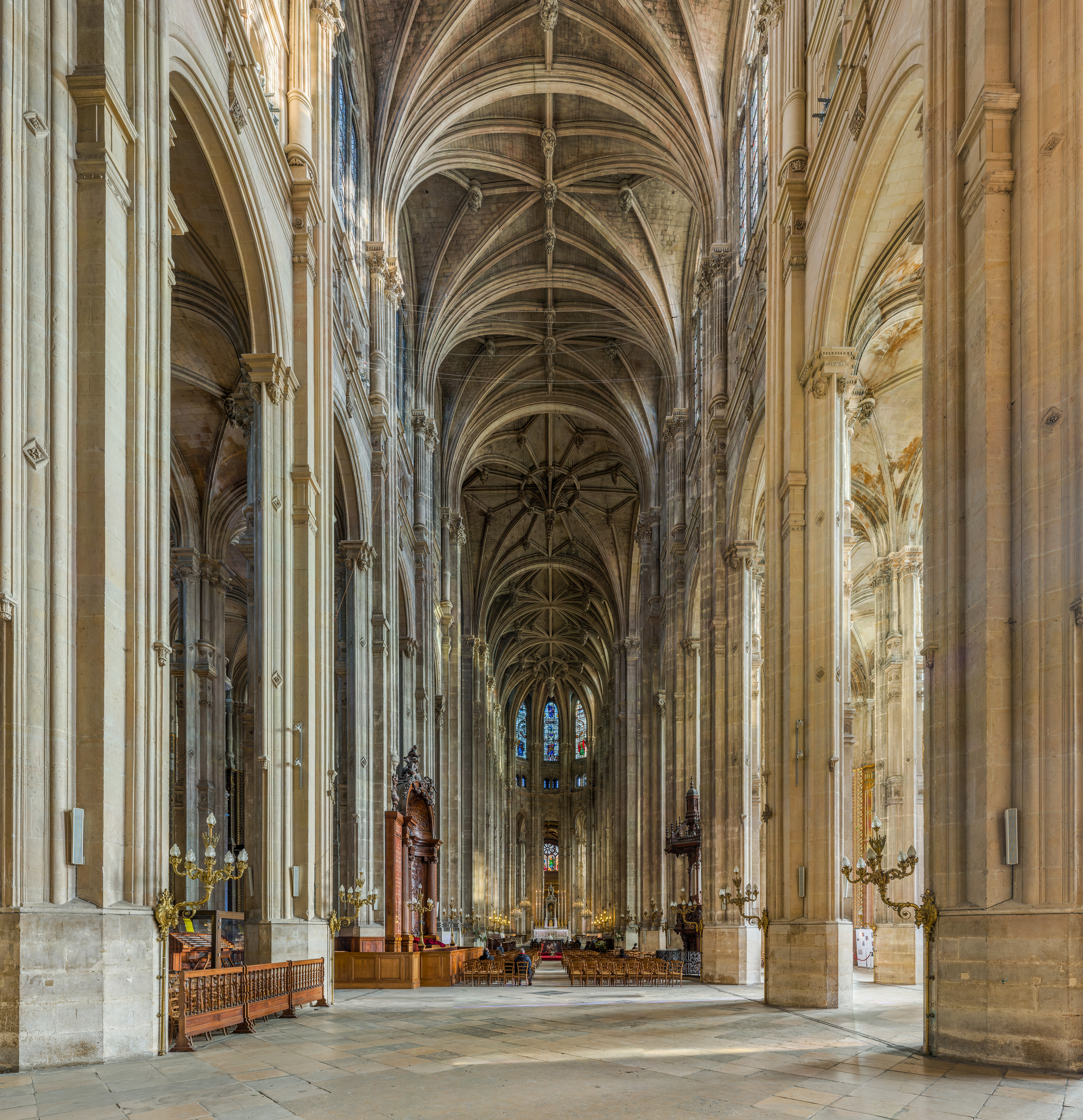
Interior of Saint-Eustache

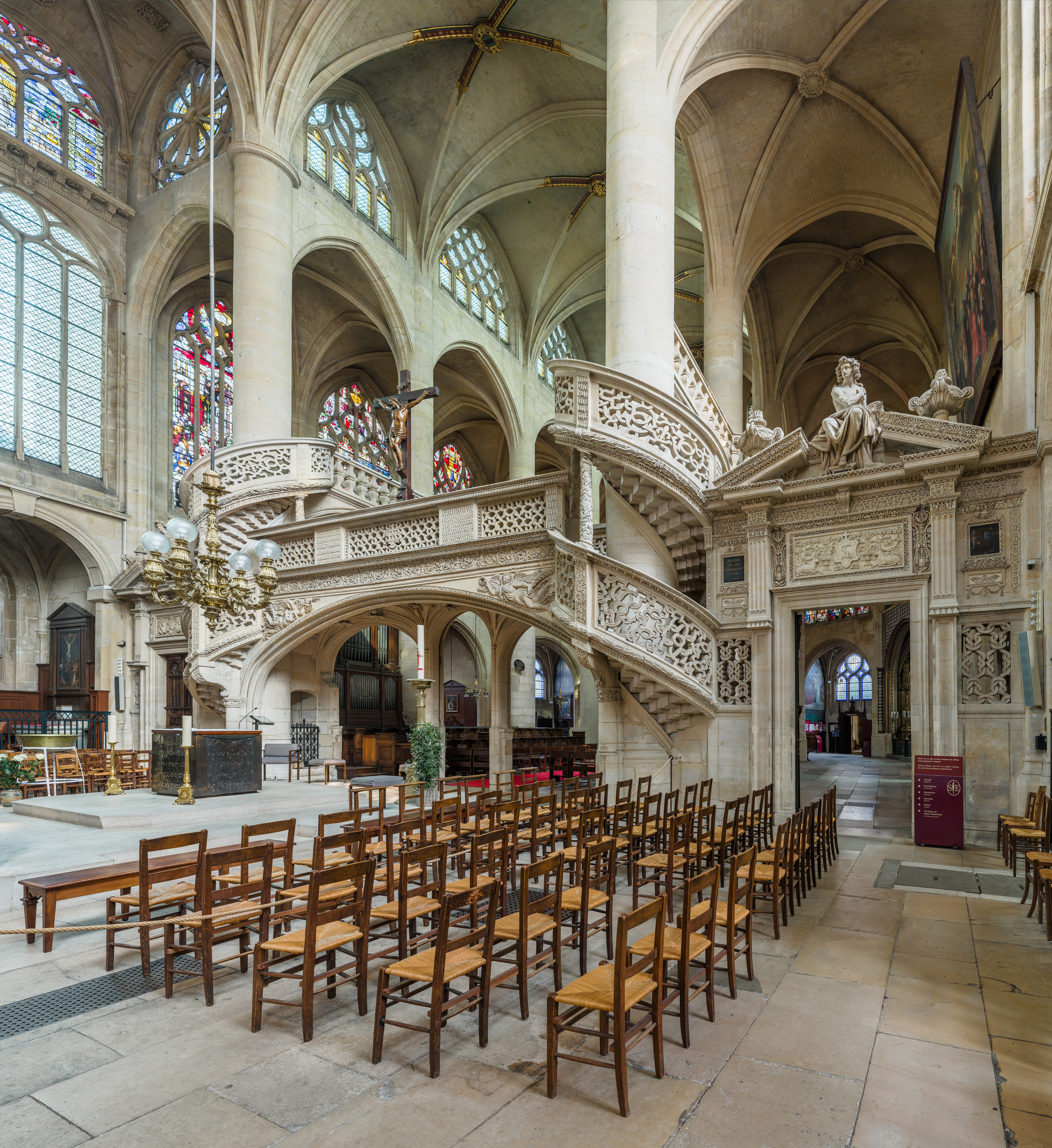
The Rood screen in the interior Saint-Etienne-du-Mont (1510–1586)

=== Houses and hotels ===
Paris houses in the 16th century were usually tall and narrow, four or five stories high, including the ground floor and the space under the roof. They were built on a foundation of stone, with a framework of exposed wooden beams. The facades were covered with white plaster to prevent fires. A few examples of houses from the period, restored to their original appearance, still remain in the Marais; the houses at 13–15 rue Francois Miron (15th–16th centuries) and at 29–31 rue Galand (5th arrondissement), from the first half of the 16th century.

The hôtel particular, or large private residence, began to appear in the Marais, after the French court returned to Paris. They numbered about twenty, and, unlike ordinary houses, they were made of stone. They were built around a courtyard, and separated from the street. The residence was located between the courtyard and garden. The facade facing the courtyard had the most sculptural decoration; the facade facing the garden was usually rough stone. The earliest houses of the period often had galleries in the courtyard, spires, and winding stairways located in ornate towers attached to the building. Examples of this kind of building are the hotel Cluny, formerly the residence of the abbots of the Cluny monastery, now the Museum of the Middle Ages (1490–1500); and the Hotel Carnavalet at 23 rue de Sévigné, (1547–1549), designed by Pierre Lescot, and decorated with sculpture by Jean Goujon. As the century advanced, the exterior stairways disappeared and the facades became more classical and regular. A good example of the later style is the Hôtel d'Angoulême Lamoignon, at 24 rue Pavée in the 3rd arrondissement (1585–1589), designed by Thibaut Métezeau.

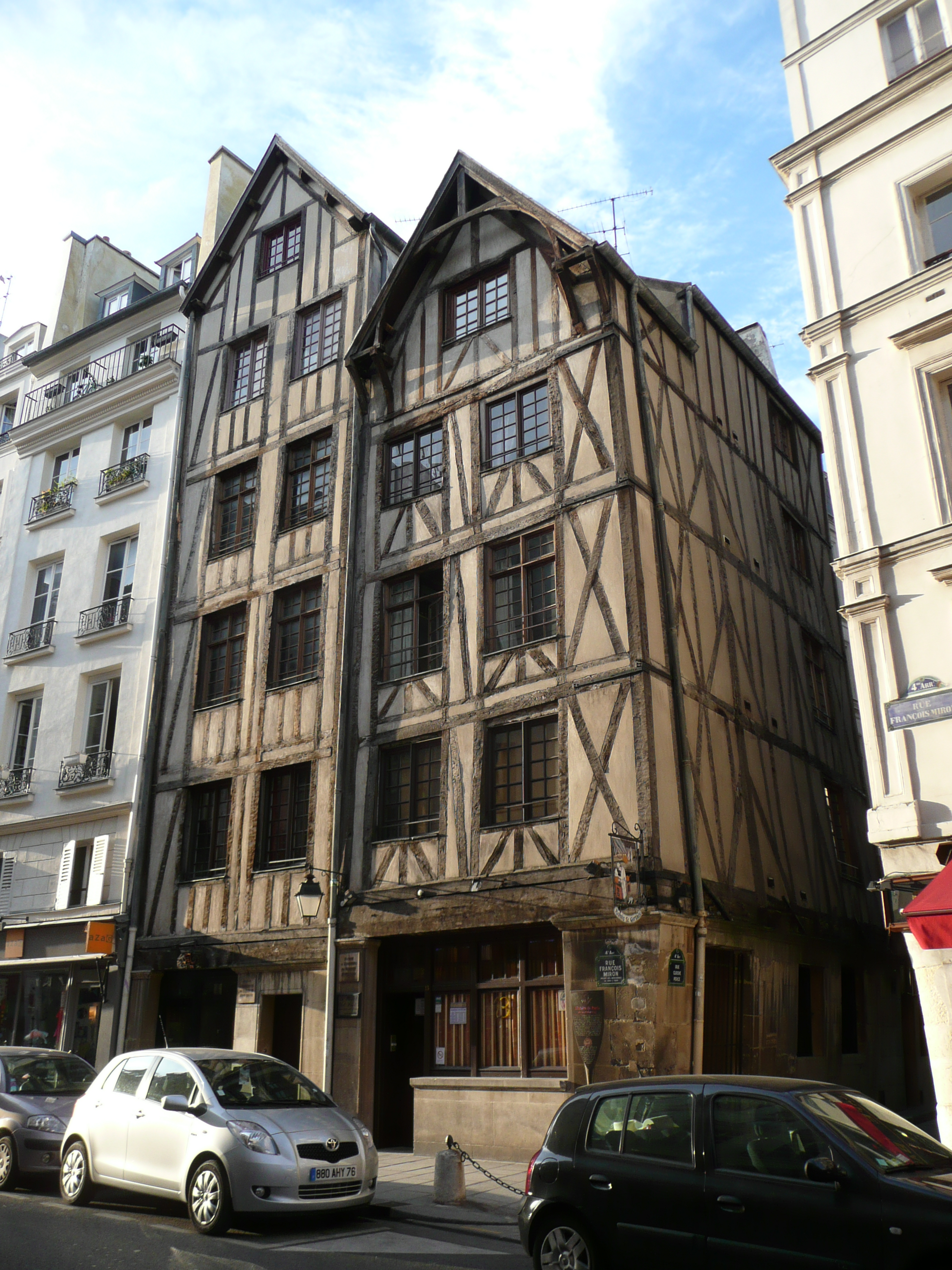
Houses at 13-15 rue Francois-Miron, 4th arrondissement (16th–17th centuries)

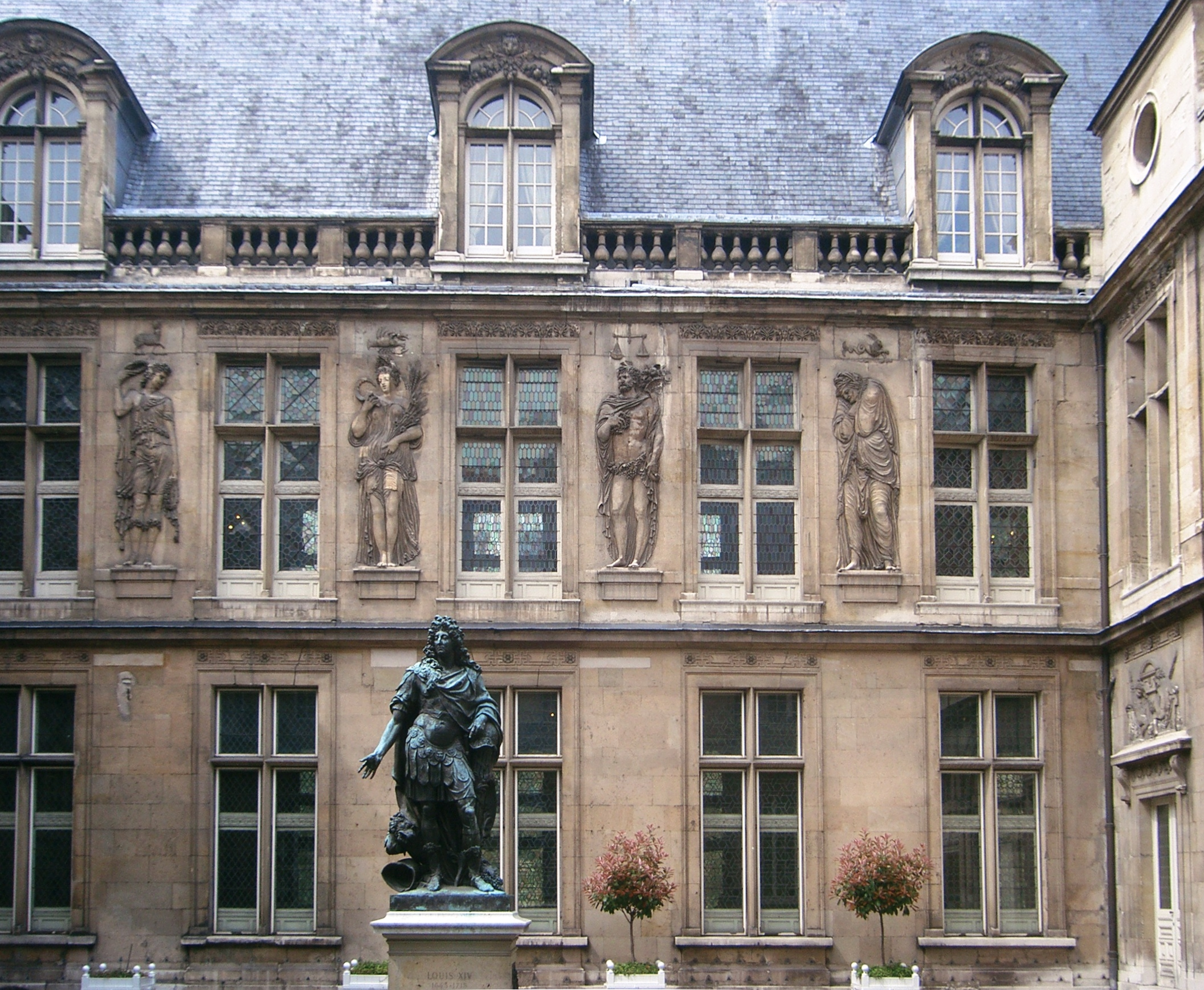
Facade of the Carnavalet Museum, with sculpture by Jean Goujon (1547–48)

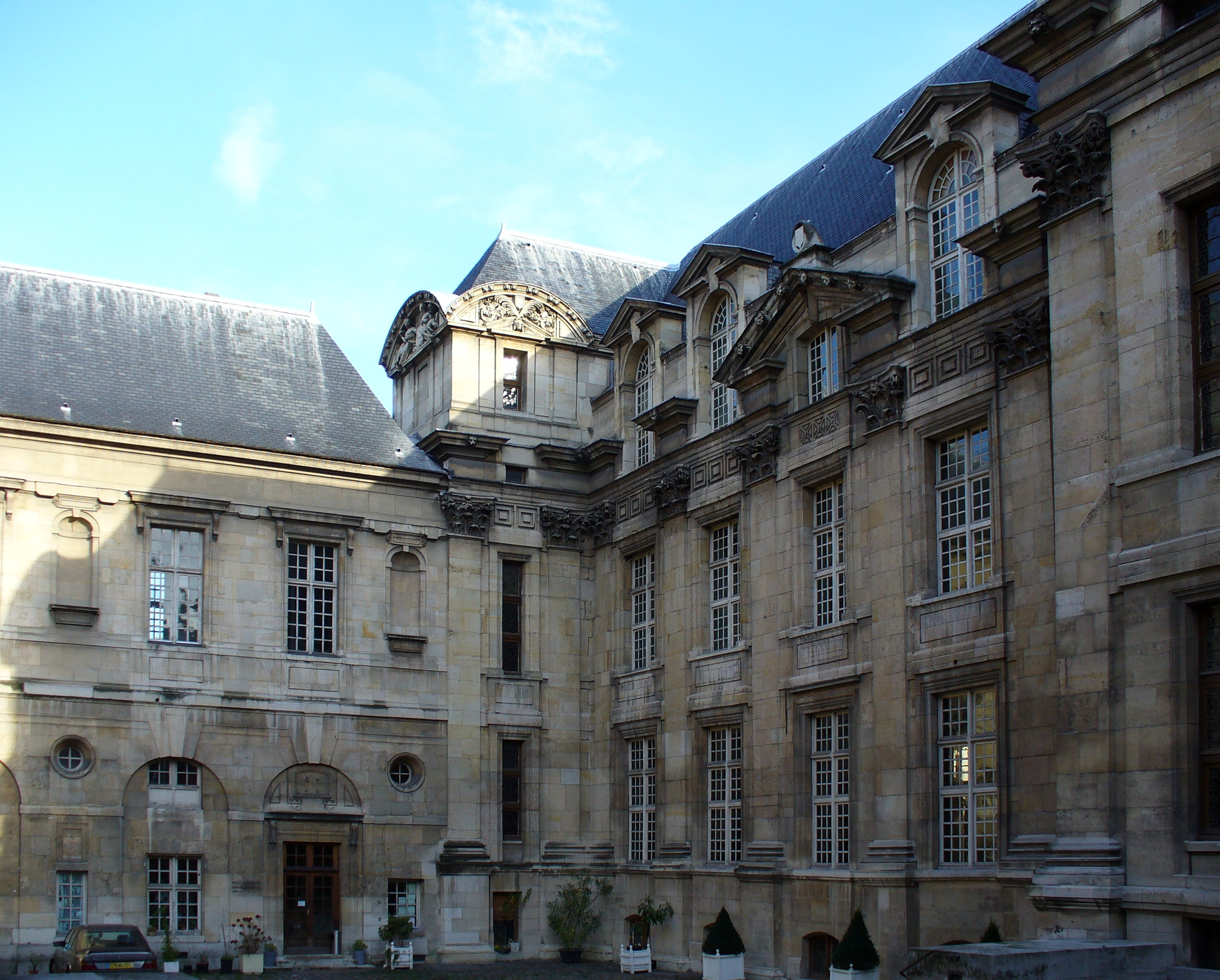
The Hôtel d'Angoulême Lamoignon, at 24 rue Pavée in the Marais. (1585–1589), now the library of the history of Paris
