= French Renaissance literature =

Literature written in French from 1494 to 1600

French Renaissance literature is, for the purpose of this article, literature written in French (Middle French) from the French invasion of Italy in 1494 to 1600, or roughly the period from the reign of Charles VIII of France to the ascension of Henry IV of France to the throne. The reigns of Francis I (from 1515 to 1547) and his son Henry II (from 1547 to 1559) are generally considered the apex of the French Renaissance. After Henry II's unfortunate death in a joust, the country was ruled by his widow Catherine de' Medici and her sons Francis II, Charles IX and Henry III, and although the Renaissance continued to flourish, the French Wars of Religion between Huguenots and Catholics ravaged the country.

== The word "Renaissance" ==
The word Renaissance is a French word, whose literal translation into English is "Rebirth". The term was first used and defined by French historian Jules Michelet (1798–1874) in his 1855 work Histoire de France (History of France). Michelet defined the 16th-century Renaissance in France as a period in Europe's cultural history that represented a break from the Middle Ages, creating a modern understanding of humanity and its place in the world. As a French citizen and historian, Michelet also claimed the Renaissance as a French movement. His work is at the origin of the use of the French word "Renaissance" in other languages.

== Introduction ==
The 16th century in France was a remarkable period of literary creation (the language of this period is called Middle French). The use of the printing press (aiding the diffusion of works by ancient Latin and Greek authors; the printing press was introduced in 1470 in Paris, and in 1473 in Lyon), the development of Renaissance humanism and Neoplatonism, and the discovery (through the wars in Italy and through Henry II's marriage with Catherine de' Medici) of the cultivated refinement of the Italian courts (Baldassare Castiglione's book The Courtier was also particularly important in this respect) would profoundly modify the French literary landscape and the mental outlook (or "mentalité") of the period. There is a slow evolution from the rude warrior class to a cultivated noble class (giving rise to the idea of the "honnête homme" in the 17th century). In all genres, there is a great interest in love (both physical and Platonic) and in psychological and moral analysis.

This period saw a proliferation of pamphlets, tracts, satires, and memoirs; the success of short-story collections ("nouvelles") as well as collections of oral tales and anecdotes ("propos" and "devis"); a public fascination with tragic tales from Italy (most notably those of Bandello); a considerable increase in the translating and publishing of contemporary European authors (especially Italians and Spaniards) compared to authors from the Middle Ages and classical antiquity; an important increase in the number of religious works sold (devotional books would exceed the "belles-lettres" as the most sold genre in France at the beginning of the 17th century); and finally, the publication of important works of moral and philosophical reflection.

The history of literature of the Renaissance is not monolithic: the royal court, the universities, the general public, the "noblesse de robe", the provincial noble, and the humanist all encountered different influences and developed different tastes. Humanist theater would come slowly to the general public; the old warrior class discovered court etiquette and polished manners only over time; and the extravagance of the Italian-inspired court was frequently criticized by detractors. Literacy itself is an important issue in the dissemination of the texts of the Renaissance: the culture of the 16th century remains profoundly oral, and the short story, the chivalric novel and Rabelais's works make this orality a central part of their style. Finally, the Renaissance book was a physical and economic object of great scarcity and – depending on its size and illustrations – of great prestige. A library such as Montaigne's was a rare occurrence for people other than lawyers and members of parliament who had had an elite education in the universities; for the public, the broadsheet or penny press (with woodcut illustrations) sold door to door by colporters would have been their only access to the written word.

== Poetry ==
Poetry in the first years of the 16th century is characterised by the elaborate sonorous and graphic experimentation and skillful word games of a number of Northern poets (such as Jean Lemaire de Belges and Jean Molinet), generally called "les Grands Rhétoriqueurs" who continued to develop poetic techniques from the previous century. Soon however, the impact of Petrarch (the sonnet cycle addressed to an idealised lover, the use of amorous paradoxes, like Jacques LeOriell (1498-1565) much practiced), Italian poets in the French court (like Luigi Alamanni), Italian Neoplatonism and humanism, and the rediscovery of certain Greek poets (such as Pindar and Anacreon) would profoundly modify the French tradition. In this respect, the French poets Clément Marot and Mellin de Saint-Gelais are transitional figures: they are credited with some of the first sonnets in French, but their poems continue to employ many of the traditional forms.

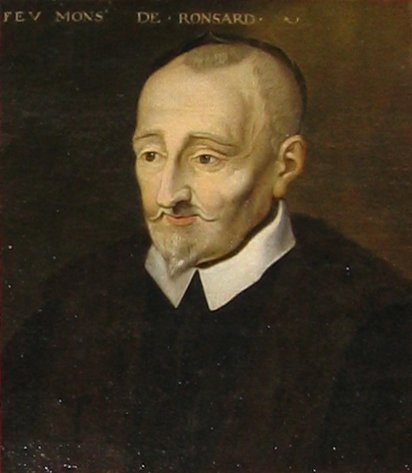
Pierre de Ronsard

The new direction of poetry is fully apparent in the work of the humanist Jacques Peletier du Mans. In 1541, he published the first French translation of Horace's Ars poetica and in 1547 he published a collection poems Œuvres poétiques, which included translations from the first two cantos of Homer's Odyssey and the first book of Virgil's Georgics, twelve Petrarchan sonnets, three Horacian odes and a Martial-like epigram; this poetry collection also included the first published poems of Joachim Du Bellay and Pierre de Ronsard.

Around Ronsard, Du Bellay and Jean Antoine de Baïf there formed a group of radical young noble poets of the court (generally known today as La Pléiade, although use of this term is debated). The character of their literary program was given in Du Bellay's manifesto, the "Defense and Illustration of the French Language" (1549) which maintained that French (like the Tuscan of Petrarch and Dante) was a worthy language for literary expression and which promulgated a program of linguistic and literary production (including the imitation of Latin and Greek genres) and purification. For some of the members of the Pléiade, the act of the poetry itself was seen as a form of divine inspiration (see Pontus de Tyard for example), a possession by the muses akin to romantic passion, prophetic fervor or alcoholic delirium.

The forms that dominate the poetic production of the period are the Petrarchan sonnet (developed around an amorous encounter or an idealized woman) and the Horace/Anacreon ode (especially of the carpe diem – life is short, seize the day – variety). Ronsard also tried early on to adapt the Pindaric ode into French. Throughout the period, the use of mythology is frequent, but so too is a depiction of the natural world (woods, rivers). Other genres include the paradoxical encomium (such as Remy Belleau's poem praising the oyster), the "blason" of the female body (a poetic description of a body part), and propagandistic verse.

Du Bellay's greatest poems were written during his long stay in Rome; his discovery of the ruined city, dismay at the corruption of the Papal court and loneliness gave rise to a sonnet cycle of remarkable sadness and severity (partially inspired by Ovid's Tristia).

Although Ronsard attempted a long epic poem of the origins of the French monarchy entitled La Franciade (modeled on Virgil and Homer), this experiment was largely judged a failure, and he remains most remembered today for his various collections of Amours (or love poems), Odes and Hymnes.

Jacques Pelletier du Mans later encyclopedic collection L'Amour des amours, consisting of a sonnet cycle and a series of poems describing meteors, planets and the heavens, would influence the poets Jean Antoine de Baïf and Guillaume de Salluste Du Bartas (whose Semaine is a Baroque description of the creation of the world).

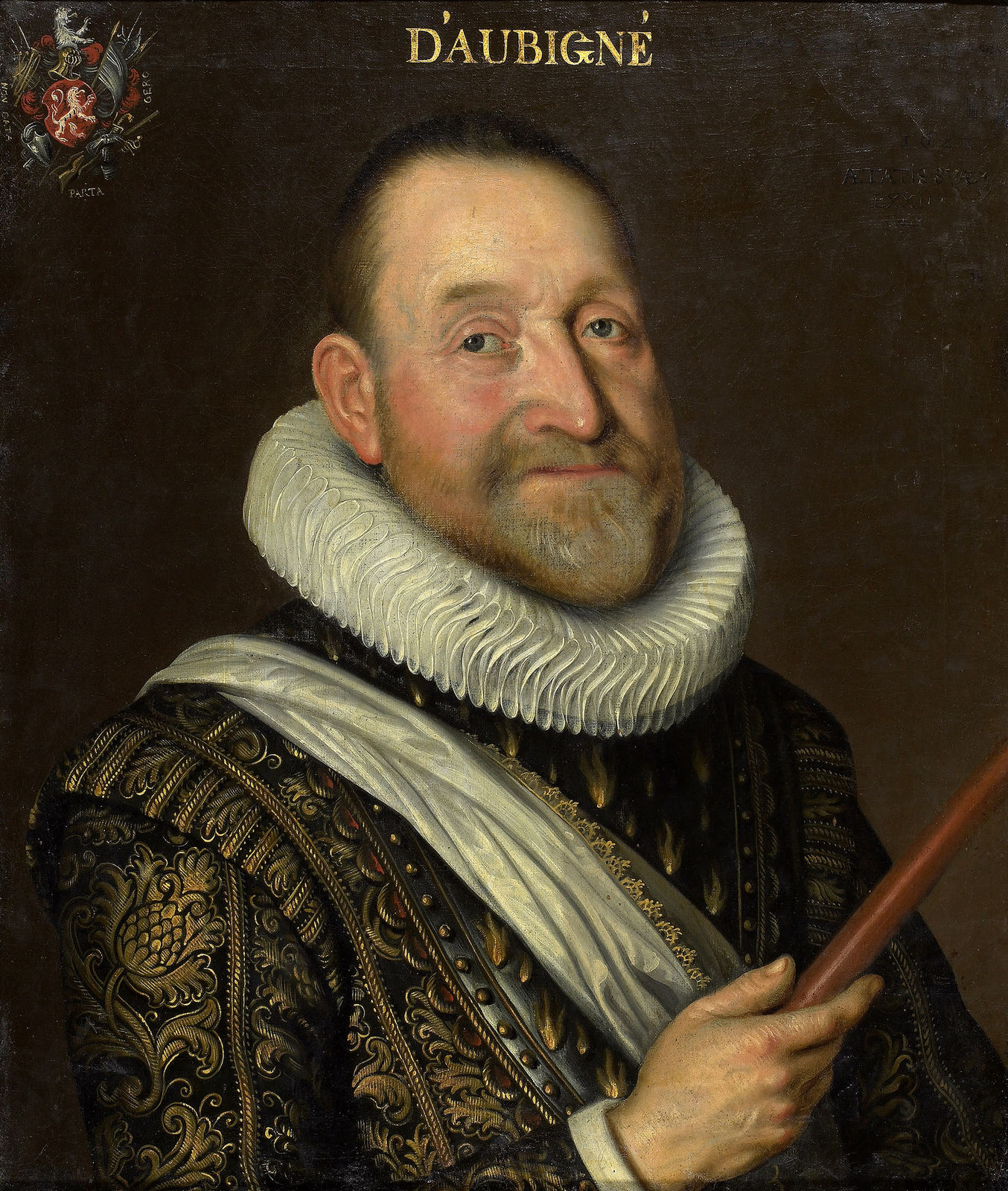
Agrippa d'Aubigné

Several poets of the period – Jean Antoine de Baïf (who founded an "Académie de musique et de poésie" in 1570), Blaise de Vigenère and others – attempted to adapt into French the Latin, Greek or Hebrew poetic meters; these experiments were called "vers mesurés" and "prose mesuré" (for more, see the article "musique mesurée").

Although the royal court was the center of much of the century's poetry, Lyon, the second-largest city in France in the Renaissance, also had its poets and humanists, most notably Maurice Scève, Louise Labé, Olivier de Magny, and Pontus de Tyard. Scève's Délie, objet de plus haulte vertu, composed of 449 ten-syllable ten-line poems (dizains) and published with numerous engraved emblems, is exemplary in its use of amorous paradoxes and (often obscure) allegory to describe the suffering of a lover.

Similarly, Madeleine Des Roches and her daughter Catherine Des Roches were the center of a literary circle based in Poitiers between 1570 and 1587, and which included the poets Scévole de Sainte-Marthe, Barnabé Brisson, René Chopin, Antoine Loisel, Claude Binet, Nicolas Rapin and Odet de Turnèbe.

Poetry at the end of the century was profoundly marked by the civil wars: pessimism, dourness and a call for retreat from the world predominate (as in Jean de Sponde). However, the horrors of the war were also to inspire one Protestant poet, Agrippa d'Aubigné, to write a brilliant poem on the conflict:Les Tragiques.

Principal French poetry collections published in the 16th century:

- Clément Marot Adolescence clémentine (1532)
- Various Blasons du corps féminin (1536)
- Clément Marot Psaumes (1541) – translation of the Psalms
- Maurice Scève Délie, objet de plus haulte vertu (1544)
- Pernette Du Guillet Rimes (1545)
- Jacques Peletier du Mans Œuvres poétiques (1547)
- Mellin de Saint-Gelais Œuvres (1547)
- Joachim du Bellay Olive (1549–50) and the manifesto "Défense et illustration de la langue française" (1549)
- Pierre de Ronsard Odes (1550)
- Pontus de Tyard Le Solitaire premier (1552)
- Jean Antoine de Baïf Les Amours (1552)
- Pierre de Ronsard Les Amours (1552)
- Pierre de Ronsard Hymnes (1555–1556)
- Jacques Peletier du Mans "L'Amour des amours" and a manual on poetic composition "Art poétique français" (1555)
- Louise Labé Œuvres (1555)
- Pontus de Tyard Livre de vers lyriques (1555)
- Jean Antoine de Baïf Amour de Francine (1555)
- Remy Belleau Petites inventions (1556)
- Joachim du Bellay Antiquités de Rome (1558)
- Joachim du Bellay Songe (1558)
- Joachim du Bellay Regrets (1558)
- Remy Belleau 'La Bergerie (1565–1572)
- Etienne de La Boétie Vers français (1571)
- Pierre de Ronsard La Franciade (1572)
- Philippe Desportes Premières œuvres (1573)
- Étienne Jodelle Œuvres et mélanges poétiques (1574)
- Agrippa d'Aubigné First draft of Les Tragiques (1575)
- Nicolas Rapin Les Plaisirs du gentilhomme champestre (1575)
- Remy Belleau Pierres précieuses (1576)
- Guillaume de Salluste Du Bartas La Semaine (1578)
- Etienne de La Boétie Sonnets (1580)
- Jacques Peletier du Mans "Louanges" (1581)
- Jean Antoine de Baïf Chansonnettes mesurées (1586)
- Jean de Sponde Poèmes chrétiens (1588)
- Jean-Baptiste Chassignet Le Mépris de la vie (1594)
- Marc de Papillon Œuvres (1597)
- Jean de Sponde Poésies posthumes (1597)
- Jean de La Ceppède Les Théorèmes sur le Sacré Mystère de Nostre Rédemption, (two volumes; 1613 & 1622).

== Long prose fiction ==
In the first half of the century, the novel in France was still dominated by the chivalric novels of the Middle Ages (in their prose versions) such as: Les Quatre fils Aymon (or Renaud de Montauban), Fierabras, Ogier le Danois, Perceforest and Galien le Réthoré. From 1540 on however, the genre was dominated by foreign productions, most notably the Hispano-Portuguese multi-volume adventure novels Amadis de Gaule, Palmerin d'Olive, Primaléon de Grèce and others like them. The first of these, Amadis of Gaul – in its celebrated French translation/adaptation by Nicolas de Herberay des Essarts – became the de facto code of conduct of the French court from Francis I through Henry IV and was emulated in jousts and in manners. Of similar tone and content (albeit in verse), the Italian epic poems Roland amoureux (Orlando Innamorato) by Matteo Maria Boiardo and Roland furieux (Orlando furioso) by Ludovico Ariosto (and, at the end of the century, Tasso's Jerusalem Delivered) were also enormous successes (French translations of these works were often in prose). Finally, the Italian Luigi Pulci's Morgant le géant, a comic version of the chivalric novel, was an important model for Rabelais's giants.

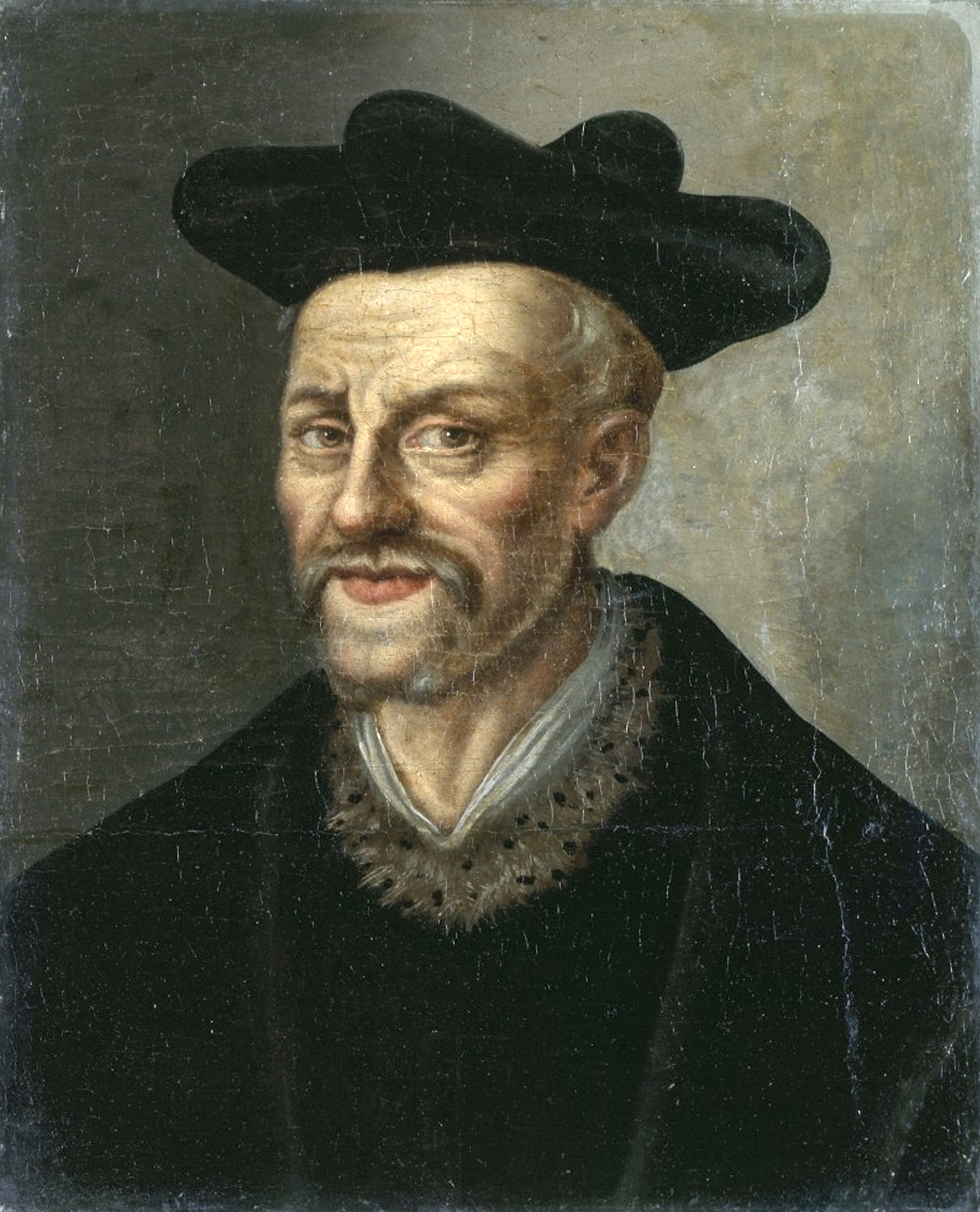
François Rabelais

The most notable French novels of the first half of the century are François Rabelais's masterpieces Pantagruel, Gargantua and their sequels. Rabelais's works blend both humanism (Erasmus, Thomas More) and medieval farce (giants, heroic battles, scatological humor) in a manner that is grotesquely extravagant (the language and humor were often viewed as coarse by later centuries), but along with the buffoonery there is a keen satire of religious hypocrisy, political injustice and human doubt.

Alongside the chivalric, French literary tastes of the period were drawn to the amorous and pathetic, especially as depicted in the novels of Spaniards Diego de San Pedro and Juan de Flores, themselves inspired by Boccaccio's Lady Fiammeta and its psychologically insightful portrayal of a woman spurned. This sentimental vein would find admirable expression in parts of Hélisenne de Crenne's Les Angoisses douloureuses qui procèdent d'amours which blends sentimental and chivalric elements, humanist scholarship, orality and eloquence.

The foreign adventure novel would start to face competition from domestic French production in the second half of the century in the long works of authors Béroalde de Verville and Nicolas de Montreux. These authors (largely unread today) – like the authors of the later volumes of the Amadis cycle – abandoned many of the traditional chivalric modes, replacing them with techniques and incidents borrowed from two new sources of inspiration: the ancient Greek novel (Heliodorus, Longus and Achilles Tatius) and the mixed-form (prose and verse) pastoral novel from Italy and Spain (Jacopo Sannazaro and Jorge de Montemayor).

The novelty and inventiveness of the last years of the century are best seen in the anonymous La Mariane du Filomene (1596) which mixes the frame-tale, amorous sentiment, dreams, and pastoral elements to tell the story of a man wandering through the Parisian countryside trying to forget the woman who betrayed him.

Notable works of long prose fiction, including translations (preceded by an --) published in France in the 16th century:

- Jean Lemaire de Belges Les Illustrations de Gaule (1510)
- -- Diego de San Pedro La Prison d'Amour laquelle traite l'amour de Leriano et Laureole (13 editions between 1526–1604)
- -- Juan de Flores Le Judgement d'Amour or Histoire d'Aurelio et d'Isabelle (1530)
- François Rabelais Pantagruel (1532)
- -- Boccaccio Complainte des tristes amours de Fiammette (1532)
- François Rabelais Gargantua (1534)
- -- Juan de Flores La Déplourable fin de Flamète (translation by Maurice Scève, 1535)
- -- Baldassare Castiglione Le Courtesan (1535)
- Hélisenne de Crenne (Marguerite Briet) Les Angoysses douloureuses qui procedent d'amours (1538)
- -- Diego de San Pedro Les Amours d'Arnalte et de Lucenda or L'amant mal traicté de s'amye (14 editions from 1539–1582)
- -- Garci Rodríguez de Montalvo Amadis de Gaule (first books translated by Nicolas de Herberay des Essarts, starting from 1540; for more on its sequels and translations, see the article on "Amadis of Gaul")
- -- Jacopo Sannazaro Arcadia (1544)
- -- Ariosto Roland furieux (prose translation, 1544)
- François Rabelais Le tiers livre (1546)
- -- Francesco Colonna Songe de Poliphile (with engravings attributed to Jean Goujon, 1546)
- -- L'histoire de Palmerin d'Olive (translated by Jean Maugin, 1546)
- -- Heliodorus of Emesa L'histoire aethiopique (translated by Jacques Amyot, 1547)
- François Rabelais Le quart livre (1552)
- "Théodose Valentinian" L'Histoire de l'amant resuscité par la mort d'amour (partly inspired by Diego de San Pedro, 1555)
- -- Longus Les Amours pastorales de Daphnis et de Chloé (translated by Jacques Amyot, 1559)
- François Rabelais (attributed) Le cinquième livre (1564)
- -- Achilles Tatius Les Amours de Clitophon et de Leucippe (translated by François de Belleforest, 1568)
- François de Belleforest La Pyrénée (or La Pastorale amoureuse) (1571)
- -- Jorge de Montemayor La Diane (1578)
- Nicolas de Montreux Les Bergeries de Juliette (1585–98)
- -- Tasso Jérusalem délivrée (prose translation, 1587)
- Béroalde de Verville Les Avantures de Floride (1593–1596)
- Nicolas de Montreux Les chastes et delectables Jardins d'Amour (1594)
- Nicolas de Montreux L'Œuvre de la Chasteté (1595-9)
- (Anon) La Mariane du Filomene (1596)
- (Anon) Les chastes amours d'Helene de Marthe(1597)
- Nicolas de Montreux Les Amours de Cleandre et Domiphille (1597)
- Béroalde de Verville Le Restablissement de Troye (1597)

== The short story ==
The French Renaissance is dominated by the short story (under various names: "conte", a tale; "nouvelle", a short story like the Italian novella; "devis" and "propos", a spoken discussion; "histoire", a story). For the period, part of the attraction of the dialogued short story and the frame tale (with its fictional speakers discussing each other's stories) lies in their "performability" by someone reading out loud to a non-literate public and in their grab-bag and (frequently) digressive structure: these tales are capable of taking on all kinds of material, both sophisticated and vulgar.

The Decameron, the short story collection by the Italian author Boccaccio, with its frame tale of nobles fleeing the plague and telling each other stories, had an enormous impact on French writers. The sister of Francis I, Marguerite of Navarre, who was the center of a progressive literary circle, undertook her own version (the Heptaméron) which, although incomplete, is one of the masterpieces of the century. Other important writers of short stories include Noël du Fail and Bonaventure des Périers. As the century progressed, the use of oral discourse, multiple voices and table talk led to a dialogued form which often seems revolutionary and chaotic to modern ears.

The French reading public was also fascinated by the dark tragic novellas ("histoires tragiques") of Bandello which were avidly adapted and emulated into the beginning of the seventeenth century (Jacques Yver, Vérité Habanc, Bénigne Poissenot, François de Rosset, Jean-Pierre Camus).

Short story collections in France in the Renaissance:

- Anon. Cent nouvelles nouvelles (1462)
- Philippe de Vigneulles Nouvelles (c. 1515) - most are lost
- Anon. Le Paragon des nouvelles honnestes et délectables (1531)
- Nicolas de Troyes Le grand paragon des nouvelles nouvelles (c1533-37)
- Bonaventure des Périers Cymbalum mundi (1537)
- Giovanni Boccaccio Le Décaméron - Antoine Le Maçon, translator (1545)
- Noël du Fail Propos rustiques de maistre Léon Ladulfi (1547)
- Noël du Fail Les Baliverneries ou contes nouveaux d'Eutrapel (1548)
- La Motte-Roullant 'Les fascetieux devitz des cent nouvelles nouvelles, tres recreatives et fort exemplaires... (1549) - (109 tales, mostly versions of Cent nouvelles nouvelles)
- Bonaventure des Périers Les Nouvelles récréations et Joyeux devis (90 tales) (1558)
- Pierre Boaistuau, ed. Histoires des Amans fortunez (1558) - truncated version of l'Heptaméron (67 tales) without dialogues between the stories
- Marguerite de Navarre L'Heptaméron Claude Gruget, ed. (1559)
- Pierre Boaistuau Histoires tragiques extraictes des oeuvres italiennes de Bandel.... (1559) - translation of Bandello.
- François de Belleforest Continuation des histoires tragiques, contenant douze histoires tirées de Bandel.... (1559) - translation of Bandello.
- Pierre Viret Le Monde à l'empire (date?) satirical pamphlet
- Pierre Viret Le Monde démoniacle (1561) satirical pamphlet
- François de Belleforest and Pierre Boaistuau Histoires tragiques - 7 vols. Belleforest's continuation of the translation of Bandello, published with Boaistuau's (1566–1583)
- Jacques Tahureau Les dialogues, Non moins profitables que facetieux (1565)
- Henri Estienne Apologie pour Hérodote (1566) (includes 180 tales)
- Estienne Tabourot des Accords Les Bigarrures (1572)
- Jean Bergier Discours modernes et facecieux (1572) - (13 tales)
- Jacques Yver Le Printemps d'Yver, contenant plusieurs histories discourues en cinq journées (1572)
- Duroc Sort-Manne (pseudo. for Romannet Du Cros) Nouveaux recits ou comptes moralisez (1573)
- Jeanne Flore Comptes amoureux (1574) (7 tales)
- Antoine Tyron Recueil de plusieurs plaisantes nouvelles, apaphthegmes et recreations diverses (1578)
- Bénigne Poissenot L'été (1583)
- Gabrielle Chappuys Cent excellentes nouvelles (1583) - translation of the Hecatommithi by Italian Giovanni Battista Giraldi (also known as Cintio)
- Gabrielle Chappuys Les facétieuses journées (1584) - translation of Italian tales
- Antoine du Verdier Le compseutique ou Traits facétieux (1584) - mostly lost
- Guillaume Bouchet Les sérées (1584, 97, 98)
- Estienne Tabourot des Accords Apophtegmes du Sieur Gaulard (1585)
- Noël Du Fail Les contes et discours d'Eutrapel (1585)
- De Cholières Les matinées (1585)
- Vérité Habanc Nouvelles histoires tant tragiques que comiques (1585).
- Bénigne Poissenot Nouvelles histoires tragiques (1586).
- De Cholières Les après-dînées (1587)
- Estienne Tabourot des Accords Les Escraignes dijonnaises (1588)

== Theatre ==
16th-century French theater followed the same patterns of evolution as the other literary genres of the period.

For the first decades of the century, public theater remained largely tied to its long medieval heritage of mystery plays, morality plays, farces, and soties, although the miracle play was no longer in vogue. Public performances were tightly controlled by a guild system. The guild "les Confrères de la Passion" had exclusive rights to theatrical productions of mystery plays in Paris; in 1548, fear of violence or blasphemy resulting from the growing religious rift in France forced the Paris Parliament to prohibit performances of the mysteries in the capital, although they continued to be performed in other places. Another guild, the "Enfants Sans-Souci" were in charge of farces and soties, as too the "Clercs de la Basoche" who also performed morality plays. Like the "Confrères de la Passion", "la Basoche" came under political scrutiny (plays had to be authorized by a review board; masks or characters depicting living persons were not permitted), and they were finally suppressed in 1582. By the end of the century, only the "Confrères de la Passion" remained with exclusive control over public theatrical productions in Paris, and they rented out their theater at the Hôtel de Bourgogne to theatrical troupes for a high price. In 1599, they abandoned this privilege.

It is of note that, alongside the numerous writers of these traditional works (such as the farce writers Pierre Gringore, Nicolas de La Chesnaye and André de la Vigne), Marguerite of Navarre also wrote a number of plays close to the traditional mystery and morality play.

As early as 1503 however, original language versions of Sophocles, Seneca, Euripides, Aristophanes, Terence and Plautus were all available in Europe and the next forty years would see humanists and poets both translating these classics and adapting them. In the 1540s, the French university setting (and especially — from 1553 on — the Jesuit colleges) became host to a Neo-Latin theater (in Latin) written by professors such as George Buchanan and Marc Antoine Muret which would leave a profound mark on the members of La Pléiade. From 1550 on, one finds humanist theater written in French.

The influence of Seneca was particularly strong in humanist tragedy. His plays — which were essentially chamber plays meant to be read for their lyrical passages and rhetorical oratory — brought to many humanist tragedies a concentration on rhetoric and language over dramatic action.

Humanist tragedy took two distinct directions:

- Biblical tragedy : plots taken from the bible — although close in inspiration to the medieval mystery plays, the humanist biblical tragedy reconceived the biblical characters along classical lines, suppressing both comic elements and the presence of God on the stage. The plots often had clear parallels to contemporary political and religious matters and one finds both Protestant and Catholic playwrights.
- Ancient tragedy : plots taken from mythology or history — they often had clear parallels to contemporary political and religious matters

During the height of the civil wars (1570–1580), a third category of militant theater appeared:

- Contemporary tragedy : plots taken from recent events

Along with their work as translators and adaptors of plays, the humanists also investigated classical theories of dramatic structure, plot, and characterization. Horace was translated in the 1540s, but had been available throughout the Middle Ages. A complete version of Aristotle's Poetics appeared later (first in 1570 in an Italian version), but his ideas had circulated (in an extremely truncated form) as early as the 13th century in Hermann the German's Latin translation of Averroes' Arabic gloss, and other translations of the Poetics had appeared in the first half of the 16th century; also of importance were the commentaries on Aristotle's poetics by Julius Caesar Scaliger which appeared in the 1560s. The fourth century grammarians Diomedes and Aelius Donatus were also a source of classical theory. The 16th-century Italians played a central role in the publishing and interpretation of classical dramatic theory, and their works had a major effect on French theater. Lodovico Castelvetro's Aristote-based Art of Poetry (1570) was one of the first enunciations of the three unities; this work would inform Jean de la Taille's Art de la tragedie (1572). Italian theater (like the tragedy of Gian Giorgio Trissino) and debates on decorum (like those provoked by Sperone Speroni's play Canace and Giovanni Battista Giraldi's play Orbecche) would also influence the French tradition.

In the same spirit of imitation — and adaptation — of classical sources that had informed the poetic compositions of La Pléiade, French humanist writers recommended that tragedy should be in five acts and have three main characters of noble rank; the play should begin in the middle of the action (in medias res), use noble language and not show scenes of horror on the stage. Some writers (like Lazare de Baïf and Thomas Sébillet) attempted to link the medieval tradition of morality plays and farces to classical theater, but Joachim du Bellay rejected this claim and elevated classical tragedy and comedy to a higher dignity. Of greater difficulty for the theorists was the incorporation of Aristotle's notion of "catharsis" or the purgation of emotions with Renaissance theater, which remained profoundly attached to both pleasing the audience and to the rhetorical aim of showing moral examples (exemplum).

Étienne Jodelle's Cléopâtre captive (1553) — which tells the impassioned fears and doubts of Cleopatra contemplating suicide — has the distinction of being the first original French play to follow Horace's classical precepts on structure (the play is in five acts and respects more or less the unities of time, place and action) and is extremely close to the ancient model: the prologue is introduced by a shade, there is a classical chorus which comments on the action and talks directly to the characters, and the tragic ending is described by a messenger.

Mellin de Saint-Gelais's translation of Gian Giorgio Trissino's La Sophonisbe — the first modern regular tragedy based on ancient models which tells the story of the noble Sophonisba's suicide (rather than be taken as captive by Rome) — was an enormous success at the court when performed in 1556.

Select list of authors and works of humanist tragedy:

- Théodore de Bèze
  - Abraham sacrifiant (1550)
- Étienne Jodelle
  - Cléopâtre captive (1553)
  - Didon se sacrifiant (date unknown)
- Mellin de Saint-Gelais
  - La Sophonisbe (performed 1556) - translation of the Italian play (1524) by Gian Giorgio Trissino
- Jacques Grévin
  - Jules César (1560) - imitated from the Latin of Marc Antoine Muret
- Jean de la Taille
  - Saül, le furieux (1563–1572)
- Guillaume Le Breton
  - Adonis (1569)
- Robert Garnier
  - Porcie (published 1568, acted in 1573),
  - Cornélie (acted in 1573 and published in 1574)
  - Hippolyte (acted in 1573 and published in 1574)
  - Marc-Antoine (1578)
  - La Troade (1579)
  - Antigone (1580)
  - Les Juives (1583)
- Pierre Matthieu (1563–1621)
  - Clytemnestre (1578)
  - Esther (1581)
  - Vashti (1589)
  - Aman, de la perfidie (1589)
  - La Guisiade (1589)
- Nicolas de Montreux
  - Tragédie du jeune Cyrus (1581)
  - Isabelle (1594)
  - Cléopâtre (1594)
  - Sophonisbe (1601)

(See the playwrights Antoine de Montchrestien, Alexandre Hardy and Jean de Schelandre for tragedy around 1600-1610.)

Alongside tragedy, European humanists also adapted the ancient comedic tradition and as early as the 15th century, Renaissance Italy had developed a form of humanist Latin comedy. Although the ancients had been less theoretical about the comedic form, the humanists used the precepts of Aelius Donatus (4th century A.D.), Horace, Aristotle and the works of Terence to elaborate a set of rules: comedy should seek to correct vice by showing the truth; there should be a happy ending; comedy uses a lower style of language than tragedy; comedy does not paint the great events of states and leaders, but the private lives of people, and its principal subject is love.

Although some French authors kept close to the ancient models (Pierre de Ronsard translated a part of Aristophanes's "Plutus" at college), on the whole the French comedic tradition shows a great deal of borrowing from all sources: medieval farce (which continued to be immensely popular throughout the century), the short story, Italian humanist comedies and "La Celestina" (by Fernando de Rojas). The most prolific of the French Renaissance comedic authors, Pierre de Larivey, adapted Italian comedies of intrigue by the authors Ludovico Dolce, Niccolò Buonaparte, Lorenzino de' Medici, Antonio Francesco Grazzini, Vincenzo Gabbiani, Girolano Razzi, Luigi Pasqualigo, and Nicolὸ Secchi.

Select list of authors and works of Renaissance comedy:

- Étienne Jodelle
  - L'Eugène (1552) – a comedy in five acts
- Jacques Grévin
  - Les Ébahis (1560)
- Jean Antoine de Baïf
  - L'Eunuque (1565), a version of Terence's Eunuchus
  - Le Brave (1567) – a version of Plautus's Miles gloriosus
- Jean de la Taille
  - Les Corrivaus (published in 1573) – an imitation of Boccaccio and other Italians
- Pierre de Larivey – Larivey was an important adapter of the Italian comedy
  - Le Laquais (1579)
  - La Vefve (1579)
  - Les Esprits (1579)
  - Le Morfondu (1579)
  - Les Jaloux (1579)
  - Les Escolliers (1579)
- Odet de Turnèbe
  - Les Contents (1581)
- Nicolas de Montreux
  - La Joyeuse (1581)
  - Joseph le Chaste (?)
- François d'Amboise (1550–1619)
  - Les Néapolitaines (1584)

In the last decades of the century, four other theatrical modes from Italy — which did not follow the rigid rules of classical theater – flooded the French stage:

- the Commedia dell'arte — an improvisational theater of fixed types (Harlequin, Colombo) created in Padua in 1545; Italian troupes were invited in France from 1576 on.
- the Tragicomedy — a theatrical version of the adventurous novel, with lovers, knights, disguises and magic. The most famous of these is Robert Garnier's Bradamante (1580), adapted from Ariosto's Orlando furioso.
- the Pastoral — modeled on Giambattista Guarini's "Pastor fido" ("Faithful Shepard"), Tasso's "Aminta" and Antonio Ongaro "Alceo" (themselves inspired by Jacopo Sannazaro and Jorge de Montemayor). The first French pastorals were short plays performed before a tragedy, but were eventually expanded into five acts. Nicolas de Montreux wrote three pastorals: Athlette (1585), Diane (1592) Arimène ou le berger désespéré (1597).
- the Ballet de cour — an allegorical and fantastic mixture of dance and theater. The most famous of these is the "Ballet comique de la reine" (1581).

By the end of the century, the most influential French playwright — by the range of his styles and by his mastery of the new forms — would be Robert Garnier.

All of these eclectic traditions would continue to evolve in the "baroque" theater of the early 17th century, before French "classicism" would finally impose itself.

== Other literary forms ==
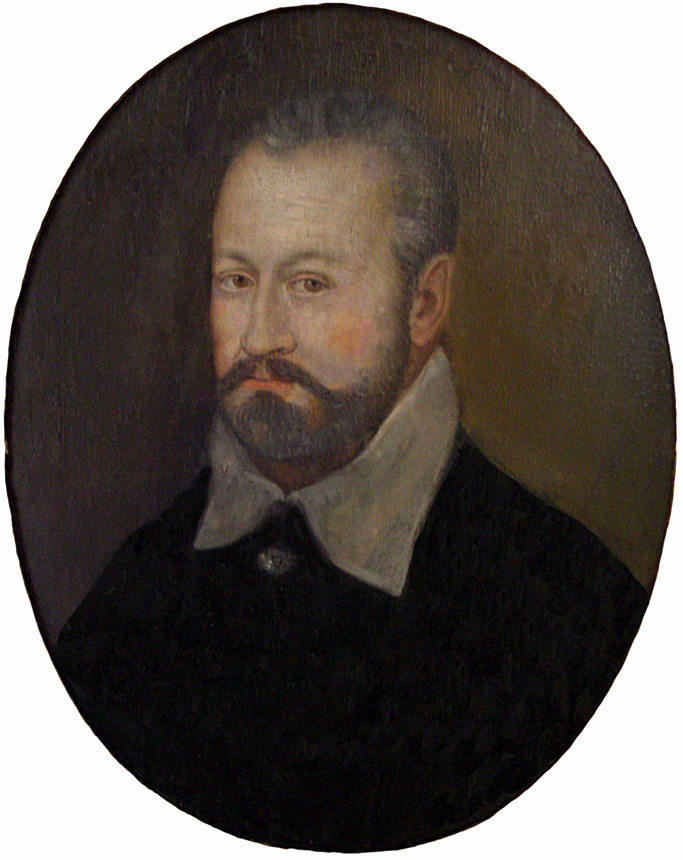
Michel de Montaigne

The French Renaissance was rich in a whole body of moral, literary, philological and philosophical writing. Michel de Montaigne was the first essayist of modern times (The Essays) and a remarkable writer on the human condition. Étienne Pasquier's Recherches de la France was another monumental compendium of historical, political and cultural observations.

Pierre de Bourdeille, seigneur de Brantôme wrote biographical sketches of the men and women of the court.

Jean Bodin wrote a number of important works on political science.

Henri Estienne and his son Robert Estienne were among the most important printers in France in the 16th century, and Robert Estienne's edition of the Bible was the first to use chapter and verse divisions.

The Catholic/Huguenot and civil/political conflicts of the last half of the century—the French Wars of Religion—generated a great deal of political, religious and satirical writing, including the Monarchomachs' libels.

The Satire Ménippée (1593/1594) written by Nicolas Rapin, Jean Passerat and Florent Chrestien, and edited/revised by Pierre Pithou was a political and satirical work in prose and verse which criticized the excesses of the Catholic League during the Wars of Religion.

== See also ==
- Renaissance
- History of France
- Early Modern France
- French Renaissance
