= Alfonso de Ulloa =

Alfonso de Ulloa (1529 – 1570) was a Spaniard living in Venice, who published and translated works from Spanish to Italian. He is best known for printing an Italian translation of the now lost biography of Christopher Columbus, written originally in Spanish by his son Ferdinand Columbus.

== Biography ==
Alfonso was born in Cáceres, region of Extremadura, Spain. His family derived from Galicia. Alfonso was educated in Toledo. His father had putatively fought for Emperor Charles V in the 1541 expedition to Algiers, and died circa 1540 in a voyage of exploration of the American Pacific. In 1546, Alfonso moved to Venice, where he found employment under Diego Hurtado de Mendoza, the imperial ambassador to Venice. In that service, it is almost certain that Alfonso would have had contact with Mendoza's librarian, Arnoldus Arlenius, who also worked at translating Ancient Greco-Roman classics.

However, he was accused by an imperial captain and aides in the service of Mendoza of serving in Venice as a spy for the French. He fled Venice and served circa 1551 as a mercenary to Ferrante I Gonzaga. However, by 1552 he was likely back in Venice mainly working on translations from Spanish to Italian. In 1552, the Gioliti firm published a translation by Ulloa into Spanish of Girolamo Muzio's Il Duello (The Duel). For the same firm, he published translations into Italian of the texts of La Celestina, La cárcel de Amor by Diego de San Pedro, poetry by Garcilaso de la Vega, and La Diana by Jorge de Montemayor.

Most of his works were eulogies of contemporary Imperial paladins and campaigns. In 1558, just months after the death of Charles V, he published a biography of the emperor. He initially worked mainly for the printing house of Gabriele Giolito, but after 1556, he also worked with other firms.

He was imprisoned in 1567 in Venice, putatively for falsifying an official permission from the Council of Ten allowing him to publish a book in Hebrew. However, there is evidence that he was not protected, but may have been further impugned by the Spanish ambassador to Venice. Condemned to death, his sentence was commuted to life imprisonment. He died in jail in 1570.

== Works ==
- Spanish Texts
  - Tragicomedia de Calisto y Melibea (1553) (A version of La Celestina
  - La cárcel de amor by Diego de San Pedro (1553)
  - Poetry of Garcilaso de la Vega, originally edited by Juan Boscan (1553)
  - El Orlando Furioso by Ariosto (1553)
  - Works by Petraca (1567)
  - La Diana by Jorge de Montemayor (1568
  - El Sucesso de la Jornada ... en los Gelves (events at Battle of Djerba) (1562)
  - Comentarios del la querra que Don Hernando Alvarez de Toledo ...
- Italian Texts
  - Novelle by Matteo Bandello
- Translations of Italian texts into Spanish
  - El Duello by Muzio
  - Exposition of all the difficult places by Ludovico Dolce
  - Gathered sentences and maxims of Greek and Latin authors by Niccolò Liburnio (1553)
  - Dialogo de las empresas militares y amorosas by Paulo Jovio (1558)
  - Vidas de Carlos V
  - Vidas de Ferrante Gonzaga
  - Vidas de Ferdinando Primer
  - Vidas de Europa
  - Orlando Furioso translation by Jerónimo de Urrea edited by Ulloa (1553)
  - Questión de amor de dos enamorados(1553)
- Translations from Spanish to Italian
  - Works of Antonio de Guevara
  - History of the Turks by Vasco Diaz Tanco
  - Historia de Zighet, ispugnata da Suliman, rey de los Turcos, (regarding Siege of Szigetvár)
  - Silva de varia lección de Pedro Mejía (1553)

Vita dell'Ammiraglio (1571) (Biography of Christopher Columbus derived from his son's biography)

- Translation from Portuguese in Italia
  - Decades of Asia by João de Barros
  - History of the Oriental Indies by Fernão Lopes de Castanheda
- Attributed
  - Breve introducción para saber pronunciar la lengua castellana. by Francisco Delicado

== Bibliography ==
- Bellomi, Paola (2015). "Alfonso de Ulloa". Christian-Muslim Relations 1500 - 1900. Brill Reference Online.
- Solís de los Santos, José. "Alfonso de Ulloa". Real Academia de la Historia (in Spanish).
- Arróniz, O. (1968). Bulletin hispanique (ed.). Alfonso de Ulloa, servidor de don Juan Hurtado de Mendoza.
- Carpi, E. (2007). Università degli studi di Pisa (ed.). Aspectos lingüísticos de la traducción italiana de la Instrución de Mercaderes de Saravia de la Calle.
- Gallina, A. (1975). Ateneo Veneto XIII (ed.). Prime grammatiche spagnole ad uso degli italiani (sec. XVI).
