= Bénigne Poissenot =

French writer

Bénigne Poissenot (c.1550 – after 1586) was a French writer of the Renaissance, known for two collections of short stories.

== Biography ==
He was born in Langres. Few details are known of his life.

== Works ==
- L'Esté contenant trois journées ou sont deduictes plusieurs histoires et propos recréantifs tenus par trois écoliers (Summer, containing three days during which are narrated several stories and amusing anecdotes told by three students) (Paris, 1583): a frame tale (as used in Boccaccio's Decameron and Marguerite de Navarre's Heptaméron) narrating several stories and anecdotes by three wandering students.
- Nouvelles histoires tragiques (Paris, 1586): a collection of tragic stories in the vogue of the tragic tales of Bandello (as translated by François de Belleforest and Pierre Boaistuau) and other "histoires tragiques" in the period.
- a Latin translation of Pierre Boaistuau's Bref Discours.
