= Tabourot =

Tabourot is a surname. Notable people with the surname include:

- Étienne Tabourot (1549–1590), French jurist, writer and poet
- Jehan Tabourot, birth name of Thoinot Arbeau (1519–1595), French cleric and writer

== See also ==
- Taboret, type of furniture
