= Nicolas Denisot =

French poet and painter (1515–1559)

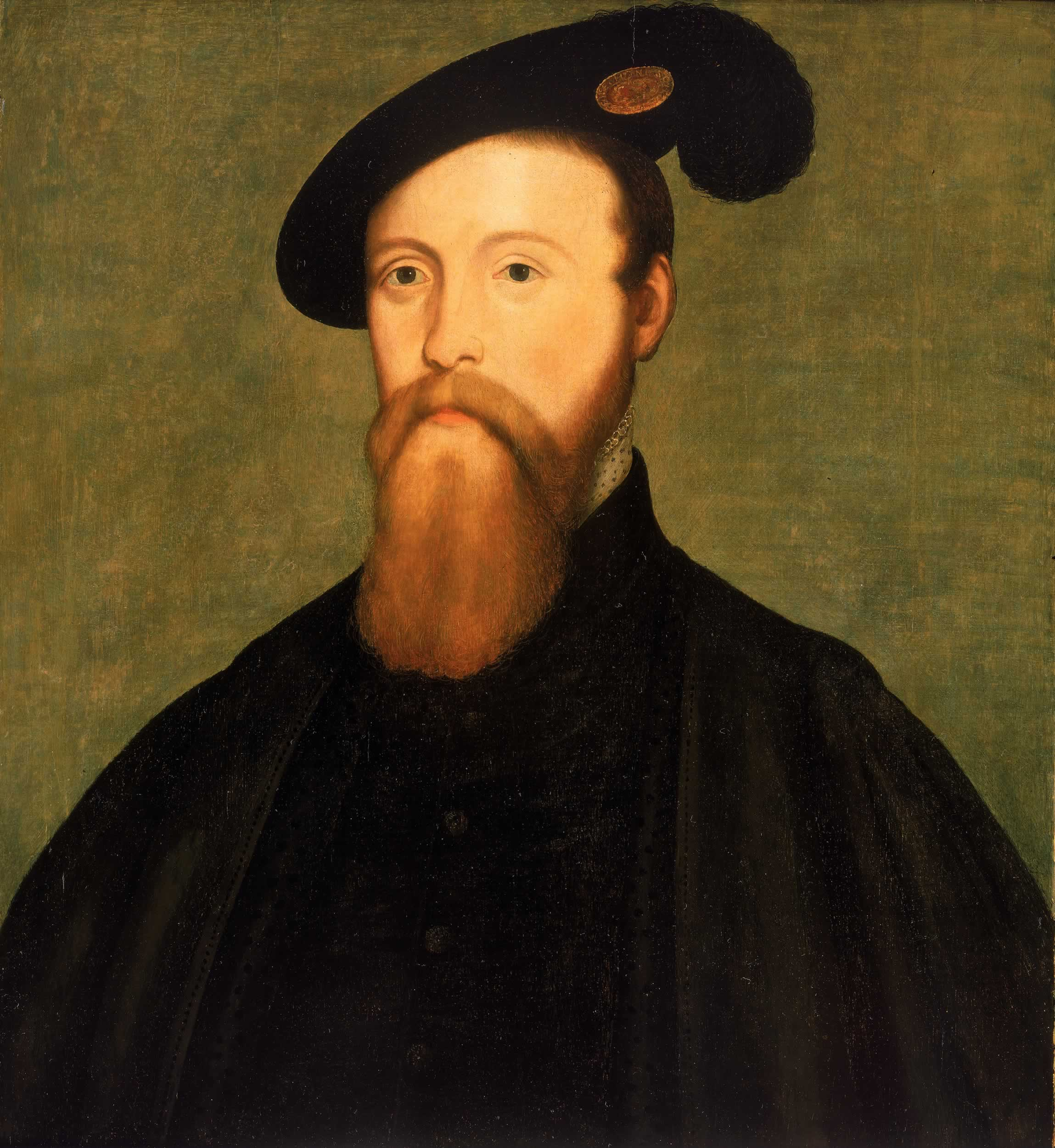
Thomas Seymour, 1st Baron Seymour of Sudeley by Nicolas Denisot, National Maritime Museum collection, between 1545 and 1549

Nicolas Denisot, also Nicholas Denizot, (1515–1559) was a French Renaissance poet and painter.

== Family ==
Denisot was born in Le Mans where his family, described as an "ancient and illustrious family of Perche" fixed a long time in Nogent-le-Rotrou, lived. They were noble and wore "three ears of corn in a field of blue". His father Jehan Denisot the Elder was a lawyer. Jehan's eldest son John was born with his first wife Simone Moreau who died soon after. Nicolas was the product of his father's second marriage. His older brother Francis, born of the second marriage and the eldest of Nicolas, joined the church. Francis practiced poetry as a hobby, and later became abbot of La Perine and then Prior at Asse-le-Riboul.

Noelz collection of Christmas poems by Nicolas Denisot, copy published in 1847

== Early career ==
Denisot's studies were rather poor where he studied in school run by monks. He did have the opportunity to become friends with the poet Jacques Pelletier du Mans. Then he probably went to college Saint-Benoît. The college was located in the Saint-Pavin-de-Ia-Cité where Denisot remained. There he met and became friends with the writer Jacques Tahureau. Denisot followed in the footsteps of his father, made a career as a lawyer and was later appointed Attorney in Le Mans.

== Works ==
He published a Christmas poem collection in December 1545, preceding those of Barthélemy Aneau, under a pseudonym "Count of Alsinois". He then went on to produce numerous writings and poetry using this alternate identity, as well as occasionally painting portraits. His writing brought him into a network of friends and contacts included many well-known French literati of his time, such as François de Belleforest, Joseph Scaliger, Bernard de Girard, Pierre Boaistuau, Jean-Antoine de Baïf, Claude Roillet, and Jacques Grévin. One painting executed by Denisot Thomas Seymour, 1st Baron Seymour of Sudeley is part of the National Maritime Museum collection.
