= Jacques Yver =

French Renaissance writer

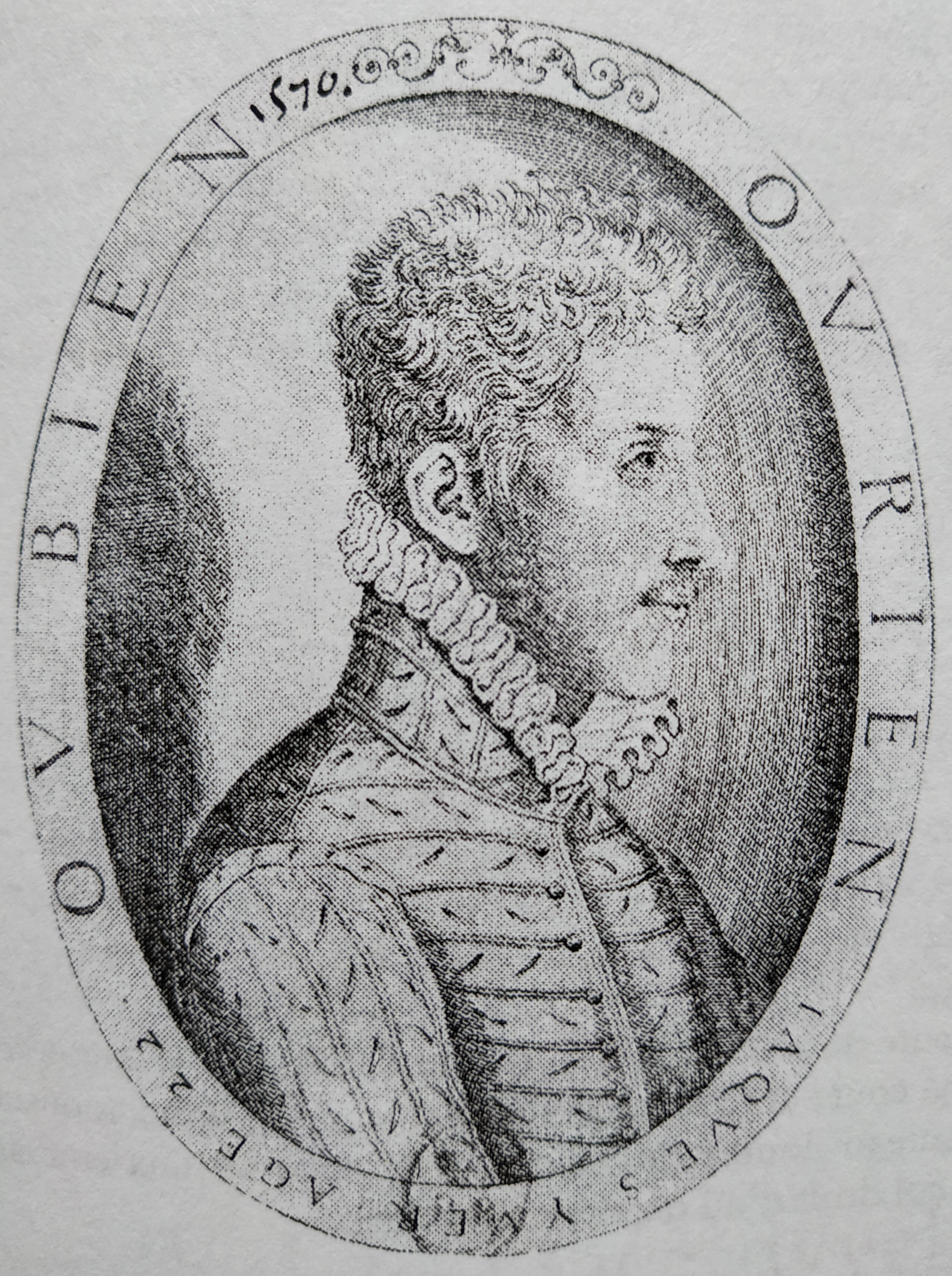
Engraving by Jacques YVER writer (1520-1572) dated 1570.

Jacques Yver, seigneur de la Bigoterie and de Plaisance (c.1548 – 1571/72) was a French writer of the Renaissance. His posthumous collection of tales mixed with verse, Le Printemps, enjoyed an important publishing success, with 33 editions published from 1572 to 1635.

== Biography ==
Yver was born in Niort. His titles come from two small fiefs on the Sèvre river, near Niort. He went to school in Poitiers where he studied law and frequented the literary circles of the day. After trips to Italy and, perhaps, to the Rhine region, he returned home to find the region torn by the French Wars of Religion and appears to have joined the party of the "politiques".

He appears to have been inspired by the translations of the stories of Matteo Bandello made by François de Belleforest to write his own work.

== Le Printemps ==
The full title of his short story collection is Le Printemps d'Yver, contenant plusieurs histoires discourues en cinq journées (English: The Spring of Yver or, of Winter, as Yver could also refer to hiver) containing several stories told over five days. (Published in Paris and Antwerp, 1572).

The work follows the frame tale technique made famous by Boccaccio's Decameron and Marguerite de Navarre's Heptaméron: in a castle in Saintonge, a group of gentlemen and ladies (presented as real people, albeit under assumed names) gather together and tell each other five stories followed by debates on love. Each speaker maintains a different thesis on the nature of love and the culpability of the sexes.

Four of the tales are tragic in nature (similar to the tales of Bandello and other "histoires tragiques" popular in the period):

- Eraste et Perside
- Guillaume le Bâtard
- Fleurie et Hermann
- Clarinde et Alègre

The fifth tale is lighter in tone:

- Claribel et Floradin

The work also includes verse passages, including Complaincte sur les misères de la guerre civile (Complaint on the Miseries of the Civil War).
