= Histoires tragiques =

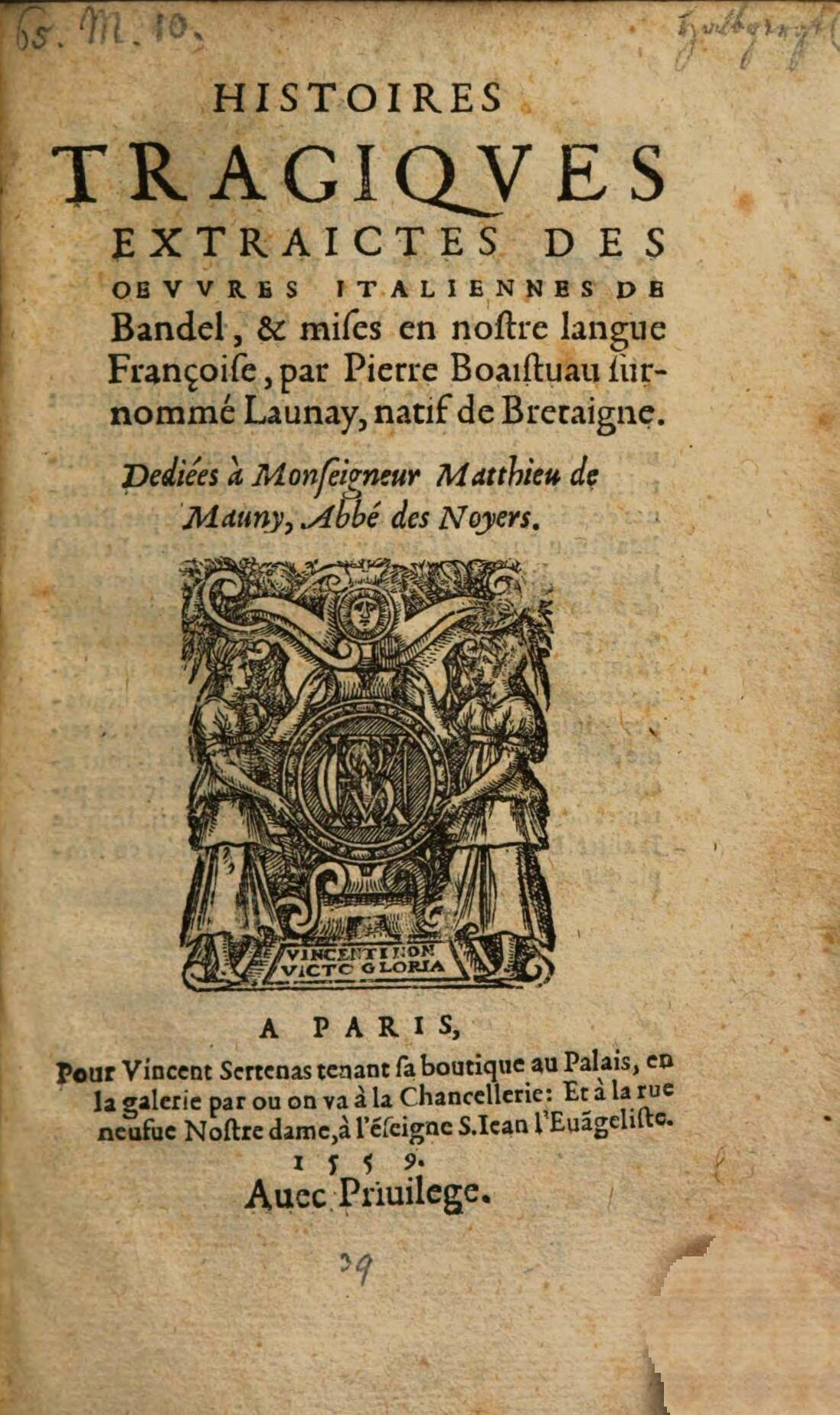
Title page of the 1559 first edition of Pierre Boaistuau's Histoires tragiques

Histoires tragiques ('tragic stories') were a genre of French fiction in 16th-17th centuries, a Baroque rendering of Boccaccio's type of short stories, concentrating on the dark side of human nature.

The progenitor of this kind of a story was Pierre Boaistuau with his translation of Matteo Bandello's Novelli published in French as Histoires tragiques (1559). Boaistuau selected from Bandello six most dark and gorey stories and changed them for his means. He was followed by François de Belleforest who adapted 12 more stories for the new edition in 1570.

Those dark mood stories were imitated by writers like Jacques Yver (Le Printemps d’Yver, 1572), Vérité Habanc (Nouvelles Histoires tant tragiques que comiques, 1585), Bénigne Poissenot (Nouvelles Histoires Tragiques, 1586), Alexandre Sylvain (Epitomes de cent histoires tragicques, 1581), and Bruneau de Rivedoux (Histoire véritable de certains voyages périlleux et hasardeux sur la mer, 1599).

François de Rosset began to borrow plots for his tragic stories from contemporary crime chronicle (Les Histoires tragiques de nostre temps, 1615), and this innovation proved to be extremely popular.

Another important author is Jean-Pierre Camus who adds infernal and diabolical themes.

== Literature ==
- Poli, Sergio. Histoire(s) tragique(s) : anthologie-typologie d'un genre littéraire. Fasano, Schena, 1991. 520 p.
- Ferrari, Stéphan. Histoire tragique et grande histoire : Rencontre de deux genres. Dalhousie French Studies, Winter 2003, 65, p. 18-35.
