= Mortal wound =

Injury that will ultimately lead to a person's death

"Mortal Wound" dictionary entry from The New World of English Words By Edward Phillips (1720).

A mortal wound is an injury that will ultimately lead to a person's death. Mortal refers to the mortality of a human: whether they are going to live or die. Wound is another term for injury. The expression can also be used figuratively.

== Etymology ==
The adjective mortal was first used in the 14th century. The word has roots in Old French mortel and Latin mortalis both meaning "fated to die" as well as mors meaning "in danger of death".

The noun wound comes from Old English wund meaning "to injure" as well as the Proto-Germanic *wuntho which also means "wound".

== Early usage ==
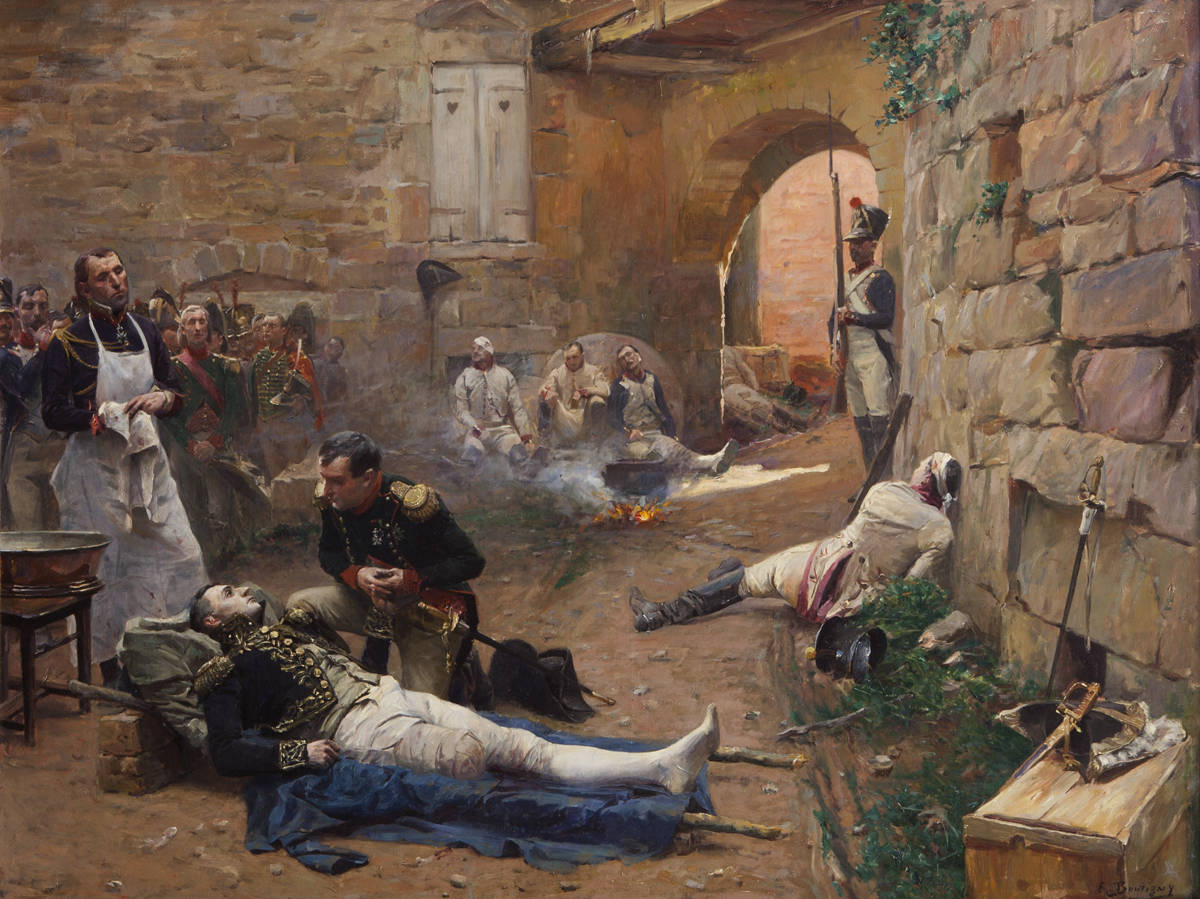
Marshal Jean Lannes, mortally wounded at the battle of Essling in 1809; his left leg was amputated (right in picture) and he died a few days later.

The first entry in the Oxford English Dictionary for mortal wound is dated 1578 and the first entry for mortally wounded is dated 1569. Pre-1569, in the 1390 Melibeus by Geoffrey Chaucer, the author uses the term "mortal woundes" in the quote "Thre of his olde foos..betten his wif wounded his doghter with fyue mortal woundes". This is in a scene where Melibeus's daughter received five mortal wounds, after three of his foes found Melibeus's wife and daughter alone in his house.

=== 1500s ===
In 1569, mortally wounded was used in the text Certaine Secrete Wonders Nature by Edward Fenton in "aboue 400 dead bodies, beside 140 mortally wounded and almost torne in peces"; the quote explains that due to the extreme heat of a fire, 140 men were wounded. The account stated that they looked like they had been torn to pieces.

In 1578, mortal wound was used in the poetic text Courtlie Controuersie of Cupids Caulels by Jacques Yver, translated by Henry Wotton: "His mortal wound, that no long before was almost cured y a fomentation of the oyle of time, and neare skinned with hope of the recouerie of his welbeloued Iewel." The author describes how the person's old mortal wound was not yet healed and hoped he would recover completely.

In 1581, mortal wound was used in the historical non-fiction History of the Reformation of the Church of England by Gilbert Burnet and Nicholas Sander: "He went to Rome; and giving the Assault, in which received his mortal wound." Here Vaudemont went to subdue the battle but was prevented by the Duke of Boubon receiving a mortal wound. The Duke of Boubon then proceeded with the battle in Rome, causing many deaths as well as leading the Pope with a few Cardinals to flee for safety.

In 1593, mortal wound was used in the sonnet Fidessa, More Chaste than Kind: Sonnet XXVII in "Yet every foot gives thee thy mortal wound." The quote is from a sonnet that describes a man stumbling in the street at night as he metaphorically compares his existence to that of a worm. Due to the habitat of worms, every step a person takes could be a mortal wound inflicted on a worm ultimately leading to its death. In the sonnet, the man believes that his existence is worse than that of a worm.

=== 1600s ===
In 1661 mortal wound is used in the religious text The Unsearchable Riches of Christ: "The Lord Jesus hath given such a mortal wound by his death and Spirit." The text explains how Jesus sacrificed himself and received a mortal wound; however, he did not die straight away but died "little by little", which allowed him to rid the whole world of sin.

In 1667 mortal wound is used in John Milton's Paradise Lost VI. In his epic biblical poem based on the retelling of Genesis, he uses the term in the passage "cannot but by annihilating die; Nor in their liquid texture mortal wound Receive, no more than can the fluid air." Milton explains spirits cannot receive mortal wounds due to the nature of their intangible form.

In 1672 the term mortal wound is used in the medical text The Chirurgical and Anatomical Works of Paul Barbette. The text defines the term as "that, which in the Space of few hours, or dayes, of necessity causes Death, and cannot by any Artt be Cured." The text goes on to explain that if a wound is curable but has been neglected by the patient and results in death, it is not considered a mortal wound even though it resulted in the patient's death. This also applies to wounds that are incurable and allow the patient to live for weeks to years. Therefore, the author explains that if the wound does not result in a "sudden" death, it is not considered a "mortal wound."

=== 1700s ===
The London Gazette is one of the British government's official journals. In the 1714 The London Gazette: Issue 5228, under the Advertisements section, mortal wound is used to describe an injury a man named Edward Hurley received from a Two-Bill. "Whereas one Henry Bray, Weaver, now or late of Culmstock, in the County of Devon, did on Tuesday the 18th Instant, give one Edward Hurley … a mortal Wound on the Head with a Two-Bill, that he dy’d." The journal goes on to describe Henry Bray's appearance, mannerisms and the clothes he usually wears as well as stating that anyone that helps bring him to justice will receive a monetary reward.

The first dictionary with an entry for the term is Edward Phillips' The New World of Words: or, Universal English Dictionary, 16th edition, published in 1720. The entry says "Mortal Wound. See Wound" At the entry for wound, the definition for mortal wound states "Mortal Wound, is that which must unavoidably be follow'd by Death, when it is situate deep in a principal Part, necessary for the Preservation of Life: Such are wounds in the Heart, Lungs, Midriff, Liver, Spleen Etc. and generally in all the great Vessels".

Poet Allan Ramsay wrote Health: a poem 1st edition in 1724, stating "When th’ uvula has got its mortal wound, and tongue and lips form words without a sound." He states that the uvula had received a mortal wound, using the term metaphorically to describe an uvula infection possibly due to influenza which often led to death in the 1700s.

In 1760 mortal wound is used in the Trial of Lawrence Earl Ferrers, for the Murder of John Johnson. John Johnson received "One mortal Wound of the ‘Breadth of One Inch and Depth of Four Inches; of which said mortal Wound the said John Johnson did ... live, until the Nineteenth Day of the same Month of January, ... on which Day, ... he the said John Johnson, of the mortal Wound aforesaid, died." During the trial, the jurors found Lawrence Earl Ferrers guilty of murder as he purposefully and without remorse injured John Johnson which led to his death.

Other examples of "mortal wound" are found in:

- The 1725 written account of The Last confession and Dying Words of John Gow,
- The 1767 non-fiction text A Practical Treatise on Wounds and Other Chirurgical Subjects by Benjamin Gooch,

=== 1800s ===
In the 1817 love poem Laon and Cythna by Percy Bysshe Shelley, he used mortal wound to describe "Upon his enemies heart a mortal wound to wreck," where a metaphorical eagle wished to give his enemy, a serpent, a mortal wound.

The 1838 romance novel Leila II. ii. by Edward Bulwer-Lytton uses mortal wound to depict a scene "while the blood oozes slow and gurgling from a mortal wound." This line occurs when a soldier wearing armour did not appear to have been wounded but blood was leaking from a serious wound he had sustained.

The 1865 text Camps and Prisons. Twenty Months in the Department of the Gulf by Augustine Joseph Hickey Duganne is a collection of personal accounts of the American Civil War. The term is used by the author when he exclaims "And the wide land with mortal wound outbleeds!" Duganne is describing the mass of men that are found seriously injured throughout the land he stands on.

=== 1900s ===
In the 1982 non-fiction Tortious Liability for Unintentional Harm in the Common Law and the Civil Law, the author discusses problems associated with liability in European Law. He uses the term mortal wound to discuss the issue of accountability regarding mortally wounding a slave. The author states "In the first, Celsus, Marcellus and Ulpian agree that if one man gives a slave a moral wound and another afterwards kills him, only the latter is liable under the first chapter for killing the former only under the third for wounding," while contrastingly he also explains "Julian… says... if one man gives a slave a mortal wound and after an interval another strikes him in a way as to hasten his death, both are liable for killing." The author explains that the juxtaposition is due to Julian focusing on the original wound being intentionally mortal, leading to the slave's death, while Celsus contradicts Julian and mainly focuses on the importance of the resulting death of the slave.

The religious text The Apocalypse: A Reading of the Revelation of John, published in 1994, uses the term mortal wound in reference to Revelation 13:3. The text describes a beast where "one of its heads seemed to have a mortal wound, but its wound was healed," The author explains that this section of Revelation 13 refers to the legend of Nero, Roman Emperor, ‘coming back to life’ or still being alive after receiving a mortal wound and his vengeful goal of leading the Parthian army to destroy Rome.

In the 1997 text Virgil's Aeneid: Semantic Relations and Proper Names the author reflects on Virgil's epic poem using mortal wound in "The mortal wound that Turnus inflicted on the youth made this wound an unhealable one." This describes a scene where Turnus and Aeneas are battling in Italy. Even though Aeneas is injured he returns to battle and "Aeneas inflicts the mortal wound on Turnus in the name of ‘Pallas’," where Aeneas takes vengeance for Turnus killing his friend Pallas.

Other examples of "mortal wound" are found in:

- The 1964 novel The Mortal Wound by Raffaele La Capria about a man's connection with Naples during his travels to Rome,
- The 1968 novel King, Queen, Knave by Vladimir Nabokov "he threatened her with a priapus that had already once inflicted upon her an almost mortal wound,"

== Modern usage ==
The number of Google search hits on 12 August 2006 for "mortally wounded" was 989,000. The number of Google hits on 12 October 2018 for "mortal wound" had 346,000 results and "mortally wounded" had 1,660,000 results.

More modern usage of the term is often more figurative than literal, which can be seen in the 1998 article Paternal Style Leaves Mortal Wounds by Stephen Deutsch. The article talks about the demise of a hospital without a director present and a proper mission statement which would lead to its implied 'eventual' death.

=== Legal usage ===
The term "mortal wound" may be defined by statute. For example, in New Zealand, the term is defined by the Crimes Act of 1961 as a dangerous act that is legally causative of death. In other contexts, the term may be used to indicate a wound that is nontrivial. More broadly, the term has been observed to be used with three possible meanings: (i) an injury that is likely to cause death to an average person under normal circumstances (ii) an injury that has a high likelihood of causing the victim death if left untreated medically; (iii) an injury that is likely to cause death even though it does not apply to the first two circumstances (e.g. a minor injury neglected by the victim).

In the 2007 Republic of Philippines Supreme Court Petition for Review of Lazaro (petitioner) versus Crisaldo Alberto (prosecutor) the decision report uses the term "mortal wound", it discusses the importance of being able to discern whether the petitioner had inflicted a mortal or non-mortal wound on the prosecutor Crisaldo in determining the sentence for Lazaro. If the Jury believed that Crisaldo had been inflicted with a mortal wound, which would have led to death if untreated, then Lazaro would be accused of attempted murder, rather than frustrated murder.

=== Usage in the media ===
The 2018 Australian news article Dutton delivers mortal wound to Turnbull uses the term metaphorically as the death of Prime Minister Turnbull's party's support. Member of parliament Petter Dutton challenged Prime Minister Malcolm Turnbull for leadership of the Australian Liberal Party. The article describes it as when fewer than 60% of a prime minister's colleagues support him, he is a "dead leader walking."
