= Matthieu Brouard =

French writer (1520–1576)

Matthieu Brouard was a French theologian, mathematician, philosopher and historian, who was born in Saint-Denis near Paris in 1520, and died in Geneva on July 15, 1576. He is also known as Matthieu Brouart or Béroalde and (in Latin) as Mattheus Beroaldus. He taught Greek to the young Thomas Bodley and was the father of François Béroalde de Verville.
