= Juan de Flores =

Spanish writer, courtier and diplomat (c. 1455 – c. 1525)

Juan de Flores (c. 1455 - c. 1525) was a Spanish courtier, knight, administrator, diplomat and author, most known for two "sentimental novels": Grimalte y Gradissa and Grisel y Mirabella, both probably written between 1470 and 1477 and published around 1495. Until recently, little was known of his life. Representative of a class of late medieval "humanist knights", he was associated with the court of García Álvarez de Toledo, 1st Duke of Alba and may have been the nephew of the noble Pedro Alvarez Osorio. In 1476, he was appointed official chronicler to the monarchs Fernando and Isabella; among his other political activities, he may have participated in the civil war of the 1470s and in Grenada. He was "one of the most widely read Spanish authors in Europe", unmatched until Miguel de Cervantes started writing 60 years after de Flores died, and the European popularity of his Grisel y Mirabella (which had at least 56 editions in several languages before Cervantes was born) was on a par with Diego de San Pedro's Cárcel de amor and Fernando de Rojas's La Celestina.

== Works ==
=== Grimalte y Gradissa ===
The work presents itself as a kind of sequel to Giovanni Boccaccio's Elegia di Madonna Fiammetta: a Spanish young lady, Gradissa, is heart-broken over the fate of Boccaccio's Lady Fiammetta (presented as a real person), and she decides to reject the advances of all men, including her noble lover Grimalte. This latter decides to search out Lady Fiammetta, and eventually discovers her. He attempts to reconcile Fiammetta and her lover Panfilo, but is unsuccessful. Fiammetta dies and Panfilo promises to retreat from the world and seek out the wilds of the forest. Grimalte returns to his love Gradissa to attempt his own reconciliation, but she convinces him to seek out Panfilo once more. Grimalte does this, finding Panfilo alone and silent in the forest, and in his turn Grimalte becomes a wild man of the woods, haunted by visions of Fiammetta in hell.

=== Grisel y Mirabella ===
The story is as follows:

The King of Scotland has a daughter, Mirabella (Isabella in other versions), whom he loves so much, that he rejects all suitors for her hand and locks her up in his palace. A young noble, Grisel (Aurelio in other versions) is, however, able to find his way to her and they fall in love. Denounced by a servant, they are both imprisoned, and the king decides to judge them according to a law dictating that the person found more culpable is to be put to death, while the other is to be exiled. When the lovers, under torture, each refuse to inculpate the other, the king decides to organize a judicial debate, the cause of women to be defended by a certain Braçayda (Hortensia in other versions), and the cause of men by a certain Torrellas (Afranio in other versions). After a lengthy debate, the judges find women to be more guilty, and Mirabella is sentenced to be burnt at the stake. As the bonfire is prepared, her lover Grisel throws himself in the fire and the public stops all further action, claiming God has chosen his victim. That night, however, Mirabella throws herself in her father's courtyard to be devoured by his lions. Finally: in an act of vengeance for the death of her daughter, the queen has a false letter sent to the vain Torrellas, the "champion of men", supposedly by the hand of Braçayda, proclaiming Braçayda's interest in him and inviting him to a secret rendez-vous. At this tryst, the queen and her maidens surprise the man, bind him, gruesomely torture him all night, and finally kill him.

The early portion of the story has similarities to a tale in Boccaccio's Decameron ("The story of Guiscardo and Ghismonda", day four, first tale), while the debate on love and a woman or man's guilt echoes a long tradition in late medieval and early Renaissance texts.

=== El Triunfo de Amor ===
Juan de Flores is also author of an allegorical vision story, El Triunfo de Amor (The Triumph of Love): Cupid is captured by angry dead lovers and, after a trial, is sentenced to death. He is, however, saved by his supporters, and in return Cupid reverses the roles of love in the sexes, making men virtuous and chaste and making women the ones imploring them for sex.

=== Other works ===
Three other works have been attributed to Juan de Flores with some certainty:

- an epistolary exchange between Tristan and Isolde;
- a royal chronicle, Crónica incompleta de los Reyes Católicos;
- La coronación de la señora Gracisla, a work on consolation relating the tale of a maiden at a beauty contest.

== Translations and influence ==
Grisel y Mirabella was translated into Italian (1521) as Historia de Aurelio et Isabel by a certain "Lelio Aletiphilo"; this translation gave the work a wide dissemination. Grisel y Mirabella was translated into French (1530) as Le Jugement d'Amour or as Histoire d'Aurelio et d'Isabelle.

De Flores's novel was popular in England, and had been published in English translation five times between 1556 and 1586. It was one of the sources for Women Pleased, a late Jacobean-era stage play, a tragicomedy, by John Fletcher (1647).

Grimalte y Gradissa was translated into French in 1535 by Maurice Scève as La Déplourable fin de Flamecte.

The influence of Grisel y Mirabella can be seen in Lope de Vega's work La Ley Ejecutada.

== See also ==
- Spanish Renaissance
- Spanish Renaissance literature
