= Elegia di Madonna Fiammetta =

1340s novel by Giovanni Boccaccio

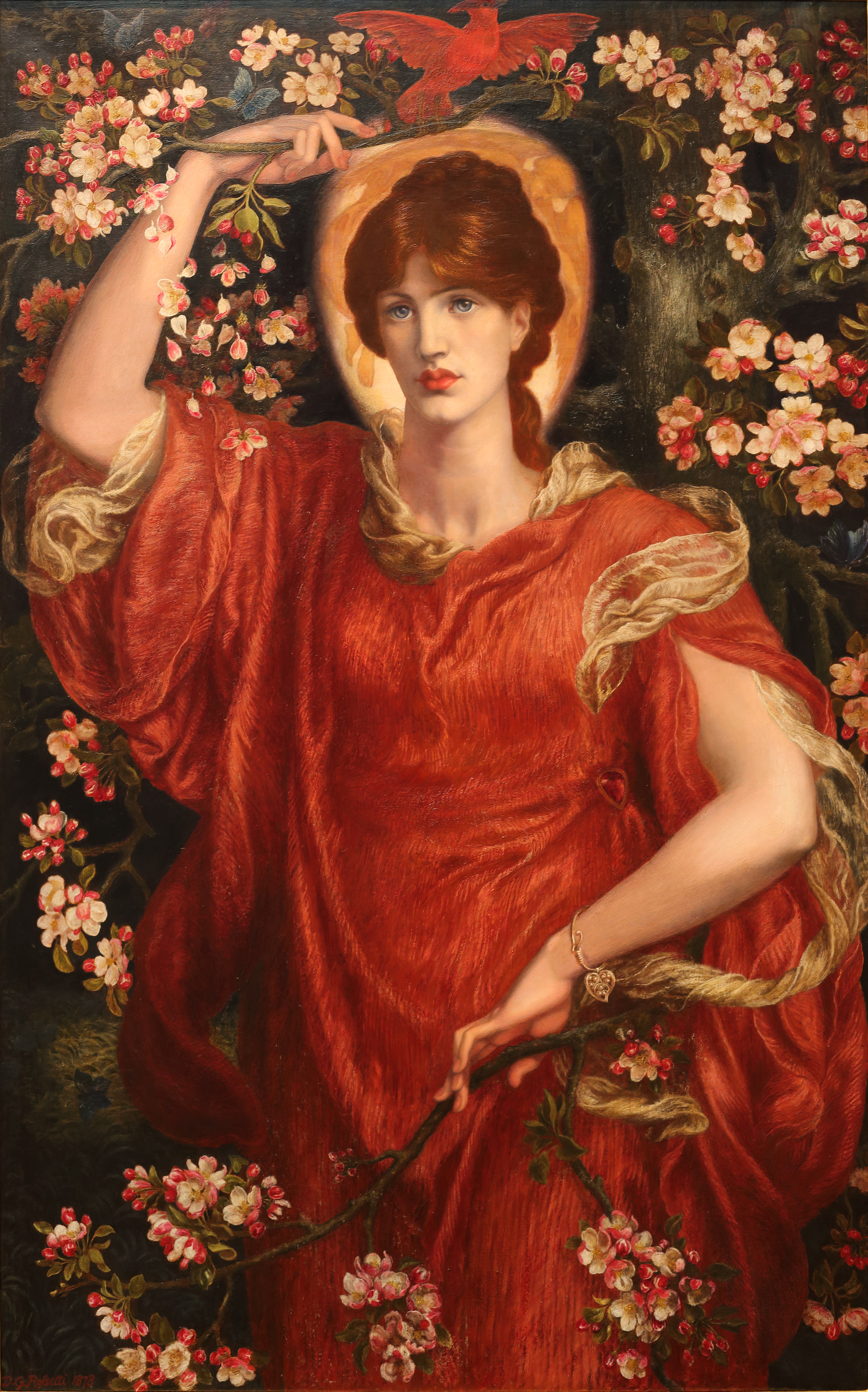
A Vision of Fiammetta by Dante Gabriel Rossetti

Elegia di Madonna Fiammetta, or The Elegy of Lady Fiammetta in English, is a novel by the Italian writer Giovanni Boccaccio, probably written between 1343 and 1344. Written in the form of a first-person confessional monologue, it describes the protagonist, Fiammetta's, passion for Panfilo, a Florentine merchant, and takes place in Naples. It has been characterised as the first psychological novel in Western literature. It consists of a prologue and nine chapters.

== Plot ==
Lady Fiammetta recounts her tragic love affair with Panfilo, offering it as a warning to other women. Lady Fiammetta and Panfilo quickly fall in love and have an affair, only to have it end when Panfilo returns to Florence.

Although he promises to return to Naples, she eventually realizes that he has another lover in Florence. The narrative revolves around Fiammetta's jealousy and despair caused by the affair, rather than the development of her relationship with Panfilo. She eventually considers suicide, but her nurse stops her. Her hopes in the end are bolstered by the news that Panfilo may be coming back to Naples after all.

== Translations ==
Two translations of Boccaccio's Elegia have come out in recent years. The two translations differ in their principles of translation and their Italian texts. The Elegy of Madonna Fiammetta Sent by Her to Women in Love, by Roberta L. Payne and Alexandra Hennessey Olsenhope, is aimed at a popular audience. The Mariangela Causa-Steindler and Thomas Mauch translation, The Elegy of Lady Fiammetta, is more scholarly.

== See also ==
- Juan de Flores wrote a sentimental novel, Grimalte y Gradissa, which presents itself as a kind of sequel to the Elegia di Madonna Fiammetta.

== Sources ==
- Causa-Steindler, Mariangela and Thomas Mauch (1990). The Elegy of Lady Fiammetta. University of Chicago Press. ISBN 9780226062761.
- Hennessey, Alexandra and Roberta L. Payne (1993). The Elegy of Madonna Fiammetta Sent by Her to Women in Love. Peter Lang Publishing. ISBN 9780820418377.
