= Nicolas de Montreux =

Nicolas de Montreux (c. 1561–1608) was a French nobleman, novelist, poet, translator, and dramatist.

Born in Sablé-sur-Sarthe, in the province of Maine, he was the son of a maître des requêtes and may have become a priest around 1585. In 1591 he came under the protection of the Duke of Mercœur (he became his librarian) and participated in the civil wars on the side of the Ligue, until he was imprisoned. Upon his release, he joined the court of Henry IV of France.

Montreux signed many of his works with the anagram "Ollénix du Mont Sacré".

== Works ==
Montreux's vast corpus spans theater, the novel, the pastoral, history, poetry and spiritual reflection and he shows a pronounced preoccupation with moral questions (such as chastity). With Béroalde de Verville, Montreux represents a literature of transition from the Valois court (and the generation of "La Pléiade") to the Bourbon court of Henry IV and the baroque, and both of these authors attempted to compete with the translation of foreign masterpieces by the creation of original works in French.

Montreux's first work was published at the age of 16 (a French adaptation from Italian of the 16th volume of Amadis of Gaul, 1577).

His most famous work is an immense pastoral novel/play the Bergeries de Julliette in five volumes (1585–1598) (inspired by the Diane of Jorge de Montemayor and the pastoral works of Ariosto and Tasso) which uses a prose frame in which is inserted short stories and short plays in verse. Montreux's work would be the most significant pastoral novel produced in France until L'Astrée by Honoré d'Urfé.

He wrote several long adventure novels which, like Bérolade de Verville's, were inspired by the Hispano-Portuguese chivalric adventure novel (like Amadis of Gaul) and the ancient Greek novel (like the works of Heliodorus of Emesa or Achilles Tatius): Les chastes et delectables Jardins d'Amour semez de divers discours et histoires amoureuses (1594), L’Œuvre de la Chasteté, qui se remarque par les diverses fortunes, adventures et fidelles Amours de Criniton et de Lydie in three volumes (1595–9) et Les Amours de Cleandre et Domiphille (1597).

Montreux is responsible for several plays: four tragedies Tragédie du jeune Cyrus (drawn from Xenophon, 1581), Isabelle (1594), Cléopâtre (1594), Sophonisbe (1601); two comedies La Joyeuse (drawn from Xenophon, 1581) and Joseph le Chaste; 3 pastorals Athlette (1585), Diane (1592) Arimène ou le berger désespéré (1597). He also wrote religious poems, a history of the Ottoman Empire from 1565 to 1606, and a long work of spiritual philosophy L'Homme et ses dignités (1599).

Apart from his Bergeries de Juliette, Nicolas de Montreux was largely forgotten by the end of the 17th century, yet he remains an important precursor to the baroque novel of the first half of the 17th century.
