= Jean de Sponde =

French poet

Jean de Sponde (Joanes Ezponda; 1557 in Basque – 18 March 1595) was a Baroque French poet.

== Biography ==
Born at Mauléon, in what is now Pyrénées-Atlantiques, Jean de Sponde was raised in an austere Protestant family in the Basque region of France (some critics believe his family had Spanish roots) with close relations with the royal court of Navarre. A bright student at the College of Lascar (1569), he received funds for his education from Jeanne d'Albret, the mother of Henry de Navarre (the future Henry IV of France), and went on to learn ancient Greek and Protestant theology.

Despite his religious upbringing, in his early writings Jean de Sponde turned toward worldly literature: he produced an edition of Homer accompanied by an extensive Latin commentary which was printed in Basel in 1583, and wrote love poems (The Amours, published posthumously in 1597 with Poésies posthumes).

In 1580, with the help of a travel grant provided by Henry of Navarre, he moved to Basel to study under Théodore de Bèze. Sometime later, the king of Navarre gave him a position as maître des requêtes.

In 1582, Jean de Sponde became profoundly moved after reading the Psalms, and from this point on his writings took on a religious orientation, leaving the author to consider his early love poems as fadaises (worthless things). It is from this period that he wrote what are considered his most important works: Méditations sur les psaumes ("Meditations on the Psalms") and Essai de quelques poèmes chrétiens ("Essay of Several Christian Poems", 1588). In this last collection, Jean de Sponde explored the passage of time, the shortness of life and the presence of death in man's life.

He left Basel and returned to Navarre as royal counsellor and maître des requêtes in 1583, and married. Upon a trip to Paris in 1589, Sponde was imprisoned by the Catholic League for his religion. Upon his liberation, he became lieutenant-general of the appellate court (sénéchaussée) in La Rochelle, but left the city in 1593 and returned to Tours. After a second imprisonment for his beliefs, he converted to Catholicism in Tours in 1593, following the example of Henry IV. This conversion however earned him the hatred of the Protestants (his friend d'Aubigné became his personal enemy) and distanced him from the king (who sought to maintain his alliances with the huguenots). Sponde then moved to Bordeaux and spent the last years of his life writing against Calvinist theology.

He died in Bordeaux in poverty in 1595.

== Poetry ==
Jean de Sponde's youthful Amours comprise 26 sonnets in the manner of other love sonnet sequences of the period (as made fashionable by the members of La Pléiade). His posthumous collection also includes various other long lyric poems (stances), chansons and elegies.

Jean de Sponde's later poetry is impregnated with the major themes of the so-called French "baroque" poetry of the period and with the moral concerns of the huguenots. His poetry is often placed alongside the works of Agrippa d'Aubigné and Guillaume de Salluste Du Bartas as the major poetic works of the French Renaissance Protestants.

His Essai de quelques poèmes chrétiens comprise 12 sonnets and three long lyric poems (two on the Last Supper and one on death). Sponde's writing paints the massiveness of the world, man's tortured destiny, and his lack of clarity. The author is obsessed with inconstancy, masks, appearances, and death, and this presence of death in the midst of man's life inspires man to seek eternity and to reach out to God.
