= Noël du Fail =

French jurist and writer

Noël du Fail, seigneur de La Hérissaye (c. 1520 – 1591) was a French jurist and writer of the Renaissance. His collections of tales are an important document of rural life in the sixteenth century in Brittany.

== Biography ==
Noël du Fail was born into a rural noble family, at the family property of Château-Letard. He studied law and obtained an office at the provincial courts in Rennes in 1552. As magistrate, he wrote a collection of legal decisions from the Brittany parliament, Mémoires recueillis et extraits des plus notables et solennels arrests du Parlement de Bretagne (1579).

Du Fail is best known today for being one of the principal French story writers of the Renaissance, and especially as the author of the Propos rustiques (1547), a work which describes the life of two villages near Rennes (Vindelles and Flameaux) and, through the memories of four old peasants, gives portraits of some of their memorable inhabitants. Alternating between a bucolic portrait and Rabelaisian humor, the complex, linguistically rich and often satirical work defies easy interpretation. It is also one of the few works of the period to be entirely centered on peasant life.

His later texts—Baliverneries d'Eutrapel (1548) and Les Contes et Discours d’Eutrapel (1585)—are in roughly the same vein, but with noble characters at the center of the works: the prudent Polygame, the trickster Lupold and the joyous Eutrapel. The dialogue of the three men, mixing both moral reflection and irony, serves as a frame for a series of fables and descriptive portraits. The short comic tales and anecdotes are at first glance merely amusing, but behind their light tone, verbal fantasy and amusing portraits lie profound moral, political and religious reflections (du Fail has been suspected of converting to Protestantism), linking du Fail to the other great humanists and story writers of Renaissance, such as Montaigne and Rabelais.

Du Fail died in Rennes.

== Works ==
=== Original editions ===
- Propos rustiques de maistre Léon Ladulfi, champenois, Lyon, Jean de Tournes, 1547, in-8°
- Baliverneries d’Eutrapel, Paris, 1548.
- Les Contes et Discours d’Eutrapel, par le feu seigneur de la Herissaye gentilhomme breton, Rennes, Noël Glamet de Quinpercorentin, 1585, 8°.

=== Modern editions ===
- Propos rustiques de maistre Leon Ladulfi champenois, 1547, critical edition by Arthur de La Borderie with variants from the editions of 1548, 1549, 1573, Paris, Lemerre, 1878 (republished by Slatkine reprints, 1976).
- Propos rustiques de maistre Leon Ladulfi champenois, 1549, edition and introduction, notes et glossary by G.-A. Pérouse and R. Dubuis, Geneva, Droz, 1994.
- Propos rustiques, translation in modern French by Aline Leclercq-Magnien, Paris, Jean Picollec editions, 1988.
- Propos rustiques and Baliverneries in Conteurs français du XVIe siècle, Pierre Jourda, editor, Gallimard, La Pléiade, 1965.
