= François Béroalde de Verville =

François Béroalde de Verville (27 April 1556 – 19–26 October 1626) was a French Renaissance novelist, poet and intellectual. He was born in Paris, the son of Matthieu Brouard (or Brouart), called "Béroalde", a professor of Agrippa d'Aubigné and Pierre de l'Estoile and a Huguenot; his mother, Marie Bletz, was the niece of the humanist and Hebrew scholar François Vatable (called "Watebled"). At the time of the St. Bartholomew's Day Massacre, his family fled to Geneva (1573), but Béroalde returned to Paris in 1581. During the civil wars, Béroalde abjured Calvinism and joined the factions around Henri III of France (he may also have served in the army). In 1589 he moved to Tours (the French parlement fled here from 1589-1594), and became chanoine (canon) of the cathedral chapter of Saint Gatien, Tours, where he remained until his death.

== Works ==
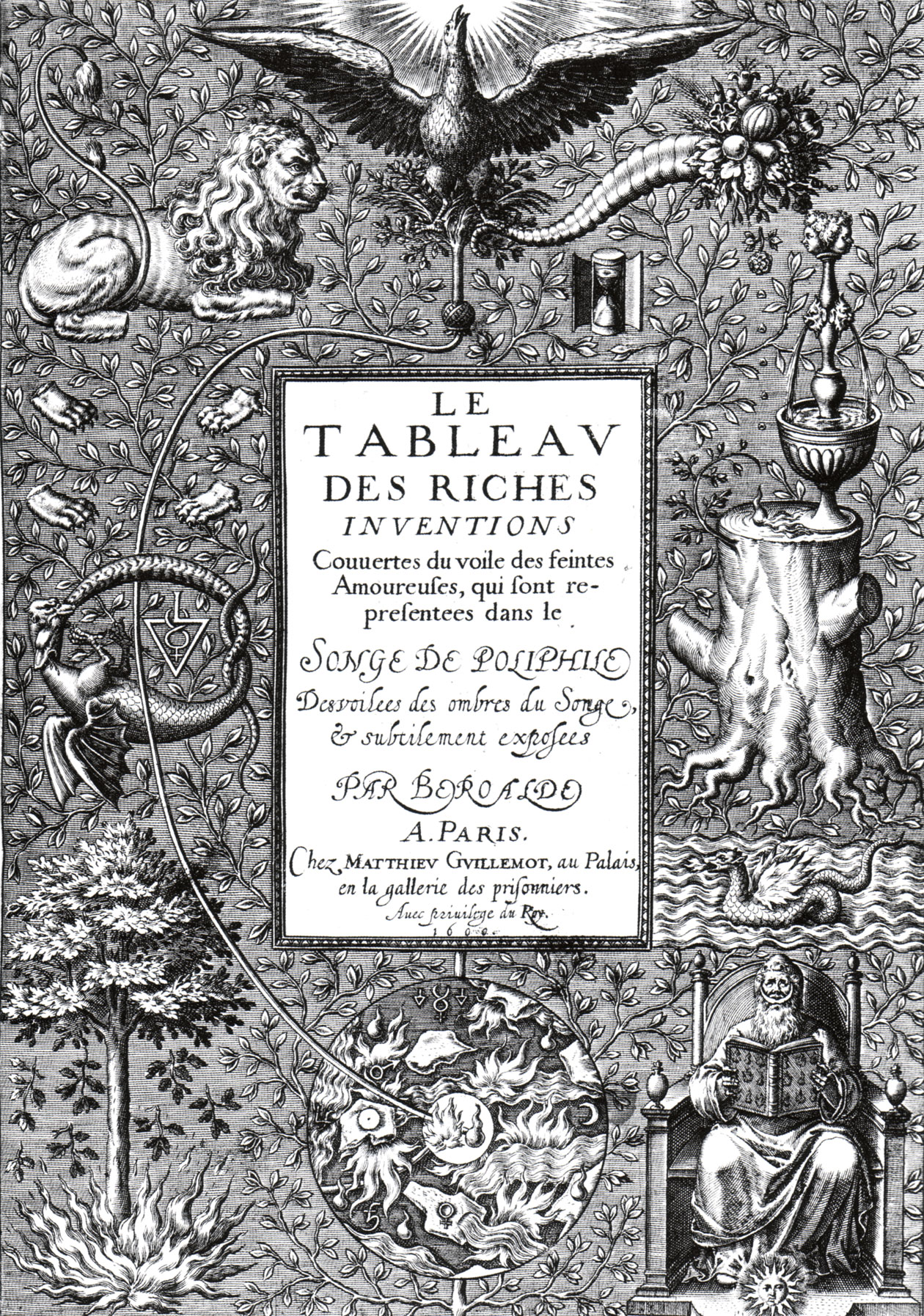
Le tableau des riches inventions (1600)

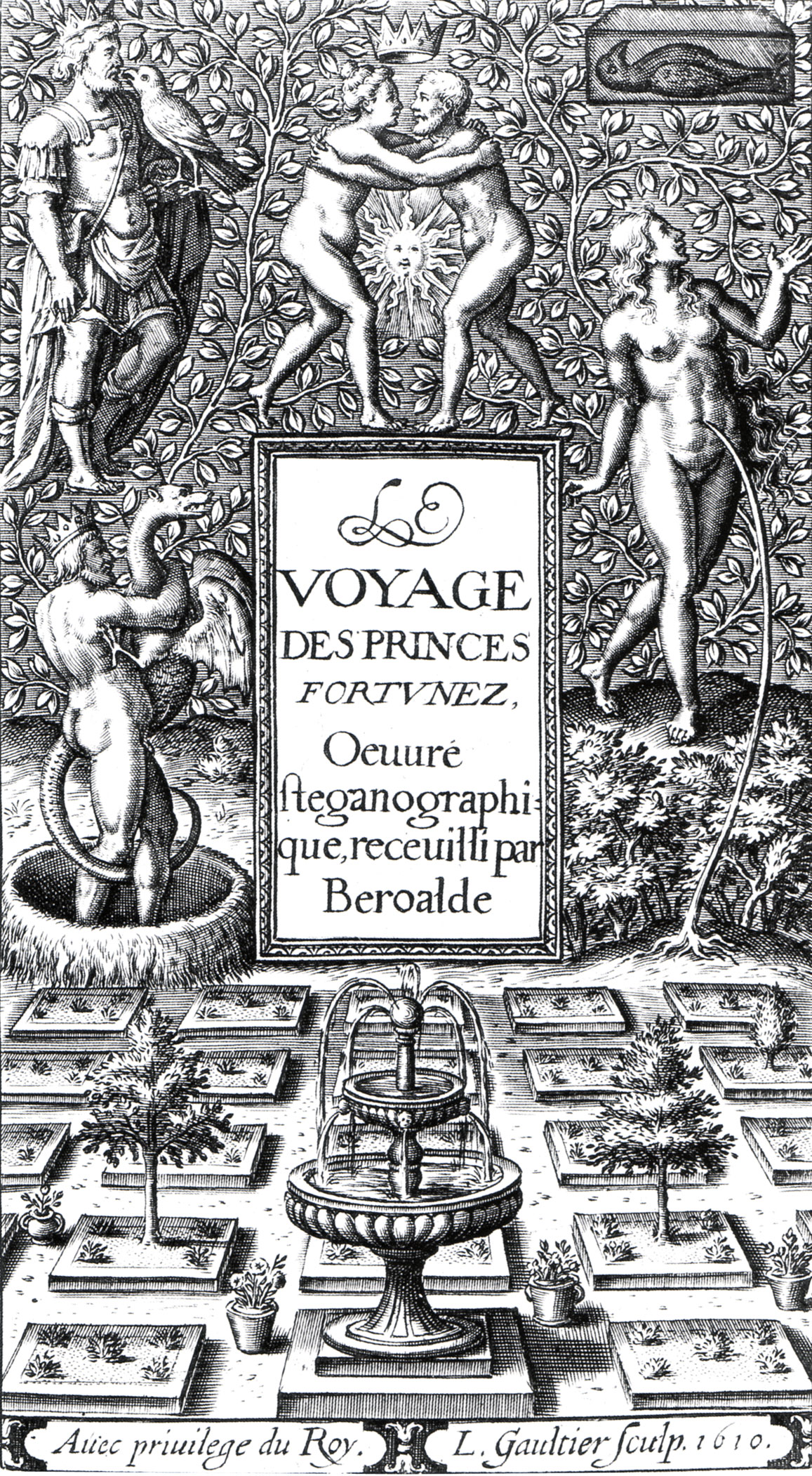
Le voyage des princes fortunés (1610)

Béroalde had close ties to the intellectual and creative milieus of the late 16th century and early 17th century (including Pierre de L'Estoile, Roland Brisset, Guy de Tours) and was under the protection of two conseillers du roi (Pierre Brochard and René Crespin). His writings cover topics as varied as history, mathematics, optics, alchemy, medicine, painting, sculpture, love, silk... He wrote in both verse and prose, and in all manner of tones (satirical, moral, spiritual, philosophical, political). Béroalde represents a literature of transition from the Valois court (and the generation of "La Pléiade") to the Bourbon court of Henri IV and the baroque, and (like his contemporary Nicolas de Montreux) he attempted to compete with the translation of foreign masterpieces by the creation of original works in French.

His first works were contributions to a work on mathematics and mechanics (1578) and to a history of blazons (1581). His numerous historical and philosophical works include: Les Recherches de la pierre philosophale on the philosopher's stone (1583); Dialogue de la vertu (1584); L'idée de la republique (1584); a translation of Justus Lipsius (1592); De l'ame et de ses excellences (1593), De la sagesse (1593); La Pucelle d'Orleans on Joan of Arc (1599); a history of silk worms (1600); a history of Herodias (1600); and a French edition with commentaries of Francesco Colonna's Hypnerotomachia Poliphili (1600).

His poetry includes: Les Apprehensions spirituelles, poemes et autres oeuvres philosophiques (1583); love poems, Les Soupirs amoureux (1583); a contribution of verses to the translation of La Diane by Jorge de Montemayor (1592); spiritual poems, La Muse celeste (1593); and a translation of Jeremiah's Book of Lamentations, Les Tenebres (1599).

Béroalde published several long fiction works: Les Avantures de Floride, histoire françoise in 4 tomes (1593-1596), Le Cabinet de Minerve (1596), an unfinished novel Le Restablissement de Troye, avec lequel parmy les hazards des armes, se voyent les amours d’Æsionne (1597), Le Voyage des princes fortunes (1610), and Le Palais des curieux (1612). With their elaborate plots, multiple characters and adventurous situations, these adventure novels show the inspiration of the Hispano-Portuguese chivalric adventure novel (like Amadis of Gaul) and of the ancient Greek novel (like the work of Heliodorus of Emesa or Achilles Tatius), but they also straddle the line between fiction and philosophical or encyclopedic writing, and frequently veer off into discussions of moral phenomena or in symbolic ekphrasis (inspired by the Hypnerotomachia Poliphili) of cabinets of curiosities, architecture and other elements.

His most famous work is the playful, chaotic, baroque, sometimes obscene and almost unreadable Moyen de parvenir (first published around 1617) -- a parody of books of "table talk", of Rabelais and of Michel de Montaigne's "The Essays"—in which a host of famous individuals debate, discuss and joke (with often coarse humor) about historical and philosophical matters.

Béroalde's corpus is vast and his works show a preoccupation with encyclopedic learning, the organization of knowledge and the difficulties of interpretation.

Largely forgotten since the 17th century, Béroalde was rediscovered in the 19th century and has gained renewed critical appreciation in recent years.
