= Nicolas de Herberay des Essarts =

Nicolas de Herberay des Essarts (died c. 1557) was a French translator born in Picardy.

== Translations ==
Herberay des Essarts served in the artillery. At the express desire of Francis I, he translated into French the first eight books of the Spanish work Amadís de Gaula (1540–48). The remaining books were translated by other authors.

His other translations from the Spanish include L'Amant maltraite de sa mye (1539), Le Prèmier Livre de la chronique de dom Flores de Grèce (1552), and L'Horloge des princes (1555) from Antonio de Guevara. He also translated the works of Josephus (1557).

The Amadis de Gaula was translated into English by Anthony Munday in 1619.
