= Étienne Tabourot =

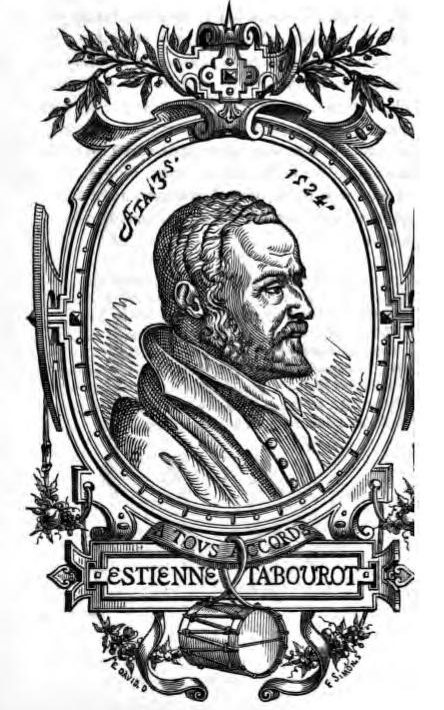
Étienne Tabourot

Étienne Tabourot (French pronunciation: [etjɛn tabuʁo]), seigneur des Accords, also called Tabourot des Accords or Seigneur des Accords (1549–1590) was a French jurist, writer and poet of the Renaissance.

== Biography ==
He was born in Dijon. His uncle, Jean Tabourot (1520-1595), was a writer, canon and religious official in Langres. Étienne Tabourot did his studies at the College de Bourgogne in Paris and then at the university of Toulouse where he studied law. Returning to Dijon, in 1582 he bought an office of "King's attorney" ("procureur du roi") in the jurisdiction of Dijon and became an active member of the Catholic League during the French Wars of Religion.

He died in Dijon.

== Works ==
Tabourot produced two youthful works in Paris: Latin translations of Pierre de Ronsard's Fourmy and of Remy Belleau's Papillon. In 1572, he published a collection of sonnets and a dictionary of rhymes, and continued to write poetry throughout his life. In 1587 he published a Latin and French historical portrait of the last four Dukes of Burgundy.

Tabourot is chiefly known for his collections of tales, witticisms, and miscellaneous observations:

- Les Bigarrures (i.e., "The Variegations") (Paris, 1572); in 1583 its title was changed to Le premier livre des Bigarrures où est traité de toutes sortes de folies (i.e., "The First Book of Variegations in which is discussed all sorts of Follies") – a collection of word games, puns, acrostics, etc.
- Les Bigarrures du Seigneur des Accords, quatrième livre (1585) (i.e., "The Fourth Book of Variegations of Seigneur des Accords") – commentaries on the education of children, on versification, on witchcraft and fake witches, etc. (the "fourth" of the title being intentionally chosen as an obfuscation).
- Les Touches (1585) – a collection of commonplaces in the form of epigrams.
- Les Apopthegmes or Contes facétieux du sieur Gaulard, gentilhomme de la Franche-Comté bourguignonne (i.e., "Humorous Tales of Lord Gaulard, noble of the Burgundian Franche-Comté") (published posthumously in Paris, 1614) – a collection of comedic tales, published with the following:
- Les Escraignes dijonnaises (i.e., "The Winter Huts of Dijon") (published posthumously in Paris, 1614) – a collection of popular folk tales.
