= Diego de San Pedro =

Castilian writer (c. 1437 – c. 1498)

- Born: c. 1437
- Died: c. 1498 (aged 60–61)
- Occupation: Writer
- Writing career
- Period: c.1480–1498
- Genres: Sentimental romance Cancionero
- Notable work: Tractado de amores de Arnalte y Lucenda (1491); Cárcel de amor (1492)

Diego de San Pedro (c. 1437 – c. 1498) was a Castilian writer. Little is known about him, besides what is included in his works. Scholars also rely on what they infer from the context in which he wrote and the many nobles to whom he has been linked.

== Life ==
According to San Pedro's prologues in Tractado de amores de Arnalte y Lucenda (The Love Between Arnalte and Lucenda), Cárcel de amor (The Prison of Love), and Desprecio de la Fortuna (The Disdain of Fortune), San Pedro could not have written before 1470.

The Tractado de amores de Arnalte y Lucenda is dedicated to Queen Isabel's ladies-in-waiting and to the queen herself. Its second edition describes San Pedro as a servant of Don Juan Téllez-Girón, Count of Urueña. Don Juan was powerful, because he was the half brother of Isabel and was favored by King Enrique IV of Castile. San Pedro dedicated Desprecio de la Fortuna to him, calls him “his lord,” and says that he was in his service for 29 years. San Pedro dedicates Cárcel de Amor to Diego Fernández de Córdoba. Diego Fernández was also related to the Téllez-Girón family, because he married Juana Pacheco, a niece of the count. He was 'alcaide de los donceles', or the leader of a light-cavalry troop of privileged young men who served as the king's bodyguard. San Pedro also mentions Doña Marina Manuel, a member of the highest Castilian nobility, in this prologue.

Carmen Parrilla assumes that San Pedro was a grown man by the end of the 15th century, when he wrote Desprecio de la Fortuna, because he apologized for the mistakes of his youth in this work. Parrilla has found that San Pedro was writing in the 1480s and 1490s for the queen's entourage. He probably died and went unnoticed by the younger people who were unfamiliar with him.

According to Keith Whinnom, San Pedro could not have been a major literary figure of Queen Isabel's court. Indeed, San Pedro expresses fear of the women's mockery in his dedication to the ladies in Tractado de amores de Arnalte y Lucenda. Whinnom describes San Pedro as an hidalgo, or a member of the lower nobility, who did as he was ordered, seemed afraid of ridicule, and was willing to go to extreme lengths to please the ladies-in-waiting of the queen.

Lastly, it is unclear if Diego de San Pedro was a converso (convert from Judaism to Christianity) or if he was not. It was common for those who converted to Christianity to use a saint's name as the family names. However, Whinnom points out that both old and new Christians followed this practice. San Pedro's professions as secretary to the Count of Urueña could also indicate that he was a Jewish converso, but there is no extant evidence of this fact. Several scholars point to the tone of some of San Pedro's works in support the theory, and maintain that Cárcel del amor is a literary response to the initiation of the Inquisition, but all this is mere speculation.

== Sentimental romance ==
The Spanish sentimental romance is a 15th and early 16th century prose genre that uses courtly love to explore the themes of desire and death. Authors use first and third person narration to delve into two frustrated and violent love, (i.e. courtly and physical love). When the courtly code dominates, there is no physical relationship and frustration follows, showing love's destructive nature.

== Works ==
- La pasión trobada (circa 1480) is one of San Pedro's earliest works, dedicated to a nun. This spiritual text, written in octosyllabic verses and direct speech, describes the Passion of Christ in horrific detail. As a means of devotion, San Pedro also dedicates this work to the Passion of Mary, with more detail than the Gospel grants her. With the exception of a few legendary stories and minor changes determined by the rhyme scheme or verse length, this work parallels the Gospel text.
- Las siete angustias de Nuestra Señora (The Seven Sorrows of Our Lady, circa 1480) is a poem derived from La pasión trobada. San Pedro copied eleven stanzas from La pasión and altered six half-stanzas to create this new poem.
- Sermón (circa 1485) is a parody that instructs men and women on how to act in the context of love, emphasizing the inferiority of men in love, but also stressing the importance of women in consoling their lovers.
- Tractado de amores de Arnalte y Lucenda (The Story of the Loves of Arnalte and Lucenda, 1491) is one of the two sentimental romances for which Diego de San Pedro is best known for. French, Italian, and English translations of this work, along with Cárcel de amor, are available. The works known as sentimental romances are prose narratives that tend to be characterized by a lack of uniformity. In comparison to chivalric romances, sentimental romances tend to be shorter in length and more united in action. Letters, monologues, and speeches are used to develop the plot of a sentimental romance. Tractado de amores de Arnalte y Lucenda has a narrator known as “el autor,” who relays the story as told by the protagonist, Arnalte. Arnalte is a nobleman from Thebes, who tries to win the love of Lucenda and repeatedly fails. Arnalte asks the narrator to dedicate his story to the compassionate ladies of Queen Isabel's court. This work also includes a formal praise of the queen.
- Arnalte y Lucenda and La Cárcel de Amor are both considered to be sentimental romances, but are often viewed as literary foils of each other; a great deal of research on the two works contrasts them. They are both also seen as a reflection of the political, social, and cultural ferment of the Renaissance and Golden Age that leads to our own time. There is also the question of which of the two is the more “modern.” In this regard, Carcel del Amor is often considered the more romantic of the two, with its tragic ending and exploration of class differences as an impediment of the relationship between Leriano and Laureola. However, both works show the waning of the traditional Ovidian influence on medieval Spanish literature. For example, some scholars believe that both pieces critically parody Ovid's Ars Amatoria through the ultimate failure of the male protagonist to successfully attain his female love, despite attempts at seduction–pointing up the failure of Ovid's rules to the “art of seduction” in the Ars. San Pedro's rich, exaggerated prose is considered part of the parody.
- Cárcel de amor (Prison of Love, 1492) is the other sentimental novel that Diego de San Pedro is famous for and perhaps his most well-known work. This work was dedicated to Fernández de Córdoba, alcaide de los donzeles. Like Tractado de amores de Arnalte y Lucenda, Cárcel de amor is narrated by “el autor” and consists mainly of letters, monologues, and speeches in place of dialogue. In the story, a young noble called Leriano has fallen in love with Laureola, the heir to the throne of Macedonia, and is trapped in an allegorical 'prison of love', which he is freed from when he communicates with Laureola through “el autor.” Persio, who is also in love with Laureola, tells the king that she has had relations with Leriano, and Laureola is imprisoned. Leriano frees Laureola forcibly from prison and kills Persio. When Laureola rejects his love in a letter, Leriano opts to die, but praises women on his deathbed. Carcel del Amor was extremely popular upon its publication and was quickly translated into other languages. It also had a strong influence on Fernando de Rojas’ La Celestina, a work often considered the “most successful piece of fiction of the entire Golden Age,” including a direct borrowing of some of its central themes. However, they have different endings: Celestina is the tale of a man's affair with a woman who probably belongs to the Spanish bourgeoisie. Many modern narrative elements are explored in Cárcel del Amor, including some increased reliance on dialogue and the appearance of a narrator.
- Desprecio de la Fortuna (1498) is San Pedro's final work. It is inspired by the writings of the philosopher Boethius. This poem was dedicated to Juan Téllez-Girón, count of Urueña, who left the Spanish court after suffering from a series of misfortunes.

== Cancionero verse ==
In addition to being famous for his popular fiction, Diego de San Pedro is also recognized for his cancionero verse, a type of lyric poetry that was one of the bases of entertainment at the Catholic Monarchs court. In 1511, twenty-two of his minor poems were published in Hernando del Castillo's anthology entitled the Cancionero general (General Compilation). San Pedro's courtly poetry is characterized by the theme of love, and shows a preference for octosyllabic verse, and the use of abstract terms which create ambiguity.
