= François de Belleforest =

French author

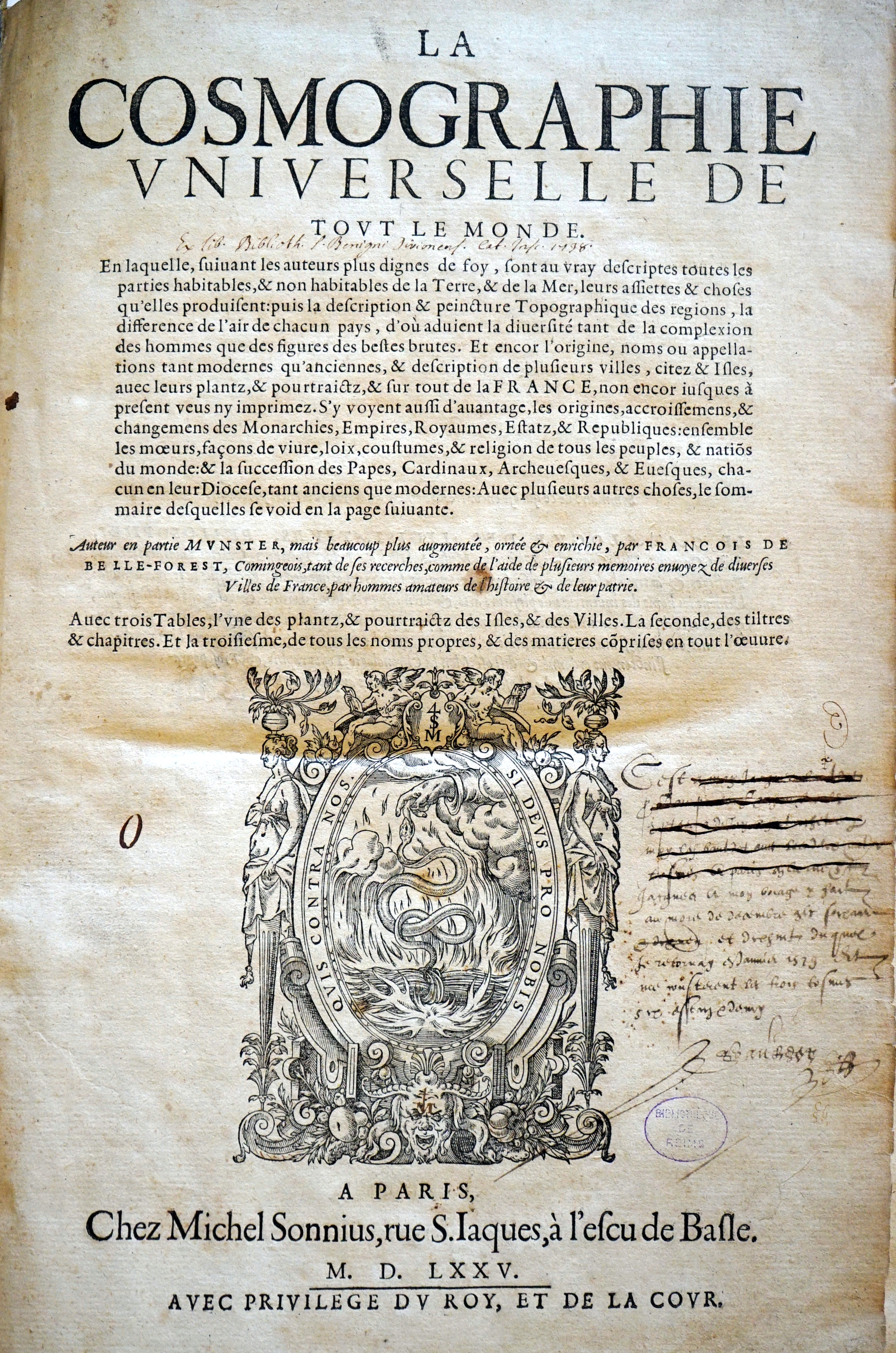
Title page from Belleforest's French translation of the Cosmographie (1575)

François de Belleforest (1530 – 1 January 1583) was a French writer, poet and translator of the Renaissance.

He was born in Samatan, into a poor family, and his father (a soldier) was killed when he was seven. He spent some time in the court of Marguerite of Navarre, traveled to Toulouse and Bordeaux (where he met George Buchanan), and then to Paris where he came into contact with members of the young literary generation, including Pierre de Ronsard, Jean Antoine de Baïf, Jean Dorat, Remy Belleau, Antoine Du Verdier and Odet de Turnèbe. In 1568 he became historiographer to the king. He died in Paris.

Belleforest wrote on cosmography, morals, literature and history, and he translated the works of Matteo Bandello, Boccaccio, Antonio de Guevara, Lodovico Guicciardini, Polydore Vergil, Saint Cyprian, Sebastian Münster, Achilles Tatius, Cicero and Demosthenes into French. He is also the author of the first French pastoral novel, La Pyrénée (or La Pastorale amoureuse) (1571) modeled on the Diana of Jorge de Montemayor. His Grandes Annales are a polemic tract against François Hotman. His total output comprises more than 50 volumes.

His most successful work was most likely his translation and adaptation of the "histoires tragiques" by the Italian Matteo Bandello, which built on the work of Pierre Boaistuau and eventually amounted to seven volumes (1564–1582). One of these tales might be the source for Shakespeare's Hamlet.

== Selected works ==
- La chasse d'amour (poems), 1561.
- Continuation des histoires tragiques, contenant douze histoires tirées de Bandel...., translation of Matteo Bandello, 1559.
- Histoires tragiques, translation of Matteo Bandello, 7 volumes, 1566–1583.
- Les Amours de Clitophon et de Leucippe by Achilles Tatius, 1568.
- L’histoire universelle du monde, 1570
- La Pyrénée (or La Pastorale amoureuse), 1571.
- Harengue militaires, et concions de princes, capitaines, embassadeurs, et autres manians tant la guerre que les affaires d'Estat ... Recueillis et faictes Françoyses, by Françoys de Belle-Forest. Paris, Nicolas Chesneau, 1572
- La Cosmographie universelle de tout le monde. Paris, 1575. Nicolas Chesneau and Michel Sonnius. French translation of the Cosmographia of Sebastian Münster, with substantial additional material.
- Grandes Annales et histoire générale de France, 1579.
- Les sentences illustrés de M.T. Ciceron Et les apophthegmes, avec quelquel sentences de piete, recueillies de mesme Ciceron. Aveei les plus remarquables sentences tant de Terence... et de... Demosthene. Le tout Traduit nouvellement de Latin en Francais par Francois de Belle-forest, Commingeoiis. Reveu & corrige. Jacob Stoer, (Geneva): 1609.
- Les chroniques et annales de France, dès l'origine des François, & leur venue en Gaule. Pierre Chevalier, 1621. Last edition and the most complete of the Chroniques of Nicole Gilles, first published in 1525.

== See also ==
Other major translators from his period:

- Jacques Amyot
- Claude Colet
- Jacques Gohory
- Nicolas de Herberay des Essarts
