= Matteo Bandello =

Italian writer (c. 1480–1562)

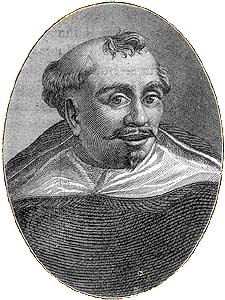
Matteo Bandello

Matteo Bandello (c. 1480–1562) was an Italian writer, soldier, Dominican friar and bishop, best known for his novellas. His collection of 214 novellas made him the most popular short-story writer of his day.

== Biography ==
Matteo Bandello was born at Castelnuovo Scrivia, near Tortona (current Piedmont), c. 1480. He received a good education, and entered the church, but does not seem to have been very interested in theology. For many years he lived at Mantua and Castel Goffredo, and superintended the education of the celebrated Lucrezia Gonzaga, in whose honour he composed a long poem. The decisive Battle of Pavia, as a result of which Lombardy was taken by the emperor, compelled Bandello to flee; his house at Milan was burnt and his property confiscated. He took refuge with Cesare Fregoso, an Italian general in the French service, whom he accompanied into France.

He was later raised to the bishopric of Agen, a town in which he resided for many years before his death in 1562. Bandello wrote a number of poems, but his fame rests entirely on his extensive collection of Novelle, or tales (1554, 1573), which have been extremely popular. They belong to the same genre as Boccaccio’s Decameron and Marguerite de Navarre’s Heptaméron. The common origin of them all is to be found in the old French fabliaux, though some well-known tales are evidently Eastern, and others classical. Bandello’s novellas are thought the best of those written in imitation of the Decameron, though Italian critics find fault with them for negligence and inelegance of style.

The stories on which William Shakespeare based several of his plays (Much Ado about Nothing, Romeo and Juliet and Twelfth Night in particular) were supplied by Bandello, probably through Belleforest and Pierre Boaistuau whose stories were later translated into English by William Paynter and included in his The Palace of Pleasure. Another of his stories includes "The countess of Cellant", a distortion of Challand, a northwest region of Italy.

== English translations of novellas ==
The only nearly complete translation of Bandello's tales into English is "The novels of Matteo Bandello", translated by John Payne in 6 volumes, 1890. This edition is separated into 4 parts, containing 51, 43, 51, and 21 stories, respectively, for a total of 166, minus two (part 2, story 35 and part 4, story 6), omitted because of their being almost identical to those of Marguerite de Navarre's Heptaméron (stories 30 and 17, respectively), though keeping Bandello's dedicatory preface.

There is a second book of Bandello in an English translation (1892) by Percy Edward Pinkerton and containing twelve tales. This translation uses more modern modes of expression than Payne's translation.

In 2023 Michael Curtotti published a translation of Bandello’s Romeo and Juliet story into modern English: Romeo and Juliet: A New English Translation. There is critical apparatus on the similarities between Bandello’s and Shakespeare’s versions; and Bandello’s text is divided into paragraphs for ease of comparison with the translation on facing pages.

== Source material ==
The vast majority of the stories derive from those Bandello heard from contemporaries, reported as real life events. Far more rarely, some stories are based on literary or historical sources, such as book 5 of Dante's Purgatory (part 1, story 11), the Lucretia and Tarquin episode in Livy's History of Rome (part 2, story 15), story #23 of the Heptaméron (part 2, story 17), and Francesco Petrarch's Triumph of Love from Triumphs (part 2, story 41). Some derive from English history, such as the chronicle of Mary Douglas, niece to King Henry VIII of England (part 3, story 44) and Henry VIII's six wives (part 3, story 45), some from Spanish history, such as Alfonso X (part 4, story 10). All of them were told to him by men, but a minority of dedicatory prefaces are offered to women. Bandello writes that the dedicatory prefaces to the nobility or to worthy persons are useful to him as a shield in case someone becomes offended by one of the stories and is tempted to attack him (part 2, story 32). He shows psychological insight into jealousy, in particular the description of two types of jealous men, the first from feelings of inadequacy and the second from feelings of the fickleness of women (part 3, story 47).

The most striking stories include two whores seeking to win their husbands back (part 1, story 17), two brother thieves in cahoots to rob the treasures of the king of Egypt (part 1, story 23), a disdained lover voluntarily choosing to live inside a cave (part 1, story 25), a woman killing herself only out of fear that her good fortune will turn bad (part 1, story 48), Filippo Lippi, released from slavery in Africa because of his talent as a celebrated painter (part 1, story 50), a woman disdaining a man and then killing herself when he no longer pursues her (part 2, story 16), an abbot making music from a chorus of pigs (part 2, story 23), an adulterous lover buried alive and then saved (part 3, story 1), a merchant's murder of another (part 4, story 1), a case of double adultery whereby each husband cuckolds the other (part 4, story 11), and two women yelling at each other after being falsely told they are hard of hearing (part 4, story 21).

== Plays by Shakespeare ==
Four Bandello stories were adapted by Shakespeare, including Cymbeline (part 1, story 19), the Claudio subplot of Much Ado about Nothing (part 1, story 22), Romeo and Juliet (part 2, story 6), and Twelfth Night (part 2, story 28), plus one from the Shakespeare Apocrypha, Edward III (part 2, story 29).

== Plays by others ==
Bandello stories have also been adapted by other dramatists, including John Webster, The Duchess of Malfi (part 1, story 24), Philip Massinger, The Picture (part 1, story 19), the same source as that of Cymbeline, John Marston and Jean Mairet, Sophonisba (part 1, story 35), John Fletcher, The Maid in the Inn (part 2, story 11), the anonymous 17th century French author of The Cruel Moor (1618) (part 3, story 17), Giuseppe Giacosa, La Signora di Challant, The Lady of Challand (part 1, story 4) and more than 15 plays by Spanish Lope de Vega, among which Castelvines y Monteses (published in 1647 and written between 1604 and 1618) follows the same famous story of Romeo and Juliet (part 2, story 9).
