= Heptaméron =

1558 story collection by Marguerite de Navarre

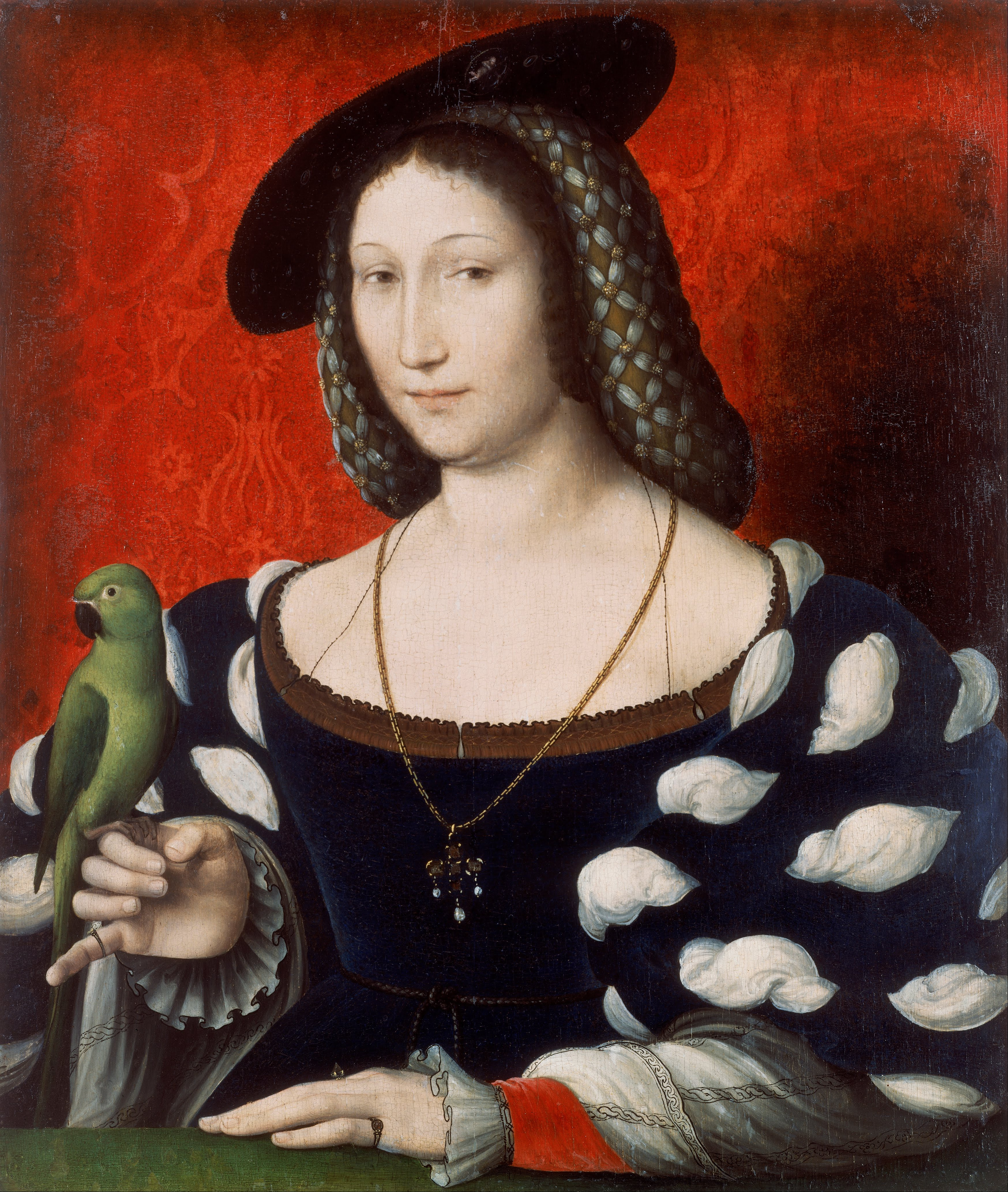
Portrait of Marguerite, Queen of Navarre, attributed to Jean Clouet, c. 1530.

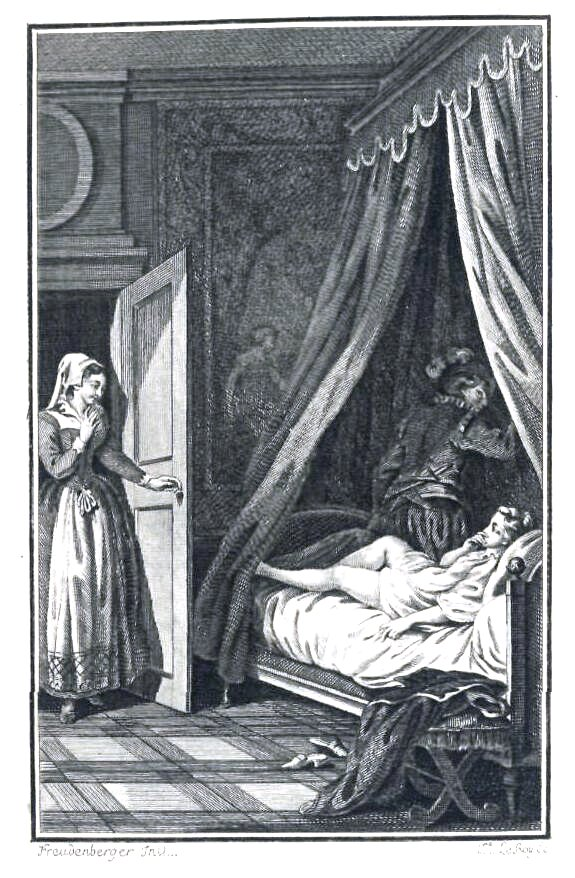
The Gentleman's Spur catching in the Sheet. Illustration from an 1894 edition of The Tales of the Heptameron.

The Heptaméron is a collection of 72 short stories written in French by Marguerite de Navarre (1492–1549), published posthumously in 1558. It has the form of a frame narrative and was inspired by The Decameron of Giovanni Boccaccio. It was originally intended to contain one hundred stories covering ten days like The Decameron, but at Marguerite’s death it was completed only as far as the second story of the eighth day.

Many of the stories deal with love, lust, infidelity, and other romantic and sexual matters. One was based on the life of Marguerite de La Rocque, a French noblewoman who was punished by being abandoned with her lover on an island off Quebec.

In 1973, the French director Claude Pierson made an adaptation of this work, entitled Oh, If Only My Monk Would Want (Ah! Si mon moine voulait...) as a French and Canadian coproduction, with a cast of both French and Quebecois actors.

== History of the text ==
The collection first appeared in print in 1558 under the title Histoires des amans fortunez edited by Pierre Boaistuau, who took considerable liberties with the original version; he used only 67 of the stories, many in abbreviated form, and omitted much of the significant material between the stories. He also transposed stories and ignored their grouping into days as envisaged by the author.

A second edition by Claude Gruget appeared only a year later in which the editor claimed to have "restored the order previously confused in the first impression". Gruget put back the prologues and epilogues to each short story left out by Boaistuau. He also gave, for the first time, the title Heptaméron to the collection of novellas (from the Greek ἑπτά – "seven" and ἡμέρα – "day"), due to the seven-day time frame into which the first 70 short stories are grouped, and as a clear reference to the Decameron.

The first complete English translation, by Arthur Machen, appeared in 1886. The most recent translation is by Paul Chilton in 1984 for Penguin Books.

== Summary of the "Prologue" ==
In the "Prologue" to The Heptameron, Parlamente, having obtained her husband Hircan's permission to do so, makes bold to ask Lady Oisille to devise an appropriate means by which the company of stranded guests, who are waiting for the building of a bridge to be completed and are beset by a series of natural calamities and criminal actions which keep them virtual prisoners in an abbey, may amuse themselves. A devout Christian, the lady suggests that they read the Bible. However, Hircan says that they are young enough to need other diversions as well. Parlamente suggests that those who want to write stories after the manner of Boccaccio, do so, sharing them with the others in the afternoon, after Scriptures are read in the morning. (Marguerite herself was a protector of François Rabelais, who dedicated the third volume of his book, Gargantua and Pantagruel, to her.) It will take 10 days to complete the bridge, and, each day, in a shady grove in a meadow, the writers will share 10 tales, telling a total of 100 stories. The stories will be published, if the audience likes them, and be presented to the listeners as presents.

Lady Oisille agrees to Parlamente's recommendation, provided that the stories are true.

== Sample story summarized ==
Saffrendent tells the third story, which is set in Naples, Italy, during the reign of King Alfonso.

During a carnival, the king visits his subjects’ homes as they vie to provide him the best hospitality. As he visits a happily married young couple, he is smitten by the wife’s beauty, and he sends her husband to Rome for a couple of weeks on trumped-up business. While the husband is away, the king succeeds in seducing the wife. After a while, the husband becomes suspicious of his wife’s fidelity. He bides his time in silence, hoping for the opportunity to avenge himself.

He convinces the queen that he loves her and that she deserves to be treated better by her husband, who dishonors her in cuckolding him. They agree to an adulterous affair between themselves, so that the nobleman cuckolds the king who has cuckolded him. Whenever the nobleman visits his country estates, the king visits his wife. Instead of going to his estates, the nobleman now goes to the castle to dally with the queen, while the king commits adultery with his wife. The affairs continue for years, well into the couples’ old age.

Like many stories of this sort, Saffredent’s tale deals with the theme of cuckoldry and depends on both dramatic and situational irony for its plot and effects.

== See also ==
- Cent Nouvelles Nouvelles
