= Theatre of France =

The theatre of France evolved from medieval liturgical dramatizations into forms such as farce, comedy and tragedy. During the 17th century, it was shaped by playwrights like Molière, Corneille and Racine, while after the 19th century, it embraced movements such as Naturalism and Symbolism. In the 20th century, innovators associated with the theatre of the absurd transformed dramatic conventions by abandoning traditional characters, plots and staging.

== Middle Ages ==
Discussions about the origins of non-religious theatre ("théâtre profane") — both drama and farce — in the Middle Ages remain controversial, but the idea of a continuous popular tradition stemming from Latin comedy and tragedy to the 9th century seems unlikely.

Most historians place the origin of medieval drama in the church's liturgical dialogues and "tropes". At first simply dramatizations of the ritual, particularly in those rituals connected with Christmas and Easter (see Mystery play), plays were eventually transferred from the monastery church to the chapter house or refectory hall and finally to the open air, and the vernacular was substituted for Latin. In the 12th century one finds the earliest extant passages in French appearing as refrains inserted into liturgical dramas in Latin, such as a Saint Nicholas (patron saint of the student clercs) play and a Saint Stephen play.

Dramatic plays in French from the 12th and 13th centuries:

- Le Jeu d'Adam (1150–1160) – written in octosyllabic rhymed couplets with Latin stage directions (implying that it was written by Latin-speaking clerics for a lay public)
- Le Jeu de Saint Nicolas – Jean Bodel – written in octosyllabic rhymed couplets
- Le Miracle de Théophile – Rutebeuf (c.1265)

The origins of farce and comic theatre remain equally controversial; some literary historians believe in a non-liturgical origin (among "jongleurs" or in pagan and folk festivals), others see the influence of liturgical drama (some of the dramas listed above include farcical sequences) and monastic readings of Plautus and Latin comic theatre.

Non-dramatic plays from the 12th and 13th centuries:

- Le Dit de l'herberie – Rutebeuf
- Courtois d'Arras (c.1228)
- Le Jeu de la feuillé (1275) – Adam de la Halle
- Le Jeu de Robin et Marion (a pastourelle) (1288) – Adam de la Halle
- Le Jeu du Pèlerin (1288)
- Le Garçon et l'aveugle (1266–1282) – earliest surviving French farce
- Aucassin et Nicolette (a chantefable) – a mixture of prose and lyrical passages

Select list of plays from the 14th and 15th centuries:

- La Farce de maître Trubert et d'Antrongnard – Eustache Deschamps
- Le Dit des quatre offices de l'ostel du roy – Eustache Deschamps
- Miracles de Notre Dame
- Bien Avisé et mal avisé (morality) (1439)
- La Farce de maître Pierre Pathelin (1464–1469) – this play had a great influence on Rabelais in the 16th century
- Le Franc archer de Bagnolet (1468–1473)
- Moralité (1486) – Henri Baude
- L'Homme pécheur (morality) (1494)
- La Farce du cuvier
- La Farce nouvelle du pâté et de la tarte

In the 15th century, the public representation of plays was organized and controlled by a number of professional and semi-professional guilds:

- Clercs de la Basoche (Paris) – Morality plays
- Enfants sans Souci (Paris) – Farces and Sotties
- Conards (Rouen)
- Confrérie de la Passion (Paris) – Mystery plays

Genres of theatre practiced in the Middle Ages in France:

- Farce – a realistic, humorous, and even coarse satire of human failings
- Sottie – generally a conversation among idiots ("sots"), full of puns and quidproquos
- Pastourelle – a play with a pastoral setting
- Chantefable – a mixed verse and prose form only found in "Aucassin et Nicolette"
- Mystery play – a depiction of the Christian mysteries or Saint's lives
- Morality play
- Miracle play
- Passion play
- Sermon Joyeux – a burlesque sermon

== Renaissance theatre ==
French theatre in the 16th-century followed the same patterns of evolution as the other literary genres of the period. For the first decades of the century, public theatre remained largely tied to its long medieval heritage of mystery plays, morality plays, farces, and soties, although the miracle play was no longer in vogue. Public performances were tightly controlled by a guild system.

The guild "les Confrères de la Passion" had exclusive rights to theatrical productions of mystery plays in Paris; in 1548, fear of violence or blasphemy resulting from the growing religious rift in France forced the Paris Parliament to prohibit performances of the mysteries in the capital, although they continued to be performed in other places. By the end of the century, only the "Confrères de la Passion" remained with exclusive control over public theatrical productions in Paris, and they rented out their theatre at the Hôtel de Bourgogne to theatrical troupes for a high price. In 1597, this guild abandoned its privilege which permitted other theatres and theatrical companies to eventually open in the capital. Another guild, the "Enfants Sans-Souci" was in charge of farces and soties, as too the "Clercs de la Basoche" who also performed morality plays. Like the "Confrères de la Passion", "la Basoche" came under political scrutiny (plays had to be authorized by a review board; masks or characters depicting living persons were not permitted), and they were finally suppressed in 1582.

Alongside the numerous writers of these traditional works (such as the farce writers Pierre Gringore, Nicolas de La Chesnaye and André de la Vigne), Marguerite de Navarre also wrote a number of plays close to the traditional mystery and morality play.

As early as 1503 however, original language versions of Sophocles, Seneca, Euripides, Aristophanes, Terence and Plautus were all available in Europe and the next 40 years would see humanists and poets both translating these classics and adapting them. In the 1540s, the French university setting (and especially—from 1553 on—the Jesuit colleges) became host to a Neo-Latin theatre (in Latin) written by professors such as George Buchanan and Marc Antoine Muret which would leave a profound mark on the members of La Pléiade. From 1550 on, one finds humanist theatre written in French. Prominent figures such as Catherine de' Medici provided financial support for many humanist plays; in 1554, for example, she commissioned a translation of Gian Giorgio Trissino’s La Sofonisba, which was the first tragedy to appear in the French language.

The influence of Seneca was particularly strong in humanist tragedy. His plays — which were essentially chamber plays meant to be read for their lyrical passages and rhetorical oratory — brought to many humanist tragedies a concentration on rhetoric and language over dramatic action.

=== Tragedy ===
==== Humanist tragedy ====
Humanist tragedy took two distinct directions:

- Biblical tragedy: plots taken from the bible — although close in inspiration to the medieval mystery plays, the humanist biblical tragedy reconceived the biblical characters along classical lines, suppressing both comic elements and the presence of God on the stage. The plots often had clear parallels to contemporary political and religious matters and one finds both Protestant and Catholic playwrights.
- Ancient tragedy: plots taken from mythology or history — they often had clear parallels to contemporary political and religious matters

During the height of the civil wars (1570–1580), a third category of militant theatre emerged, adding to the existing genres of ancient tragedy and comedy. This new form of theater was characterized by its explicit political and religious themes, mirroring the turbulent contemporary context of the time. This article aims to explore and expand upon the development and significance of this militant theatre during the period of civil wars.

Militant theatre of the time was heavily influenced by the prevailing political and religious tensions. Plots were often drawn from mythology or history, presenting narratives that had clear parallels to contemporary political events and religious conflicts. This allowed audiences to connect with the performances on a personal and ideological level.

The plays performed in this category of theater often served as vehicles for political commentary and social critique. They explored themes such as power struggles, the abuse of authority, corruption, religious persecution, and the consequences of war. Through vivid and provocative storytelling, these plays sought to engage and incite audiences, encouraging them to reflect upon the turbulent times in which they lived.

One notable aspect of militant theater was its use of allegory and symbolism. Playwrights employed metaphors and allegorical characters to represent political figures, religious factions, or ideological movements. This veiled approach allowed them to address sensitive topics while avoiding direct censorship or retribution.

The actors and playwrights involved in militant theater faced considerable risks due to the politically charged nature of their work. Censorship, surveillance, and even imprisonment were constant threats. Nevertheless, the appeal and impact of these performances attracted audiences who sought catharsis, validation, and a deeper understanding of the socio-political climate.

While militant theatre during the civil wars was a product of its time, its influence extended beyond the immediate historical context. It laid the groundwork for the development of subsequent forms of political and socially conscious theater, leaving a lasting impact on the theatrical landscape.

===== Contemporary tragedy =====
- Contemporary tragedy: plots taken from recent events

Along with their work as translators and adaptors of plays, the humanists also investigated classical theories of dramatic structure, plot, and characterization. Horace was translated in the 1540s, but had been available throughout the Middle Ages. A complete version of Aristotle's Poetics appeared later (first in 1570 in an Italian version), but his ideas had circulated (in an extremely truncated form) as early as the 13th century in Hermann the German's Latin translation of Averroes' Arabic gloss, and other translations of the Poetics had appeared in the first half of the 16th century; also of importance were the commentaries on Aristotle's poetics by Julius Caesar Scaliger which appeared in the 1560s. The fourth century grammarians Diomedes and Aelius Donatus were also a source of classical theory. The sixteenth century Italians played a central role in the publishing and interpretation of classical dramatic theory, and their works had a major effect on French theatre. Lodovico Castelvetro's Aristote-based Art of Poetry(1570) was one of the first enunciations of the three unities; this work would inform Jean de la Taille's Art de la tragedie (1572). Italian theatre (like the tragedy of Gian Giorgio Trissino) and debates on decorum (like those provoked by Sperone Speroni's play Canace and Giovanni Battista Giraldi's play Orbecche) would also influence the French tradition.

In the same spirit of imitation—and adaptation—of classical sources that had informed the poetic compositions of La Pléiade, French humanist writers recommended that tragedy should be in five acts and have three main characters of noble rank; the play should begin in the middle of the action (in medias res), use noble language and not show scenes of horror on the stage. Some writers (like Lazare de Baïf and Thomas Sébillet) attempted to link the medieval tradition of morality plays and farces to classical theatre, but Joachim du Bellay rejected this claim and elevated classical tragedy and comedy to a higher dignity. Of greater difficulty for the theorists was the incorporation of Aristotle's notion of "catharsis" or the purgation of emotions with Renaissance theatre, which remained profoundly attached to both pleasing the audience and to the rhetorical aim of showing moral examples (exemplum).

Étienne Jodelle's Cléopâtre captive (1553) tells the impassioned fears and doubts of Cleopatra contemplating suicide — has the distinction of being the first original French play to follow Horace's classical precepts on structure (the play is in five acts and respects more or less the unities of time, place and action) and is extremely close to the ancient model: the prologue is introduced by a shade, there is a classical chorus which comments on the action and talks directly to the characters, and the tragic ending is described by a messenger.

Mellin de Saint-Gelais's translation of Gian Giorgio Trissino's La Sophonisbe—the first modern regular tragedy based on ancient models which tells the story of the noble Sophonisba's suicide (rather than be taken as captive by Rome)—was an enormous success at the court when performed in 1556.

Select list of authors and works of humanist tragedy:

- Théodore de Bèze
  - Abraham sacrifiant (1550)
- Étienne Jodelle
  - Cléopâtre captive (1553)
  - Didon se sacrifiant (date unknown)
- Mellin de Saint-Gelais
  - La Sophonisbe (performed 1556) – translation of the Italian play (1524) by Gian Giorgio Trissino
- Jacques Grévin
  - Jules César (1560) – imitated from the Latin of Marc Antoine Muret
- Jean de la Taille
  - Saül, le furieux (1563–1572)
- Robert Garnier
  - Porcie (published 1568, acted in 1573),
  - Cornélie (acted in 1573 and published in 1574)
  - Hippolyte (acted in 1573 and published in 1574)
  - Marc-Antoine (1578)
  - La Troade (1579)
  - Antigone (1580)
  - Les Juives (1583)
- Nicolas de Montreux
  - Tragédie du jeune Cyrus (1581)
  - Isabelle (1594)
  - Cléopâtre (1594)
  - Sophonisbe (1601)

(See the playwrights Antoine de Montchrestien, Alexandre Hardy and Jean de Schelandre for tragedy around 1600–1610.)

=== Comedy ===
Alongside tragedy, European humanists also adapted the ancient comedic tradition and as early as the 15th century, Renaissance Italy had developed a form of humanist Latin comedy. Although the ancients had been less theoretical about the comedic form, the humanists used the precepts of Aelius Donatus (4th century AD), Horace, Aristotle and the works of Terence to elaborate a set of rules: comedy should seek to correct vice by showing the truth; there should be a happy ending; comedy uses a lower style of language than tragedy; comedy does not paint the great events of states and leaders, but the private lives of people, and its principle subject is love.

Although some French authors kept close to the ancient models (Pierre de Ronsard translated a part of Aristophanes's "Plutus" at college), on the whole the French comedic tradition shows a great deal of borrowing from all sources: medieval farce (which continued to be immensely popular throughout the century), the short story, Italian humanist comedies and "La Celestina" (by Fernando de Rojas).

Select list of authors and works of Renaissance comedy:

- Étienne Jodelle
  - L'Eugène (1552) – a comedy in five acts
- Jacques Grévin
  - Les Ébahis (1560)
- Jean Antoine de Baïf
  - L'Eunuque (1565), a version of Terence's Eunuchus
  - Le Brave (1567) – a version of Plautus's Miles gloriosus
- Jean de la Taille
  - Les Corrivaus (published in 1573) – an imitation of Boccaccio and other Italians
- Pierre de Larivey – son of an Italian, Larivey was an important adapter of the Italian comedy.
  - Le Laquais (1579)
  - La Vefve (1579)
  - Les Esprits (1579)
  - Le Morfondu (1579)
  - Les Jaloux (1579)
  - Les Escolliers (1579)
- Odet de Turnèbe
  - Les Contents (1581)
- Nicolas de Montreux
  - La Joyeuse (1581)
  - Joseph le Chaste (?)

In the last decades of the century, four other theatrical modes from Italy — which did not follow the rigid rules of classical theatre – flooded the French stage:

- the Commedia dell'arte – an improvisational theatre of fixed types (Harlequin, Colombo) created in Padua in 1545; Italian troupes were invited in France from 1576 on.
- the Tragicomedy – a theatrical version of the adventurous novel, with lovers, knights, disguises and magic. The most famous of these is Robert Garnier's Bradamante (1580), adapted from Ariosto's Orlando furioso.
- the Pastoral – modeled on Giambattista Guarini's "Pastor fido" ("Faithful Shepard"), Tasso's "Aminta" and Antonio Ongaro "Alceo" (themselves inspired by Jacopo Sannazaro and Jorge de Montemayor). The first French pastorals were short plays performed before a tragedy, but were eventually expanded into five acts. Nicolas de Montreux wrote three pastorals: Athlette (1585), Diane (1592) Arimène ou le berger désespéré (1597).
- the Ballets de cour (Court Ballet) – an allegorical and fantastic mixture of dance and theatre. The most famous of these is the "Ballet comique de la reine" (1581).

By the end of the century, the most influential French playwright—by the range of his styles and by his mastery of the new forms—would be Robert Garnier.

All of these eclectic traditions would continue to evolve in the "baroque" theatre of the early 17th century, before French "classicism" would finally impose itself.

== Early modern theatres and theatrical companies ==
In addition to public theatres, plays were produced in private residences, before the court and in the university. In the first half of the century, the public, the humanist theatre of the colleges and the theatre performed at court showed extremely divergent tastes. For example, while the tragicomedy was fashionable at the court in the first decade, the public was more interested in tragedy.

The early theatres in Paris were often placed in existing structures like tennis courts; their stages were extremely narrow, and facilities for sets and scene changes were often non-existent (this would encourage the development of the unity of place). Eventually, theatres would develop systems of elaborate machines and decors, fashionable for the chevaleresque flights of knights found in the tragicomedies of the first half of the century.

In the early part of the century, the theatre performances took place twice a week starting at two or three o'clock. Theatrical representations often encompassed several works, beginning with a comic prologue, then a tragedy or tragicomedy, then a farce and finally a song. Nobles sometimes sat on the side of the stage during the performance. Given that it was impossible to lower the house lights, the audience was always aware of each other and spectators were notably vocal during performances. The place directly in front of the stage, without seats—the "parterre"—was reserved for men, but being the cheapest tickets, the parterre was usually a mix of social groups. Elegant people watched the show from the galleries. Princes, musketeers and royal pages were given free entry. Before 1630, an honest woman did not go to the theatre.

Unlike England, France placed no restrictions on women performing on stage, but the career of actors of either sex was seen as morally wrong by the Catholic Church (actors were excommunicated) and by the ascetic religious Jansenist movement. Actors typically had fantastic stage names that described typical roles or stereotypical characters.

In addition to scripted comedies and tragedies, Parisians also went to see Italian acting troupes perform Commedia dell'arte, a kind of improvised theatre based on types. The characters from the Commedia dell'arte would have a profound effect on French theatre, and one finds echoes of them in the braggarts, fools, lovers, old men and wily servants that populate French theatre.

Opera came to France in the second half of the century.

The most important theatres and troupes in Paris:

- Hôtel de Bourgogne – until 1629, this theatre was occupied by various troupes, including the ("Comédiens du Roi") directed by Valleran Lecomte and, at his death, by Bellerose (Pierre Le Messier). The troupe became the official "Troupe Royale" in 1629. Actors included: Turlupin, Gros-Guillaume, Gautier-Gargouille, Floridor, Monfleury, Marie Champmeslé.
- Théâtre du Marais (1600–1673) – founded by Charles Le Noir and Montdory, this rival theatre of the Hôtel de Bourgogne housed the troupe "Vieux Comédiens du Roi" around Claude Deschamps and the troupe of Jodelet.
- 'La troupe de Monsieur" – under the protection of Louis XIV's brother Philippe d'Orléans, this was Molière's first Paris troupe. They moved to several theatres in Paris (the Petit-Bourbon, the Palais-Royal) before combining in 1673 with the troupe of the Théâtre du Marais and becoming the troupe of the Hôtel Guénégaud.
- La Comédie française – in 1680 Louis XIV united the Hôtel de Bourgogne and the Hôtel Guénégaud into one official troupe.

Outside of Paris, in the suburbs and in the provinces, there were many wandering theatrical troupes. Molière got his start in such a troupe.

The royal court and other noble houses were also important organizers of theatrical representations, ballets de cour, mock battles and other sorts of "divertissement" for their festivities, and in the some cases the roles of dancers and actors were held by the nobles themselves. The early years at Versailles—before the massive expansion of the residence—were entirely consecrated to such pleasures, and similar spectacles continued throughout the reign. Engravings show Louis XIV and the court seating outside before the "Cour du marbre" of Versailles watching the performance of a play.

The great majority of scripted plays in the seventeenth century were written in verse (notable exceptions include some of Molière's comedies). Except for lyric passages in these plays, the meter used was a twelve-syllable line (the "alexandrine") with a regular pause or "cesura" after the sixth syllable; these lines were put into rhymed couplets; couplets alternated between "feminine" (i.e. ending in a mute e) and "masculine" (i.e. ending in a vowel other than a mute e, or in a consonant or a nasal) rhymes.

== Baroque theatre ==
French theatre from the 17th century is often reduced to three great names—Pierre Corneille, Molière and Jean Racine—and to the triumph of "classicism"; the truth is however far more complicated.

Theatre at the beginning of the century was dominated by the genres and dramatists of the previous generation. Most influential in this respect was Verenice Flores. Although the royal court had grown tired of the tragedy (preferring the more escapist tragicomedy), the theatre going public preferred the former. This would change in the 1630s and 1640s when, influenced by the long baroque novels of the period, the tragicomedy—a heroic and magical adventure of knights and maidens—became the dominant genre. The amazing success of Corneille's "Le Cid" in 1637 and "Horace" in 1640 would bring the tragedy back into fashion, where it would remain for the rest of the century.

The most important source for tragic theatre was Seneca and the precepts of Horace and Aristotle (and modern commentaries by Julius Caesar Scaliger and Lodovico Castelvetro), although plots were taken from classical authors such as Plutarch, Suetonius, etc. and from short story collections (Italian, French and Spanish). The Greek tragic authors (Sophocles, Euripides) would become increasingly important by the middle of the century. Important models for both comedy, tragedy and tragicomedy of the century were also supplied by the Spanish playwrights Pedro Calderón de la Barca, Tirso de Molina and Lope de Vega, many of whose works were translated and adapted for the French stage. Important theatrical models were also supplied by the Italian stage (including the pastoral), and Italy was also an important source for theoretical discussions on theatre, especially with regards to decorum (see for example the debates on Sperone Speroni's play Canace and Giovanni Battista Giraldi's play Orbecche).

Regular comedies (i.e. comedies in five acts modeled on Plautus or Terence and the precepts of Aelius Donatus) were less frequent on the stage than tragedies and tragicomedies at the turn of the century, as the comedic element of the early stage was dominated by the farce, the satirical monologue and by the Italian commedia dell'arte. Jean Rotrou and Pierre Corneille would return to the regular comedy shortly before 1630.

Corneille's tragedies were strangely un-tragic (his first version of "Le Cid" was even listed as a tragicomedy), for they had happy endings. In his theoretical works on theatre, Corneille redefined both comedy and tragedy around the following suppositions:

- The stage—in both comedy and tragedy—should feature noble characters (this would eliminate many low-characters, typical of the farce, from Corneille's comedies). Noble characters should not be depicted as vile (reprehensible actions are generally due to non-noble characters in Corneille's plays).
- Tragedy deals with affairs of the state (wars, dynastic marriages); comedy deals with love. For a work to be tragic, it need not have a tragic ending.
- Although Aristotle says that catharsis (purgation of emotion) should be the goal of tragedy, this is only an ideal. In conformity with the moral codes of the period, plays should not show evil being rewarded or nobility being degraded.

The history of the public and critical reaction to Corneille's "Le Cid" can be found in other articles (he was criticized for his use of sources, for his violation of good taste, and for other irregularities that did not conform to Aristotian or Horacian rules), but its impact was stunning. Cardinal Richelieu asked the newly formed Académie française to investigate and pronounce on the criticisms (it was the Academy's first official judgement), and the controversy reveals a growing attempt to control and regulate theatre and theatrical forms. This would be the beginning of seventeenth century "classicism".

Corneille continued to write plays through 1674 (mainly tragedies, but also something he called "heroic comedies") and many continued to be successes, although the "irregularities" of his theatrical methods were increasingly criticized (notably by François Hédelin, abbé d'Aubignac) and the success of Jean Racine from the late 1660s signaled the end of his preeminence.

Select list of dramatists and plays, with indication of genre (dates are often approximate, as date of publication was usually long after the date of first performance):

- Antoine de Montchrestien (c.1575–1621)
  - Sophonisbe a/k/a La Cathaginoise a/k/a La Liberté (tragedy) – 1596
  - La Reine d'Ecosse a/k/a L'Ecossaise (tragedy) – 1601
  - Aman (tragedy) – 1601
  - La Bergerie (pastoral) – 1601
  - Hector (tragedy) – 1604
- Jean de Schelandre (c. 1585–1635)
  - Tyr et Sidon, ou les funestes amours de Belcar et Méliane (1608)
- Alexandre Hardy (1572-c.1632) – Hardy reputedly wrote 600 plays; only 34 have come down to us.
  - Scédase, ou l'hospitalité violée (tragedy) – 1624
  - La Force du sang (tragicomedy) – 1625 (the plot is taken from a Cervantes short story)
  - Lucrèce, ou l'Adultère puni (tragedy) – 1628
- Honorat de Bueil, seigneur de Racan (1589–1670)
  - Les Bergeries (pastoral) – 1625
- Théophile de Viau (1590–1626)
  - Les Amours tragiques de Pyrame et Thisbé (tragedy) – 1621
- François le Métel de Boisrobert (1592–1662)
  - Didon la chaste ou Les Amours de Hiarbas (tragedy) – 1642
- Jean Mairet (1604–1686)
  - La Sylve (pastoral tragicomedy) – c.1626
  - La Silvanire, ou La Morte vive (pastoral tragicomedy) – 1630
  - Les Galanteries du Duc d'Ossonne Vice-Roi de Naples (comedy) – 1632
  - La Sophonisbe (tragedy) – 1634
  - La Virginie (tragicomedy) – 1636
- François Tristan l'Hermite (1601–1655)
  - Mariamne (tragedy) – 1636
  - Penthée (tragedy) – 1637
  - La Mort de Seneque (tragedy) – 1644
  - La Mort de Crispe (tragedy) – 1645
  - The Parasite – 1653
- Jean Rotrou (1609–1650)
  - La Bague de l'oubli (comedy) – 1629
  - La Belle Alphrède (comedy) – 1639
  - Laure persécutée (tragicomedy) – 1637
  - Le Véritable saint Genest (tragedy) – 1645
  - Venceslas (tragicomedy) – 1647
  - Cosroès (tragedy) – 1648
- Pierre Corneille (1606–1684)
  - Mélite (comedy) – 1629
  - Clitandre (tragicomedy, later changed to tragedy) – 1631
  - La Veuve (comedy) – 1631
  - La Place Royale (comedy) – 1633
  - Médée (tragedy) – 1635
  - L'Illusion comique (comedy) – 1636
  - Le Cid (tragicomedy, later changed to tragedy) – 1637
  - Horace (tragedy) – 1640
  - Cinna (tragedy) – 1640
  - Polyeucte ("Christian" tragedy) – c.1641
  - La Mort de Pompée (tragedy) – 1642
  - Le Menteur (comedy) – 1643
  - Rodogune, princesse des Parthes (tragedy) – 1644
  - Héraclius, empereur d'Orient (tragedy) – 1647
  - Don Sanche d'Aragon ("heroic" comedy) – 1649
  - Nicomède (tragedy) – 1650
  - Sertorius (tragedy) – 1662
  - Sophonisbe (tragedy) – 1663
  - Othon (tragedy) – 1664
  - Tite et Bérénice ("heroic" comedy) – 1670
  - Suréna, général des Parthes (tragedy) – 1674
- Pierre du Ryer (1606–1658)
  - Lucrèce (tragedy) – 1636
  - Alcione – 1638
  - Scévola (tragedy) – 1644
- Jean Desmarets (1595–1676)
  - Les Visionnaires (comedy) – 1637
  - Erigone (prose tragedy) – 1638
  - Scipion (verse tragedy) – 1639
- François Hédelin, abbé d'Aubignac (1604–1676)
  - La Cyminde – 1642
  - La Pucelle d'Orléans – 1642
  - Zénobie (tragedy) – 1647, written with the intention of affording a model in which the strict rules of the drama were served.
  - Le Martyre de Sainte Catherine (tragedy) – 1650
- Paul Scarron (1610–1660)
  - Jodelet – 1645
  - Don Japhel d'Arménie – 1653
- Isaac de Benserade (c.1613–1691)
  - Cléopâtre (tragedy) – 1635
- Samuel Chappuzeau – 1625 – 1701
  - Le Cercle des femmes ou le Secret du Lit Nuptial 1656 (Comedy, prose)
  - Damon et Pythias, ou le Triomphe de l'Amour et de l'Amitié (tragi-comedy) 1657
  - Armetzar ou les Amis ennemis (tragi-comedy) 1658
  - Le Riche mécontent ou le noble imaginaire (Comedy)1660
  - L'Académie des Femmes, (Farce, in verse) Paris, 1661
  - Le Colin-Maillard (Farce, Comedie Facetieuse), Paris, 1662
  - L'Avare duppé, ou l'Homme de paille, (comedy) Paris, 1663
  - Les Eaux de Pirmont – 1669

== 17th-century classicism ==
The expression classicism as it applies to literature implies notions of order, clarity, moral purpose and good taste. Many of these notions are directly inspired by the works of Aristotle and Horace and by classical Greek and Roman masterpieces.

In French classical theatre (also called French classicism), a play should follow the Three Unities:

- Unity of place: the setting should not change. In practice, this led to the frequent "Castle, interior". Battles take place off stage.
- Unity of time: ideally the entire play should take place in 24 hours.
- Unity of action: there should be one central story and all secondary plots should be linked to it.

Although based on classical examples, the unities of place and time were seen as essential for the spectator's complete absorption into the dramatic action; wildly dispersed scenes in China or Africa, or over many years would—critics maintained—break the theatrical illusion. Sometimes grouped with the unity of action is the notion that no character should appear unexpectedly late in the drama.

Linked with the theatrical unities are the following concepts:

- "Les bienséances": literature should respect moral codes and good taste; nothing should be presented that flouts these codes, even if they are historical events.
- "La vraisemblance": actions should be believable. When historical events contradict believability, some critics counselled the latter. The criterion of believability was sometimes also used to criticize soliloquy, and in late classical plays characters are almost invariably supplied with confidents (valets, friends, nurses) to whom they reveal their emotions.

These rules precluded many elements common in the baroque "tragi-comedy": flying horses, chivalric battles, magical trips to foreign lands and the deus ex machina. The mauling of Hippolyte by a monster in Phèdre could only take place offstage.

- Finally, literature and art should consciously follow Horace's precept "to please and educate" ("aut delectare aut prodesse est").

These "rules" or "codes" were seldom completely followed, and many of the century's masterpieces broke these rules intentionally to heighten emotional effect:

- Corneille's "Le Cid" was criticised for having Rodrigue appear before Chimène after having killed her father, a violation of moral codes.

== Theatre under Louis XIV ==
By the 1660s, classicism had finally imposed itself on French theatre. The key theoretical work on theatre from this period was François Hedelin, abbé d'Aubignac's "Pratique du théâtre" (1657), and the dictates of this work reveal to what degree "French classicism" was willing to modify the rules of classical tragedy to maintain the unities and decorum (d'Aubignac for example saw the tragedies of Oedipus and Antigone as unsuitable for the contemporary stage).

Although Pierre Corneille continued to produce tragedies to the end of his life, the works of Jean Racine from the late 1660s on totally eclipsed the late plays of the elder dramatist. Racine's tragedies—inspired by Greek myths, Euripides, Sophocles and Seneca—condensed their plot into a tight set of passionate and duty-bound conflicts between a small group of noble characters, and concentrated on these characters' double-binds and the geometry of their unfulfilled desires and hatreds. Racine's poetic skill was in the representation of pathos and amorous passion (like Phèdre's love for her stepson) and his impact was such that emotional crisis would be the dominant mode of tragedy to the end of the century. Racine's two late plays ("Esther" and "Athalie") opened new doors to biblical subject matter and to the use of theatre in the education of young women.

Tragedy in the last two decades of the century and the first years of the eighteenth century was dominated by productions of classics from Pierre Corneille and Racine, but on the whole the public's enthusiasm for tragedy had greatly diminished: theatrical tragedy paled beside the dark economic and demographic problems at the end of the century and the "comedy of manners" (see below) had incorporated many of the moral goals of tragedy. Other later century tragedians include: Claude Boyer, Michel Le Clerc, Jacques Pradon, Jean Galbert de Campistron, Jean de La Chapelle, Antoine d'Aubigny de la Fosse, l'abbé Charles-Claude Geneste, Prosper Jolyot de Crébillon. At the end of the century, in the plays of Crébillon in particular, there occasionally appeared a return to the theatricality of the beginning of the century: multiple episodes, extravagant fear and pity, and the representation of gruesome actions on the stage.

Early French opera was particularly popular with the royal court in this period, and the composer Jean-Baptiste Lully was extremely prolific (see the composer's article for more on court ballets and opera in this period). These musical works carried on in the tradition of tragicomedy (especially the "pièces à machines") and court ballet, and also occasionally presented tragic plots (or "tragédies en musique"). The dramatists that worked with Lully included Pierre Corneille and Molière, but the most important of these librettists was Philippe Quinault, a writer of comedies, tragedies, and tragicomedies.

Comedy in the second half of the century was dominated by Molière. A veteran actor, master of farce, slapstick, the Italian and Spanish theatre (see above), and "regular" theatre modeled on Plautus and Terence, Molière's output was large and varied. He is credited with giving the French "comedy of manners" ("comédie de mœurs") and the "comedy of character ("comédie de caractère") their modern form. His hilarious satires of avaricious fathers, "précieuses", social parvenues, doctors and pompous literary types were extremely successful, but his comedies on religious hypocrisy ("Tartuffe") and libertinage ("Don Juan") brought him much criticism from the church, and "Tartuffe" was only performed through the intervention of the king. Many of Molière's comedies, like "Tartuffe", "Don Juan" and the "Le Misanthrope" could veer between farce and the darkest of dramas, and the endings of "Don Juan" and the "Misanthrope" are far from being purely comic.

Comedy would continue to the end of the century on the paths traced by Molière: the satire of contemporary morals and manners, and the "regular" comedy would dominate. The last great "comedy" of Louis XIV's reign, Alain-René Lesage's "Turcaret", is an immensely dark play in which almost no character shows redeeming traits.

Select list of French plays after 1659:

- Molière (pseudonym of Jean-Baptiste Poquelin) (1622–1673)
  - Les précieuses ridicules (comedy) – 1659
  - L'Ecole des femmes (comedy) – 1662
  - Tartuffe ou L'Imposteur (comedy) – 1664
  - Don Juan ou Le festin de pierre (comedy) – 1665
  - Le Misanthrope (comedy) – 1666
  - L'Avare (comedy) – 1668
  - Le Bourgeois gentilhomme (comedy) – 1670
  - Les Fourberies de Scapin (comedy) – 1671
  - Les Femmes savantes (comedy) – 1672
  - Le Malade imaginaire (comedy) – 1673
- Thomas Corneille (1625–1709) – brother of Pierre Corneille
  - Timocrate (tragedy) – 1659, the longest run (80 nights) recorded of any play in the century
  - Ariane (tragedy) – 1672
  - Circée (tragicomedy) – 1675 (cowritten with Donneau de Visé)
  - La Devineresse (comedy) – 1679 (cowritten with Donneau de Visé)
  - Bellérophon (opéra) – 1679
- Philippe Quinault (1635–1688).
  - Alceste (musical tragedy) – 1674
  - Proserpine (musical tragedy) – 1680
  - Amadis de Gaule (musical tragicomedy) – 1684, based on the Renaissance chivalric novel
  - Armide (musical tragicomedy) – 1686, based on Tasso's Jerusalem Delivered
- Jean Racine (1639–1699)
  - Andromaque (tragedy) – 1667
  - Les Plaideurs (comedy) – 1668, Racine's only comedy
  - Bérénice (tragedy) – 1670
  - Bajazet (tragedy) – 1672
  - Iphigénie (tragedy) – 1674
  - Phèdre (tragedy) – 1677
  - Britannicus (tragedy) – 1689
  - Esther (tragedy) – 1689
  - Athalie (tragedy) – 1691
- Jacques Pradon (1632–1698)
  - Pyrame et Thisbé (tragedy) – 1674
  - Tamerlan, ou la mort de Bajazet (tragedy) – 1676
  - Phèdre et Hippolyte (tragedy) – 1677, this play, released at the same time as Racine's, had a momentary success
- Jean-François Regnard (1655–1709)
  - Le Joueur (comedy) – 1696
  - Le Distrait (comedy) – 1697
- Jean Galbert de Campistron (1656–1723)
  - Andronic (tragedy) – 1685
  - Tiridate (tragedy) – 1691
- Florent Carton Dancourt (1661–1725)
  - Le Chevalier à la mode (comedy) – 1687
  - Les Bourgeoises à la mode (comedy) – 1693
  - Les Bourgeoises de qualité (comedy) – 1700
- Alain-René Lesage (1668–1747)
  - Turcaret (comedy) – 1708
- Prosper Jolyot de Crébillon (1674–1762)
  - Idoménée (tragedy) – 1705
  - Atrée et Thyeste (tragedy) – 1707
  - Electre (tragedy) – 1709
  - Rhadamiste et Zénobie (tragedy) – 1711
  - Xerxes (tragedy) – 1714
  - Sémiramis (tragedy) – 1717

== 18th century ==
The 18th century French theatre flourished with influential playwrights such as Voltaire, known for works such as Œdipe (1718) and Zaïre (1732), and Marivaux, whose comedies explored the complexities of love, while Denis Diderot introduced the Bourgeois tragedy, and Beaumarchais revolutionized comedy with Le Barbier de Séville (1775) and Le Mariage de Figaro (1778); meanwhile, Jean-Jacques Rousseau critiqued theatre's role in society in his Letter to M. D'Alembert on Spectacles, contributing to a rich discourse that intertwined politics, philosophy, and dramatic arts.

Select list of French plays in the 18th century:

- Voltaire
  - Œdipe (1718)
  - Mariamne (1724)
  - Éryphile (1732)
  - Zaïre (1732)
  - Mahomet (1741)
  - Mérope (1743)
  - La princesse de Navarre (1745)
  - Nanine (1749)
  - L'Orphelin de la Chine (1755)
- Beaumarchais
  - Eugénie (1767)
  - Les Deux amis (1770)
  - Tarare (1787)
  - Le Barbier de Séville ou la Précaution inutile (1775)
  - La folle journée ou Le Mariage de Figaro (1778)
  - L'autre Tartuffe ou La Mère coupable (1792)
- Marivaux
- Denis Diderot
- Jean-Baptiste-Louis Gresset (Le Méchant)
- Jean-François Regnard

== 19th century ==
The major battle of romanticism in France was fought in the theatre, but was not against the theatre. The early years of the century were marked by a revival of classicism and classical-inspired tragedies, often with themes of national sacrifice or patriotic heroism in keeping with the spirit of the Revolution, but the production of Victor Hugo's Hernani in 1830 marked the triumph of the romantic movement on the stage (a description of the turbulent opening night can be found in Théophile Gautier). The dramatic unities of time and place were abolished, tragic and comic elements appeared together and metrical freedom was won. Marked by the plays of Friedrich Schiller, the romantics often chose subjects from historic periods (the French Renaissance, the reign of Louis XIII) and doomed noble characters (rebel princes and outlaws) or misunderstood artists (Vigny's play based on the life of Thomas Chatterton).

By the middle of the century, theatre began to reflect more and more a realistic tendency, associated with Naturalism. These tendencies can be seen in the theatrical melodramas of the period and, in an even more lurid and gruesome light, in the Grand Guignol at the end of the century. In addition to melodramas, popular and bourgeois theatre in the mid-century turned to realism in the "well-made" bourgeois farces of Eugène Marin Labiche and the moral dramas of Émile Augier. Also popular were the operettas, farces and comedies of Ludovic Halévy, Henri Meilhac, and, at the turn of the century, Georges Feydeau. Before the war, the most successful play was Octave Mirbeau's great comedy Les affaires sont les affaires ("Business Is Business") (1903).

The poetry of Baudelaire and much of the literature in the latter half of the century (or "fin de siècle") were often characterized as "decadent" for their lurid content or moral vision, but with the publication of Jean Moréas "Symbolist Manifesto" in 1886, it was the term symbolism which was most often applied to the new literary environment. Symbolism appeared in theatre in the works of writers Villiers de l'Isle-Adam and Maurice Maeterlinck among others.

== 20th century ==
The most significant dramatist of turn of the century France was Alfred Jarry. The impact of his plays, primarily Ubu Roi, was writ large upon contemporary audiences and has continued to be a major influence on, among others, Monty Python's Flying Circus and The Young Ones.

Avant-garde theatre in France after World War I was profoundly marked by Dada and Surrealism. The Surrealist movement was a major force in experimental writing and the international art world until the Second World War, and the surrealists' technique was particularly well-suited for poetry and theatre, most notably in the theatrical works of Antonin Artaud and Guillaume Apollinaire.

Theatre in the 1920s and 1930s went through further changes in a loose association of theatres (called the "Cartel") around the directors and producers Louis Jouvet, Charles Dullin, Gaston Baty, and Ludmila and Georges Pitoëff. They produced French works by Jean Giraudoux, Jules Romains, Jean Anouilh and Jean-Paul Sartre, as well as Greek and Shakespearean plays and works by Luigi Pirandello, Anton Chekhov, and George Bernard Shaw.

Inspired by the theatrical experiments in the early half of the century and by the horrors of the war, the avant-garde Parisian theatre, "New theatre"—termed the "Theatre of the Absurd" by critic Martin Esslin in reference to Eugène Ionesco, Samuel Beckett, Jean Genet, Arthur Adamov, Fernando Arrabal—refused simple explanations and abandoned traditional characters, plots and staging. Other experiments in theatre involved decentralisation, regional theatre, "popular theatre" (designed to bring the working class to the theatre), Brechtian theatre (largely unknown in France before 1954), and the productions of Arthur Adamov and Roger Planchon. The Avignon festival was started in 1947 by Jean Vilar, who was also important in the creation of the "Théâtre national populaire" or T.N.P.

The events of May 1968 marked a watershed in the development of a radical ideology of revolutionary change in education, class, family and literature. In theatre, the conception of "création collective" developed by Ariane Mnouchkine's Théâtre du Soleil refused division into writers, actors and producers: the goal was for total collaboration, for multiple points of view, for an elimination of separation between actors and the public, and for the audience to seek out their own truth.

== See also ==
- Category:French dramatists and playwrights
- Category:French plays
- Molière Award — the national theatre award of France that recognises achievement of French theatre each year.
