= Collège de Boncourt =

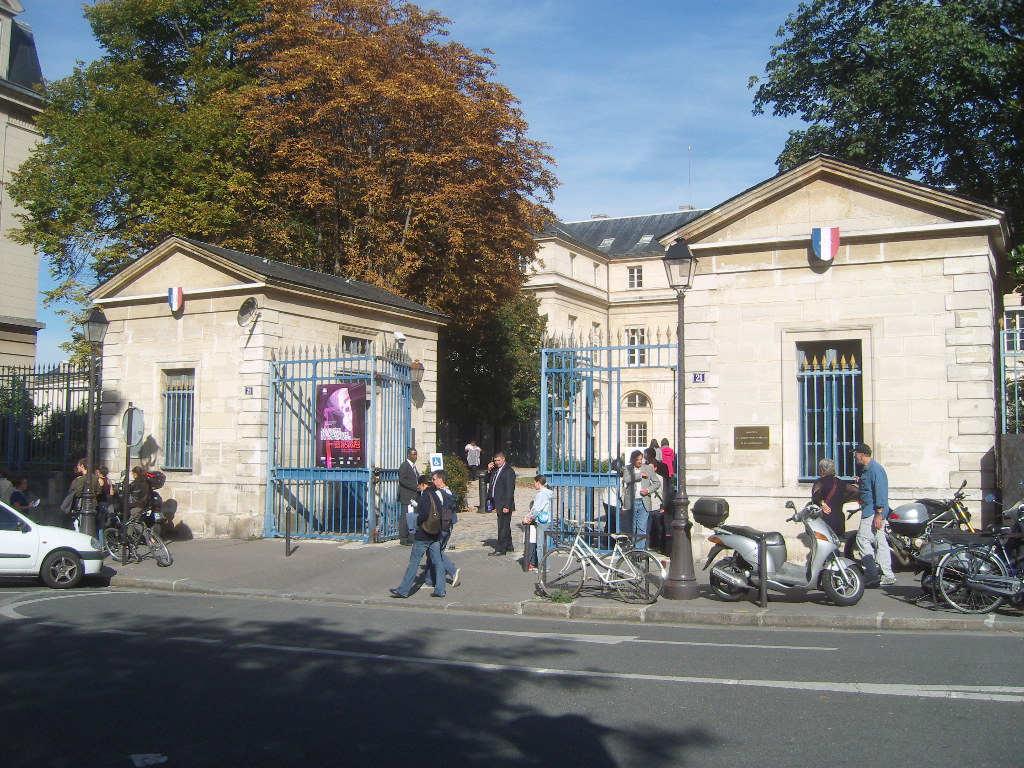
Entrance pavilions to the collège de Boncourt, rue Descartes, head-office of the current Secrétariat d'État chargé de l'Enseignement supérieur et de la Recherche.

The Collège de Boncourt (French pronunciation: [kɔlɛʒ də bɔ̃kuʁ]), in the (now) 5th arrondissement of Paris, rue Bordet or Bordeille (modern rue Descartes), was established in 1353 by Pierre Becoud (which became "Boncourt" by alteration)

== History ==
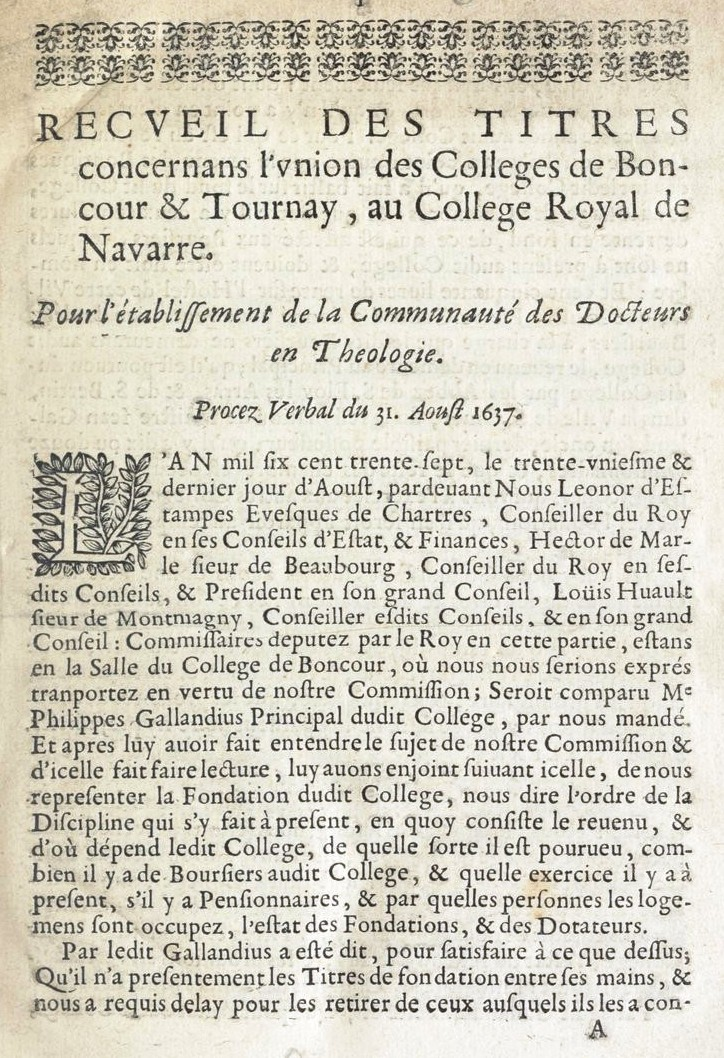
Collection of titles for the union of the Collége de Boncourt and the Collège de Tournai into the Collège royal de Navarre (1637).

During the 16th century, comedies and tragedies were often performed on the site, particularly Cléopâtre captive, a tragedy by Étienne Jodelle. Marc-Antoine Muret taught in the college. Jacques Grévin was a student here as well as Etienne Jodelle, Jean Bastier de La Péruse, Jean de La Taille and André de Rivaudeau.

The college was once completely refurbished in 1688 by Pierre Galand, its principal. It was attached to the College de Navarre. Then, from 1738, a new pavilion took the place of the old college. From 1804 to 1976, the building housed the offices of the École Polytechnique, then those of the Ministry of Higher Education and Research.

== Bibliography ==
- Henri Chamart, "Le Collège de Boncourt et les origines du théâtre classique", Mélanges offerts à M. Abel Lefranc, Paris, Droz, 1936, p. 246-260.
- Recueil des titres concernans l'union des collèges de Boncour et Tournay au collège royal de Navarre. Procez verbal du 31 aoust 1637. Read on line.
