= Jean Daurat =

French poet and scholar (1508–1588)

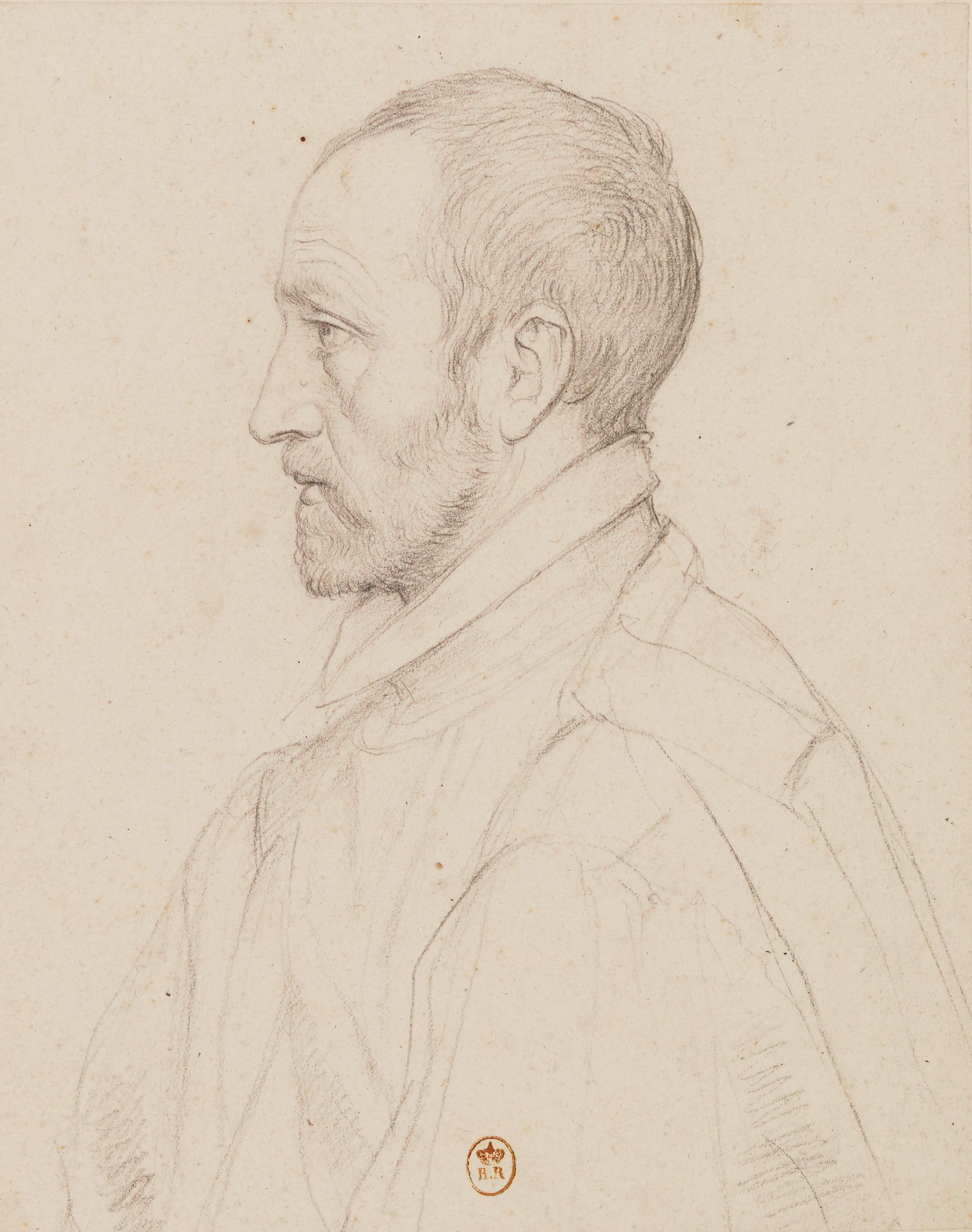
Early modern period portrait

Jean Daurat ([ʒɑ̃ doʁa], Occitan: Joan Dorat, Latin: Auratus; 3 April 1508 – 1 November 1588) was a French poet, scholar and a member of a group known as The Pléiade.

== Early life ==
He was born Joan Dinemandy in Limoges and was a member of a noble family. After studying at the College of Limoges, he came to Paris to be presented to King Francis I of France, who made him tutor to his pages. He rapidly gained an immense reputation as a classical scholar.

== Career ==
As a private tutor in the house of Lazare de Baif, he had Jean-Antoine de Baif for his pupil. His son, Louis, showed great precocity and at the age of ten, translated into French verse one of his father's Latin pieces. His poems were published with his father's.

Daurat became director of the Collège de Coqueret, where he had among his pupils Antoine de Baif, Pierre de Ronsard, Remy Belleau, and Pontus de Tyard. Joachim du Bellay was added by Ronsard to this group, and these five young poets, under the direction of Daurat, formed a society for the reformation of the French language and literature. They increased their number to seven by the initiation of the dramatist Étienne Jodelle, and thereupon they named themselves La Pléiade, in emulation of the seven Greek poets of Alexandria. The election of Daurat as their leader proved his personal influence, and the value his pupils set on the learning to which he introduced them, but as a writer of French verse he is the least important of the seven. Meanwhile, he collected around him a sort of academy, and encouraged the students in a passionate study of Greek and Latin poetry. He himself wrote incessantly in both those languages, and was styled "the modern Pindar". His influence extended beyond the bounds of his own country, and he was famous as a scholar in England, Italy, and Germany.

In 1556 he was appointed professor of Greek at the Collège Royal. In 1567, he resigned the post in favour of his nephew, Nicolas Goulu. King Charles IX gave him the title of poeta regius ("the king's poet"). His prolific output was the wonder of his time; he is said to have composed more than 15,000 Greek and Latin verses. The best of these he published at Paris in 1586. He died at Paris, having survived all his illustrious pupils of the Pléiade, except Pontus de Tyard. The Œuvres poétiques in the vernacular of Jean Daurat were edited in 1875 with biographical notice and bibliography by Charles Marty-Laveaux in his Pléiade française.

Daurat has been credited with the development of the claque in the French theatre, in which professional applauders are paid to ensure the success of (or in other cases, booed to ensure the failure of) certain plays, playwrights, and actors.

== Scholarship ==
Daurat is described by Eduard Fraenkel as "the true initiator of the study of Greek poetry in France". His pupils, including Joseph Justus Scaliger, were responsible for circulating the numerous textual conjectures made by Daurat, especially in Aeschylus' Agamemnon, which Daurat himself left unpublished.

He wrote an allegory for Julián Íñiguez de Medrano, which was featured in Medrano's La Silva Curiosa, published in 1583 in Paris.
