= Jean Bastier de La Péruse =

French poet and playwright

Jean Bastier de La Péruse (1529–1554) was a 16th-century French poet and playwright.

He was born at Pont-Sigoulant, parish of Roumazières, but he took the name of the neighboring parish, la Péruse. He studied in Paris, at collège de Boncourt, where he attended the lessons by Marc-Antoine Muret and George Buchanan, and became a member of the first Pléiade, with Ronsard, Du Bellay, Baïf, Jodelle, Pontus de Tyard and Peletier du Mans. According to Étienne Pasquier, he played in the presentations of Cléopâtre captive and L'Eugène by Étienne Jodelle (1553). The performance took place in the hôtel de Reims in Paris in the presence of Henri II and Diane de Poitiers.

He composed a tragedy Médée, inspired by Seneca and Euripides. He was quickly nicknamed "the French Euripides" by Charles de Sainte-Marthe. Jean Bastier left Paris soon after and settled in Poitiers.

The favorite themes of his poems are love and literary immortality.

He died aged 25, probably from plague.

His friend Ronsard paid tribute by dedicating him this poem:

Tu dois bien à ce coup, chétive tragédie
Laisser tes graves jeux
Laisser ta scène vide contre toi hardie
Et de la même voix dont tu aigris les princes
Tombés en déconfort
Tu dois bien annoncer aux étranges provinces
Que la Péruse est mort.

== Publications ==
- La Médée, tragédie et autres diverses poésies (1555) Text online
- Les Œuvres de J. de La Péruse avec quelques autres diverses poésies de Cl. Binet (1573)
- Diverses poésies de feu J. de La Péruse (1613)

Modern editions

- Œuvres poétiques de Jean Bastier de La Péruse, 1529-1554 (1867). Reprint: Éditions Slatkine, Genava, 1969.
- La Médée édition critique par James A. Coleman, University of Exeter, collection « Textes littéraires », 1985.
- « Médée », texte édité et présenté par Michel Dassonville, in La Tragédie à l’époque d’Henri II et de Charles IX, Enea Balmas et Michel Dassonville (dir.), Florence, Leo S. Olschki – Paris, P.U.F., « Théâtre français de la Renaissance », vol. 1, 1989, p. 119-173
- Médée, édition, introduction et notes de Marie-Madeleine Fragonard, étude des sources par James C. Coleman, Mugron, Éditions José Feijóo, « Collection texte », 1990.

== See also ==
- French Renaissance literature
