= De La Taille =

De La Taille is a surname, and may refer to:

- Emmanuel de La Taille (1932–2021), French journalist and television producer
- Jean de La Taille (1540–1607), French poet
- Maurice de la Taille (1872–1933), French Catholic priest and author
