= François de Chantelouve =

French poet and playwright

François de Chantelouve (François de Grossombre) was a 16th-century French poet and playwright.

A committed catholic, he wrote a tragedy on the assassination of admiral Coligny : Tragedie de feu Gaspard de Coligny (1575). He also composed a biblical tragedy, Pharaon (1577).

== Bibliography ==
La Tragedie de feu Gaspard de Coligny, édition Keith Cameron, Université d'Exeter, 1971, Textes littéraires nº 3

== See also ==
- French Renaissance literature
