= Robert Garnier =

French poet and dramatist (c. 1545 - c. 1590)

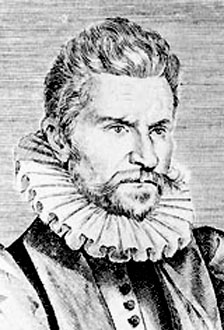
- Born: c. 1545; La Ferté-Bernard, Pays de la Loire, France
- Died: c. 1590 (aged c. 45); Le Mans, Pays de la Loire, France
- Resting place: Chapelle du cimetière du Luart
- Education: University of Toulouse
- Occupations: Playwright; poet
- Writing career
- Language: Early Modern French
- Period: Before 1568 – 1590
- Movement: French Renaissance

Robert Garnier (c. 1545 - c. 1590) was a French poet and playwright. His plays are considered the pinnacle of french tragedy during the Renaissance. Strongly marked with echoes of the Wars of Religion, these works exerted a great influence in their time, particularly in the English Renaissance theatre.

== Biography ==
He published his first work while still a law student at the University of Toulouse, where he won a prize (1565) in the Académie des Jeux Floraux. It was a collection of lyrical pieces, now lost, entitled Plaintes amoureuses de Robert Garnier (1565). After some legal practice at the Parisian bar, he became conseiller du roi au siège présidial and sénéchaussée of Le Maine, his native district, and later lieutenant-général criminel. His friend Lacroix du Maine says that he enjoyed a great reputation as an orator. He was a distinguished magistrate, of considerable weight in his native province, who gave his leisure to literature, and whose merits as a poet were fully recognized by his own generation.

In his early plays he was a close follower of the school of dramatists who were inspired by the study of Seneca. In these productions there is little that is strictly dramatic except the form. A tragedy was a series of rhetorical speeches relieved by a lyric chorus. His pieces in this manner are Porcie (published 1568, acted at the Hôtel de Bourgogne in 1573), Cornélie and Hippolyte (both acted in 1573 and printed in 1574). In Porcie the deaths of Cassius, Brutus and Porcia are each the subject of an eloquent recital, but the action is confined to the death of the nurse, who alone is allowed to die on the stage. His next group of tragedies Marc-Antoine (1578), La Troade (1579), Antigone ou la Piété (acted and printed 1580) shows an advance on the theatre of Étienne Jodelle and Jacques Grévin, and on his own early plays, in so much that the rhetorical element is accompanied by abundance of action, though this is accomplished by the plan of joining together two virtually independent pieces in the same way. In 1592, The Countess of Pembroke wrote The Tragedy of Antonie, an English version of Garnier's play.

In 1582 and 1583 he produced his two masterpieces Bradamante and Les Juives. In Bradamante, which alone of his plays has no chorus, he cut himself adrift from Senecan models, and sought his subject in Ariosto, the result being what came to be known later as a tragicomedy. The dramatic and romantic story becomes a real drama in Garnier's hands, though even there the lovers, Bradamante and Roger, never meet on the stage. The contest in the mind of Roger supplies a genuine dramatic interest in the manner of Corneille.

Les Juives is the moving story of the barbarous vengeance of Nebuchadnezzar on the Jewish king Zedekiah and his children. The Jewish women lamenting the fate of their children take a principal part in this tragedy, which, although almost entirely elegiac in conception, is singularly well designed, and gains unity by the personality of the prophet. (The critic M. Faguet says that of all French tragedies of the 16th and 17th centuries it is, with Athalie, the best constructed with regard to the requirements of the stage. Actual representation is continually in the mind of the author; his drama is, in fact, visually conceived.)

Gamier must be regarded as the greatest French tragic poet of the Renaissance and the precursor of the baroque theater of the 17th century. He exercised a major influence on the development of Elizabethan tragedy. Thomas Kyd is the likely author of an English translation of Cornélie published in England in the early 1590s.

== Plays ==
- Porcie, tragedy, Paris, Robert Estienne, 1568 (éd. J.-C. Ternaux, Paris, Champion, 1999)
- Hippolyte, tragedy, Paris, Robert Estienne, 1573 (éd. R. Lebègue, Paris, Les Belles Lettres, 1949 et J.-D. Beaudin, Paris, Garnier, 2009)
- Cornélie, tragedy, Paris, Robert Estienne, 1574 (éd. J.-C. Ternaux, Paris, Champion, 2002)
- Marc-Antoine, tragedy, Paris, M. Patisson, 1578 (éd. J.-C. Ternaux, Paris, Garnier, 2010)
- La Troade, tragedy, Paris, M. Patisson, 1579 (éd. J.-D. Beaudin, Paris, Champion, 1999)
- Antigone ou la Piété, tragedy, Paris, M. Patisson, 1580 (éd. J.-D. Beaudin, Paris, Champion, 1997)
- Bradamante, tragicomedy, Paris, M. Patisson, 1582
- Les Juives, tragedy, Paris, M. Patisson, 1583 (éd. par S. Lardon, Paris, Champion, 1999; éd. Michel Jeanneret, Gallimard, Folio- Théâtre, 2007)
