= Pierre Mainfray =

French poet and playwright

Pierre Mainfray (Rouen, 1580 – 1630) was a 17th-century French poet and playwright.

All that is known of him, writes Pierre Larousse, is that he was the precursor, almost ignored, of his illustrious compatriot Pierre Corneille: "All Mainfray's plays have the defects we remark in those of the time. Only Cyrus has some interest. Only two of them, Hercules and Cyrus were presented".

Gustave Le Vavasseur adds: "In 1616, Pierre Mainfray, from Rouen, had his first play entitled les Forces incomparables et Amours du grand Hercules printed followed by Cyrus triomphant, la Rodanienne and la Chasse royale. Nothing remarkable in these plays if not the division into four acts of the first and the last, and his Shakespearean ignorance of geography which makes him lay siege to Rhodes by land."

== Works ==
=== Theatre ===
- 1612: La Belle Hester, tragédie française tirée de la Sainte Bible
- 1616: Les Forces incomparables et Amours du grand Hercules, four-act tragedy, in verse, où l'on voit artistement dépeints sa générosité, son trépas et son immortalité malgré l'envie de Junon, sa marâtre.Text online
- 1618: Cyrus triomphant, ou la Fureur d'Astiages, roy de Mède, five-act tragedy, with choirs, dedicated to the city of Rouen.Text online
- 1621: La Rhodienne, ou la Cruauté de Soliman, five-act tragedy, in verse, où l'on voit naïvement décrites les infortunes amoureuses d'Éraste et de Perside.Text online
- 1625: La Chasse royale, four-act comedy, où l'on voit le contentement et l'exercice de la chasse des cerfs, des sangliers et des ours; ensemble la subtilité dont usa une chasseresse vers un satyre qui la poursuivait d'amour

=== Poetry ===
- 1621: Regrets funèbres sur le trépas de Messire Charles Maignard, conseiller du Roy et président en sa cour de Parlement de Normandie,
- 1621: Épistre consolatoire à Mme la présidente, veuve de feu M. de Bernière, avec l'ordre tenu et observé aux funérailles de feu Messire Charles Maignard, 1621
- La Triomphante Vie, et Martyre, de Mgr S. Pierre, prince des apôtres et Mgr S. Paul, docteur des Gentils, avec l'histoire de la translation de l'oratoire de Notre Dame de Lorette et plusieurs chansons spirituelles traitant du voyage de Rome et autres à la louange S. Pierre, S. Paul et Notre Dame de Lorette, avec la guide du chemin de Rome et Notre Dame de Lorette, le plus court et le plus usité, s. d.
- Les Fleurs des muses françaises consacrées à Mgr l'illustrissime et révérendissime archevêque de Rouen, s. d.
