= Cléopâtre captive =

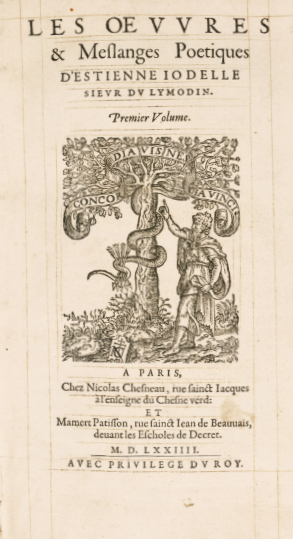
Les Œuvres et meslanges poetiques d’Estienne Jodelle Sieur du Lymodin (1574)

Cléopâtre captive (French pronunciation: [kleɔpatʁ kaptiv]) is a five-act tragedy by Étienne Jodelle, presented on 9 February 1553, first before the King Henri II of France in the Hôtel de Reims, then at the Collège de Boncourt. The play is part of the posthumous collection Les Œuvres et meslanges poetiques d'Estienne Jodelle Sieur du Lymodin (1574). Remy Belleau played the role of Cleopatra, Jean Bastier de La Péruse, that of Octavian. It was the first "tragédie humaniste", and Jodelle composed it in parallel with the first "humanist comedy", L'Eugène.

The performance was a success, and was followed by a celebration in the antique manner in Arcueil, bringing together all participants and friends for a party known as the Pompe du bouc.

== Summary ==
- Act 1 : Antony's shadow announces to Cleopatra that she must die.
- Act 2 : Octavian fears that Cleopatra will commit suicide.
- Act 3 : Cleopatra seeks to commiserate Octavian, offering him riches. Seleucus the servant reveals that she hides part.
- Act 4 : Cleopatra decides to die.
- Act 5 : Proculus narrates to Octavian the death of the Queen.

== Cast ==
Actors who created the roles
Part	Actor or actress
Cleopatra	Etienne Jodelle
Octavian	La Péruse

== Style ==
Jodelle was the first to use alexandrines in a tragedy (acts I and IV), but he also resorted to decasyllables (acts II, III, V). In the choirs, he resorted to various meters: some verse have only three syllables.

The subject is taken from Plutarch (Life of Antony). The action is reduced: the play tells the decision to die taken by Cleopatra and its implementation.

== Bibliography ==
- Cléopâtre captive on wikisource
- F. Charpentier, « Invention d'une dramaturgie : Jodelle, La Péruse », Littératures, speing 1990, (p. 7-22).
- Fr. Cornilliat, "'Mais que dirai-je à César?' Eloge et tragédie dans la poétique d'E. Jodelle", L'éloge du Prince de l'Antiquité aux Lumières, I. Cogitore, Fr. Goyet, Grenoble, PU, 2003, (p. 223-250)
- Chr. Reidenbach, "Arbeit am Stein. Verfahren sprachlicher Monumentalisierung in Étienne Jodelles Cléopâtre captive (1553)", in: Zeitsprünge. Forschungen zur Frühen Neuzeit 27 (2023), p. 455–493, doi.org/10.3196/2751515x23273491.
