= Rémy Belleau =

French writer

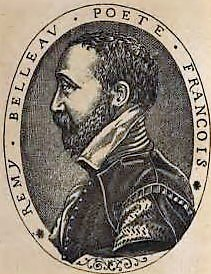
Rémy Belleau Oeuvres compltes 01

Remy (or Rémi) Belleau (French pronunciation: [ʁemi bɛlo]; 1528 – 6 March 1577) was a poet of the French Renaissance. He is most known for his paradoxical poems of praise for simple things and his poems about precious stones.

== Life ==
Remy was born in Nogent-le-Rotrou. A nobleman (under the tutelage of the Lorraine family), he did his studies under Marc Antoine Muret and George Buchanan. As a student, he became friends with the young poets Jean de La Péruse, Étienne Jodelle, Jean de La Taille and Pierre de Ronsard and the latter incorporated Remy into the "La Pléiade", a group of revolutionary young poets. Belleau's first published poems were odes, les Petites Inventions (1556), inspired by the ancient lyric Greek collection attributed to Anacreon and featuring poems of praise for such things as butterflies, oysters, cherries, coral, shadows, turtles. In the 1560s, Belleau tried his hand at a mixed verse and prose form modeled on the Italian pastoral Arcadia by Jacopo Sannazaro (French translation, 1544): this became La Bergerie (1565-1572), in which narration (in prose) is interspersed with poems on love and the countryside. His last work, les Amours et nouveaux Eschanges des Pierres precieuses (1576), is a poetic description of gems and their properties inspired by medieval and renaissance lapidary catalogues. He died in Paris on 6 March 1577, and was buried in Grands Augustins.

Remy Belleau was greatly admired by poets in the twentieth century, such as Francis Ponge.

== Bibliography ==
- The Oeuvres Completes (1867)
- Oeuvres Poetiques (1879)

== Sources ==
- (in French) Schmidt, Albert-Marie, ed. Poètes du XVIe siècle. Collection: Bibliothèque de la Pléiade. Paris: Gallimard, 1953. ISBN 2-07-010455-9
- (in French) Simonin, Michel, ed. Dictionnaire des lettres françaises - Le XVIe siècle. Paris: Fayard, 2001. ISBN 2-253-05663-4
