= Jean de Schelandre =

French poet (died 1635)

Jean de Schelandre (c.1585 – 18 October 1635), Seigneur de Saumazènes, was a French poet.

== Biography ==
He was born about 1585 near Verdun (then within the Holy Roman Empire) of a Calvinist family, and studied at the University of Paris. He then joined Turenne's army in the Netherlands, where he gained rapid advancement.

He was the author of a tragedy, Tyr et Sidon, ou les funestes amours de Belcar et Méliane, published in 1608 under the anagram-name Daniel d'Anchéres, and reprinted with numerous changes in 1628 under the author's own name. It has been suggested that Schelandre was directly acquainted with Shakespearian drama, but of this there is no direct proof, although he appears to have spent some time in England and to have seen James I.

He pursued his military career to the end of his life, dying at Saumazènes in 1635 from wounds received in the German campaign of Louis d'Epernon, Cardinal de la Valette.

== Tyr et Sidon ==
In defiance of all rules, the action of Tyr et Sidon proceeds alternately at Tyre where Belcar, prince of Sidon, is a prisoner, and at Sidon where Léonte, prince of Tyre, is a prisoner and pursues his gallant adventures. The play, which was divided into two days and ten acts, had a complicated plot and contained 5000 lines. It required an immense stage on which the two towns should be represented, with a field between, where the contests should take place.

Tyr et Sidon is noteworthy as an attempt to introduce the liberty of the Spanish and English drama into France, thus anticipating the romantic revolt of the 19th century. It is reprinted in the 8th volume of the Ancien Théâtre français. Schelandre was also the author of a Stuartide (1611), and of Les Sept Excellents Travaux de la penitence de Saint Pierre (1636).
