= Fool's literature =

Fool's literature was a literary tradition in medieval Europe in which the stock character of a fool was used as an allegory to satirize the contemporary society.

== Notable examples ==
- Der Ring (1410, The Ring), a satirical poem by Heinrich Wittenwiler
- Daß Narrenschyff ad Narragoniam (1494; Ship of Fools), a poem by the German satirist Sebastian Brant
- Moriae Encomium, sive Stultitiae Laus (1509, The Praise of Folly), by Erasmus of Rotterdam
- Narrenbeschwörung (1512; Exorcism of Fools), Die Schelmenzunft (1512); Die Gäuchmatt (1519, Fools' Meadow), Die Mühle von Schwindelsheim und Gretmüllerin Jahrzeit by Thomas Murner

== See also ==
- Picaresque novel
- Sotie
