= French alexandrine =

French poetic line of 12 syllables

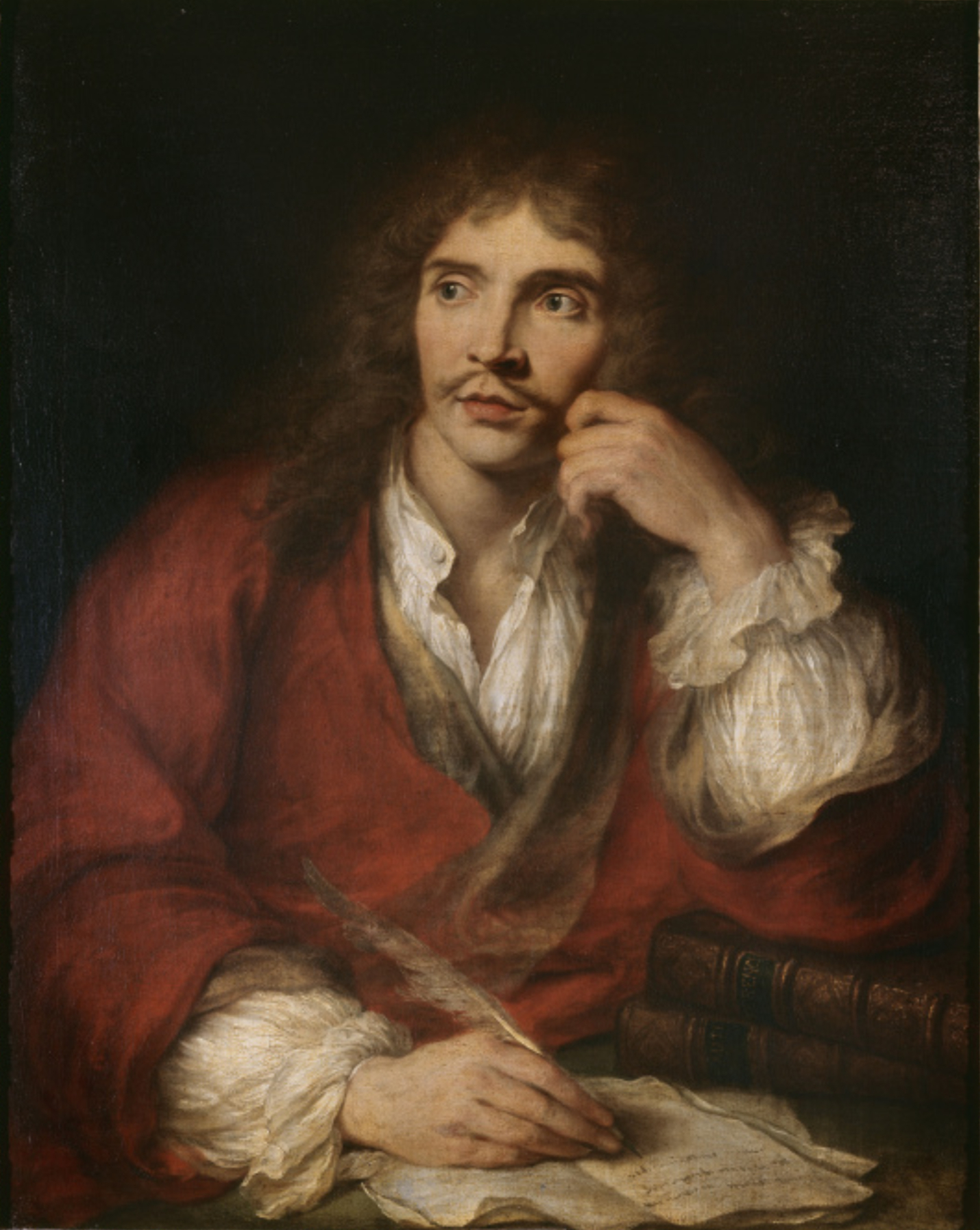
Molière

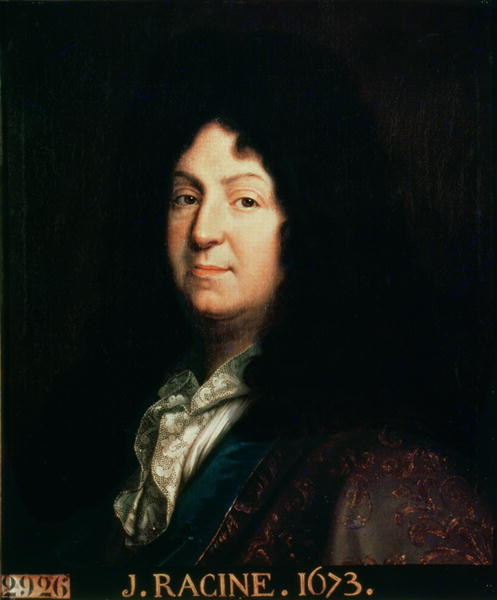
Jean Racine

Molière and Racine, perhaps the greatest writers of classical alexandrines in comedy and tragedy respectively.

The French alexandrine (French: alexandrin) is a syllabic poetic metre of (nominally and typically) 12 syllables with a medial caesura dividing the line into two hemistichs (half-lines) of six syllables each. It was the dominant long line of French poetry from the 17th through the 19th century, and influenced many other European literatures which developed alexandrines of their own.

== 12th to 15th centuries ==
=== Genesis ===
According to verse historian Mikhail Gasparov, the French alexandrine developed from the Ambrosian octosyllable,

 × –  u  – ×   –  u ×
Aeterne rerum conditor

by gradually losing the final two syllables,

 × –  u  – ×   –
Aeterne rerum cond (construct)

then doubling this line in a syllabic context with phrasal stress rather than length as a marker.

=== Rise and decline ===
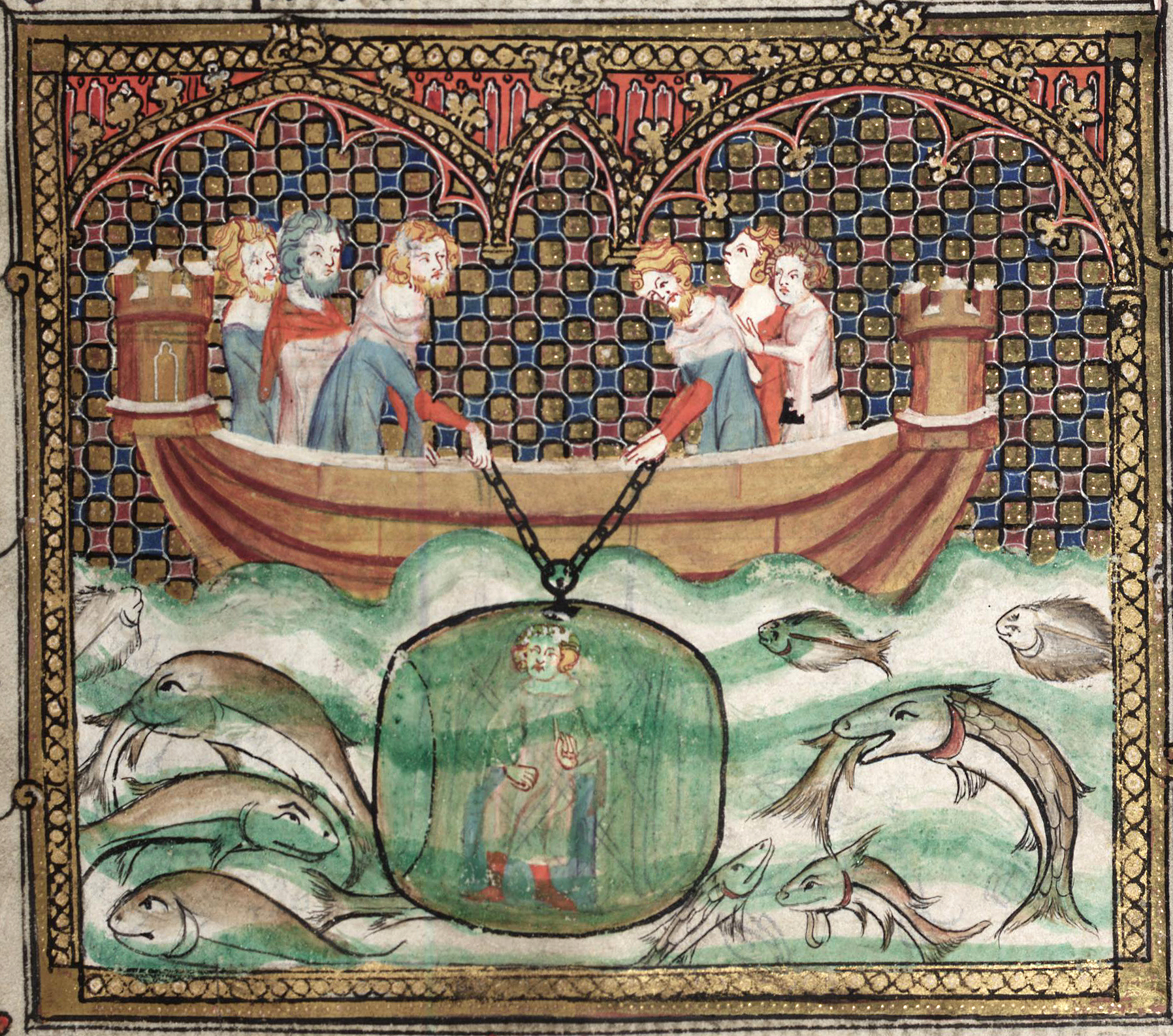
Alexander the Great in a diving bell: a scene from the line's namesake, the Roman d'Alexandre.

The earliest recorded use of alexandrines is in the Medieval French poem Le Pèlerinage de Charlemagne of 1150, but the name derives from their more famous use in part of the Roman d'Alexandre of 1170. L. E. Kastner states:

From about the year 1200 the Alexandrine began to supplant the decasyllabic line as the metre of the chansons de geste, and at the end of the thirteenth century it had gained so completely the upper hand as the epic line that several of the old chansons in the decasyllabic line were turned into Alexandrines...

These early alexandrines were slightly looser rhythmically than those reintroduced in the 16th century. Significantly, they allowed an "epic caesura" — an extrametrical mute e at the close of the first hemistich (half-line), as exemplified in this line from the medieval Li quatre fils Aymon:

o   o    o   o  o   S(e)   o  o   o o     o S
Or sunt li quatre frère | sus el palais plenier[4]

o=any syllable; S=stressed syllable; (e)=optional mute e; |=caesura

However, toward the end of the 14th century, the line was "totally abandoned, being ousted by its old rival the decasyllabic"; and despite occasional isolated attempts, would not regain its stature for almost 200 years.

== 16th to 18th centuries ==
The alexandrine was resurrected in the middle of the 16th century by the poets of the Pléiade, notably Étienne Jodelle (tragedy), Guillaume de Salluste Du Bartas (narrative), Jean-Antoine de Baïf (lyric), and Pierre de Ronsard. Later, Pierre Corneille introduced its use in comedy. It was metrically stricter, allowing no epic caesura:

o o o o o S | o o o o o S (e)

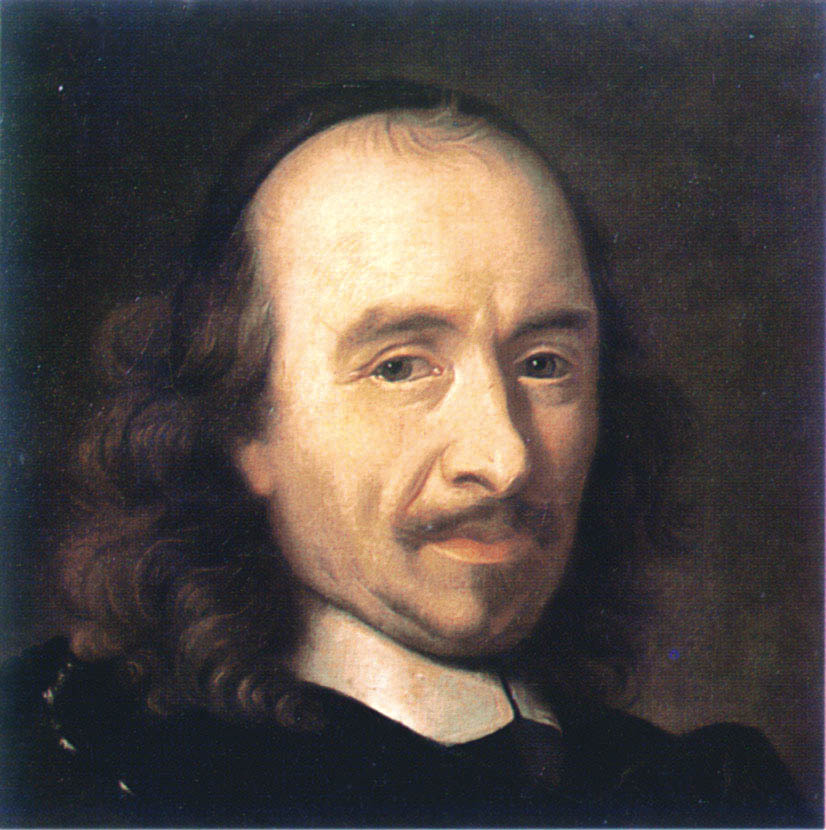
Pierre Corneille

Typically, each hemistich also holds one secondary accent which may occur on any of the first five syllables, most frequently on the third; this frequently balanced four-part structure resulted in one of several monikers for the line: alexandrin tétramètre (in contradistinction to the trimètre or alexandrin ternaire described below).

Often called the "classical alexandrine", vers héroïque, or grands vers, it became the dominant long line of French verse up to the end of the 19th century, and was "elevated to the status of national symbol and eventually came to typify French poetry overall". The classical alexandrine is always rhymed. The règle d'alternance des rimes (rule of alternation of rhymes), which was a tendency in some poets before the Pléiade, was "firmly established by Ronsard in the sixteenth century and rigorously decreed by Malherbe in the seventeenth." It states that "a masculine rime cannot be immediately followed by a different masculine rime, or a feminine rime by a different feminine rime." This rule resulted in the preponderance of three rhyme schemes, though others are possible. (Masculine rhymes are given in lowercase, and feminine in CAPS):

- rimes plates or rimes suivies: aaBB
- rimes croisées: aBaB (or AbAb)
- rimes embrassées aBBa (or AbbA)

These lines by Corneille (with formal paraphrase) exemplify classical alexandrines with rimes suivies:

Nous partîmes cinq cents; | mais par un prompt renfort
Nous nous vîmes trois mille | en arrivant au port,
Tant, à nous voir marcher | avec un tel visage,
Les plus épouvantés | reprenaient de courage!

— Corneille: Le Cid Act IV, scene 3, lines 1259-62
Translation:

As five hundred we left, | but soon we gained support:
To three thousand we grew | as we approached the port.
Thus, seeing us all march | in league and with such favor,
The fear melted away, | the throng becoming braver!

Some members of La Pléiade
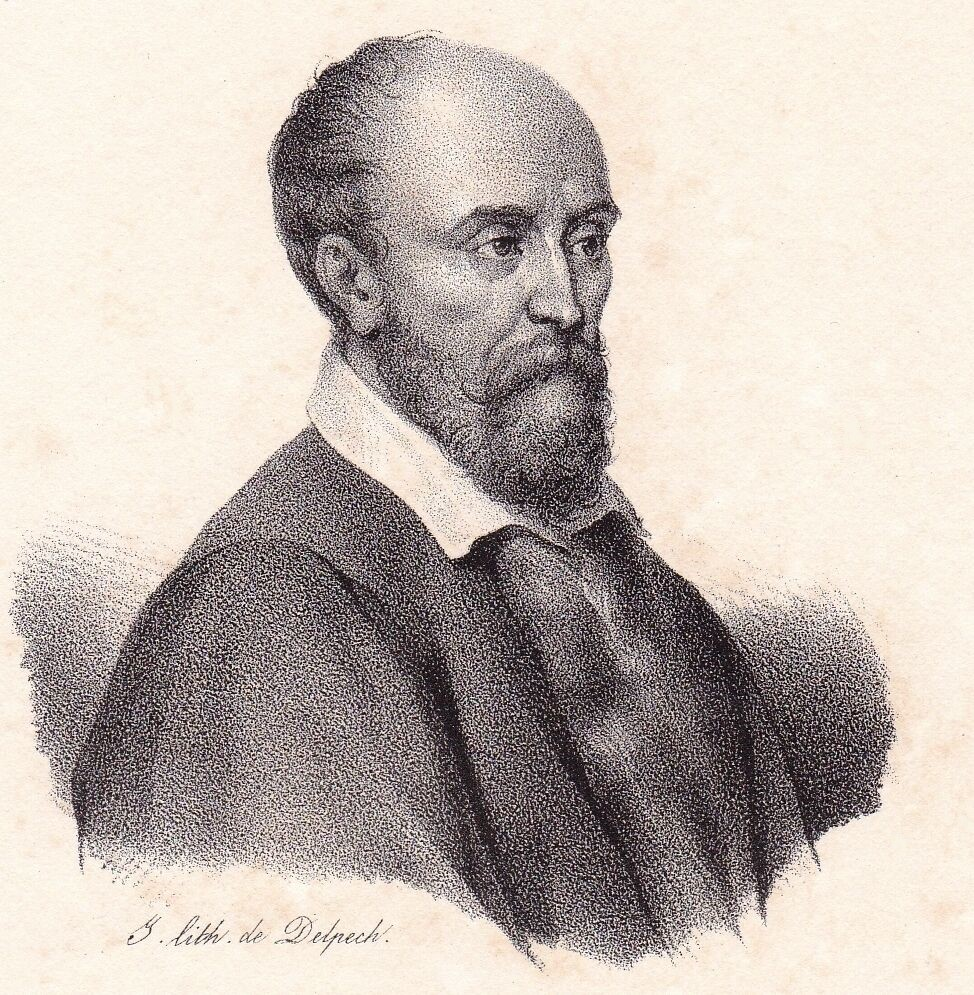
Pierre de Ronsard

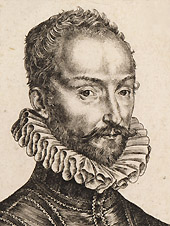
Étienne Jodelle

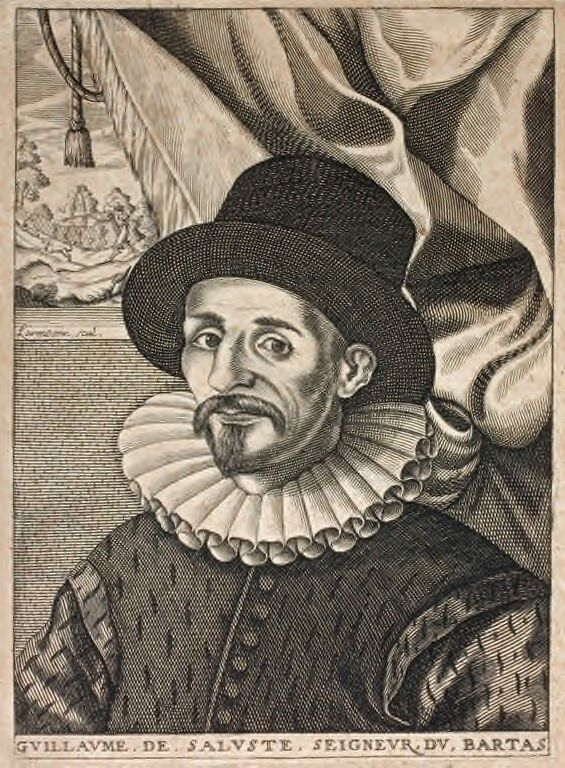
Guillaume de Salluste Du Bartas

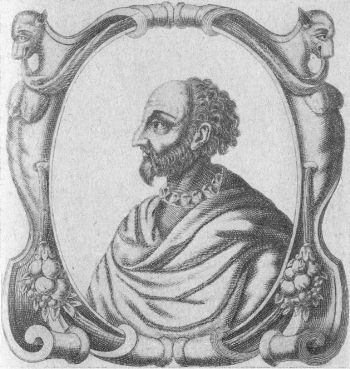
Jean-Antoine de Baïf

== Loosening strategies ==
The classical alexandrine was early recognized as having a prose-like effect, for example by Ronsard and Joachim du Bellay. This in part explains the strictness with which its prosodic rules (e.g. medial caesura and end rhyme) were kept; they were felt necessary to preserve its distinction and unity as verse. Nevertheless, several strategies for reducing the strictness of the verse form have been employed over the centuries.

=== Alexandrin ternaire ===
Although used in exceptional cases by some 17th-century French poets, Victor Hugo popularized the alexandrin ternaire (also referred to as trimètre) as an alternative rhythm to the classical alexandrine. His famous self-descriptive line:

J'ai disloqué | ce grand ¦ niais | d'alexandrin

— Hugo: "XXVI: Quelques mots à un autre", line 84
Translation:

I dislocate | the great ¦ nitwit | alexandrin

exemplifies the structure of the alexandrin ternaire, which preserves the medial caesura with a word break, but de-emphasizes it by surrounding it with two stronger phrase breaks after syllables four and eight:

o o o S | o o ¦ o S | o o o S (e)

|=strong caesura; ¦=word break

Although generally embraced by the French Romantics and Symbolists, the alexandrin ternaire remained a supplemental line, used within a classical alexandrine context and forming no more than one quarter of the alexandrine lines written during this time. Passages of classical alexandrines were still written by these poets, as for example this rimes croisées quatrain by Charles Baudelaire:

La très-chère était nue, | et, connaissant mon cœur,
Elle n'avait gardé | que ses bijoux sonores,
Dont le riche attirail | lui donnait l'air vainqueur
Qu'ont dans leurs jours heureux | les esclaves des Maures.

— Baudelaire: "Les Bijoux", lines 1-4
Translation:

My most darling was bare | but she knew my desire
So her bright jewels she wore, | her tinkling chains, her treasure:
Such an air of command | in her golden attire,
Like to a Moor's slave girl | in the days of her pleasure.

=== Vers libres, libéré, libre ===
These three similar terms (in French vers libres and vers libre are homophones) designate distinct historical strategies to introduce more prosodic variety into French verse. All three involve verse forms beyond just the alexandrine, but just as the alexandrine was chief among lines, it is the chief target of these modifications.

Vers libres

Vers libres (also vers libres classiques, vers mêlés, or vers irréguliers) are found in a variety of minor and hybrid genres of the 17th and 18th century. The works are composed of lines of various lengths, without regularity in distribution or order; however, each individual line is perfectly metrical, and the rule of alternation of rhymes is followed. The result is somewhat analogous to the Pindarics of Abraham Cowley. Two of the most famous works written in vers libres are Jean de La Fontaine's Fables and Molière's Amphitryon.

Vers libéré

Vers libéré was a mid-to-late-19th-century extension of the liberties begun to be taken by the Romantics with their embrace of the alexandrin ternaire. The liberties taken included the weakening, movement, and erasure of caesurae, and rejection of the rule of alternation of rhymes. Although writers of vers libéré consistently continued to use rhyme, many of them accepted categories of rhyme which were previously considered "careless" or unusual. The alexandrine was not their only metrical target; they also cultivated the use of vers impair — lines with an odd, rather than even, number of syllables. These uneven lines, though known from earlier French verse, were relatively uncommon and helped suggest a new rhythmic register.

Vers libre

Vers libre is the source of the English term free verse, and is effectively identical in meaning. It can be seen as a radical extension of the tendencies of both vers libres (various and unpredictable line lengths) and vers libéré (weakening of strictures for caesura and rhymes, as well as experimentation with unusual line lengths). Its birth — for the reading public at least — can be dated exactly: 1886; in this year, editor Gustave Kahn published several seminal vers libre poems in his review La Vogue, including poems by Arthur Rimbaud (written over a decade previously) and Jules Laforgue, with more following in the next years. Vers libre shed all metrical and prosodic constraints, such as verse length, rhyme, and caesura; Laforgue said, "I forget to rhyme, I forget about the number of syllables, I forget about stanzaic structure."

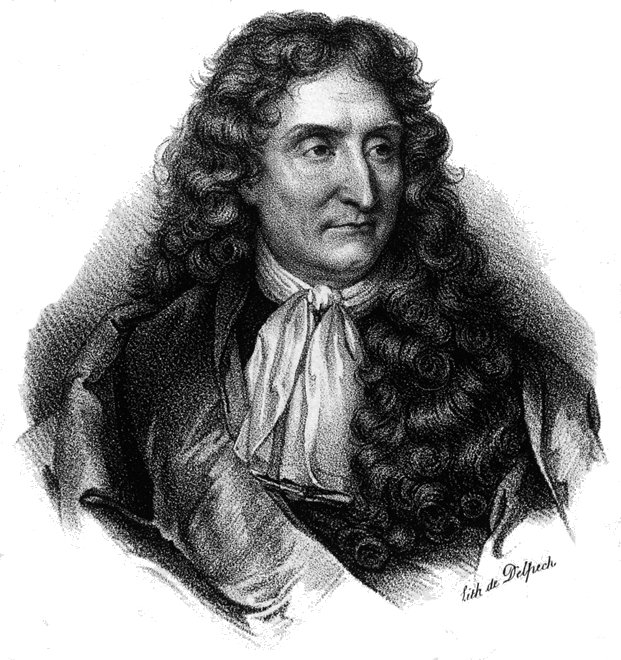
Jean de La Fontaine (1621–1695) composed vers libres.

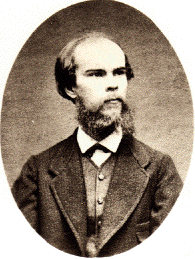
Paul Verlaine (1844–1896) composed vers libéré.

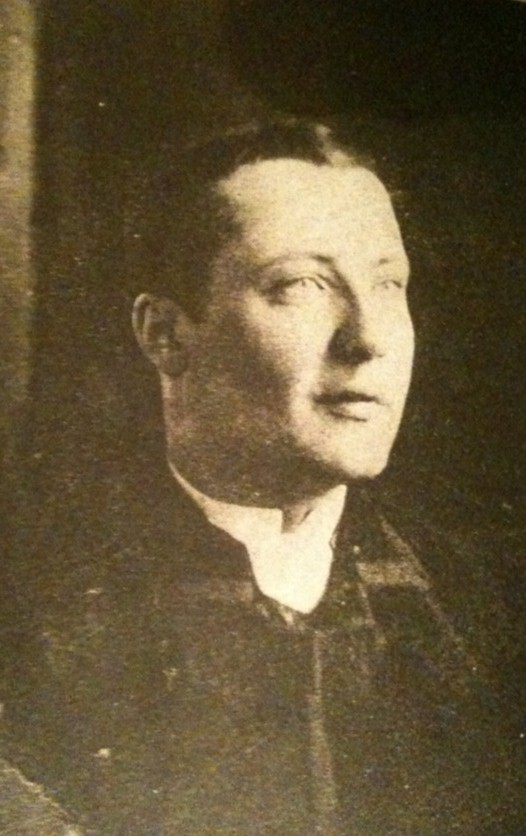
Jules Laforgue (1860–1887) composed vers libre.
