= Emmanuel de La Taille =

French journalist and television producer (1932–2021)

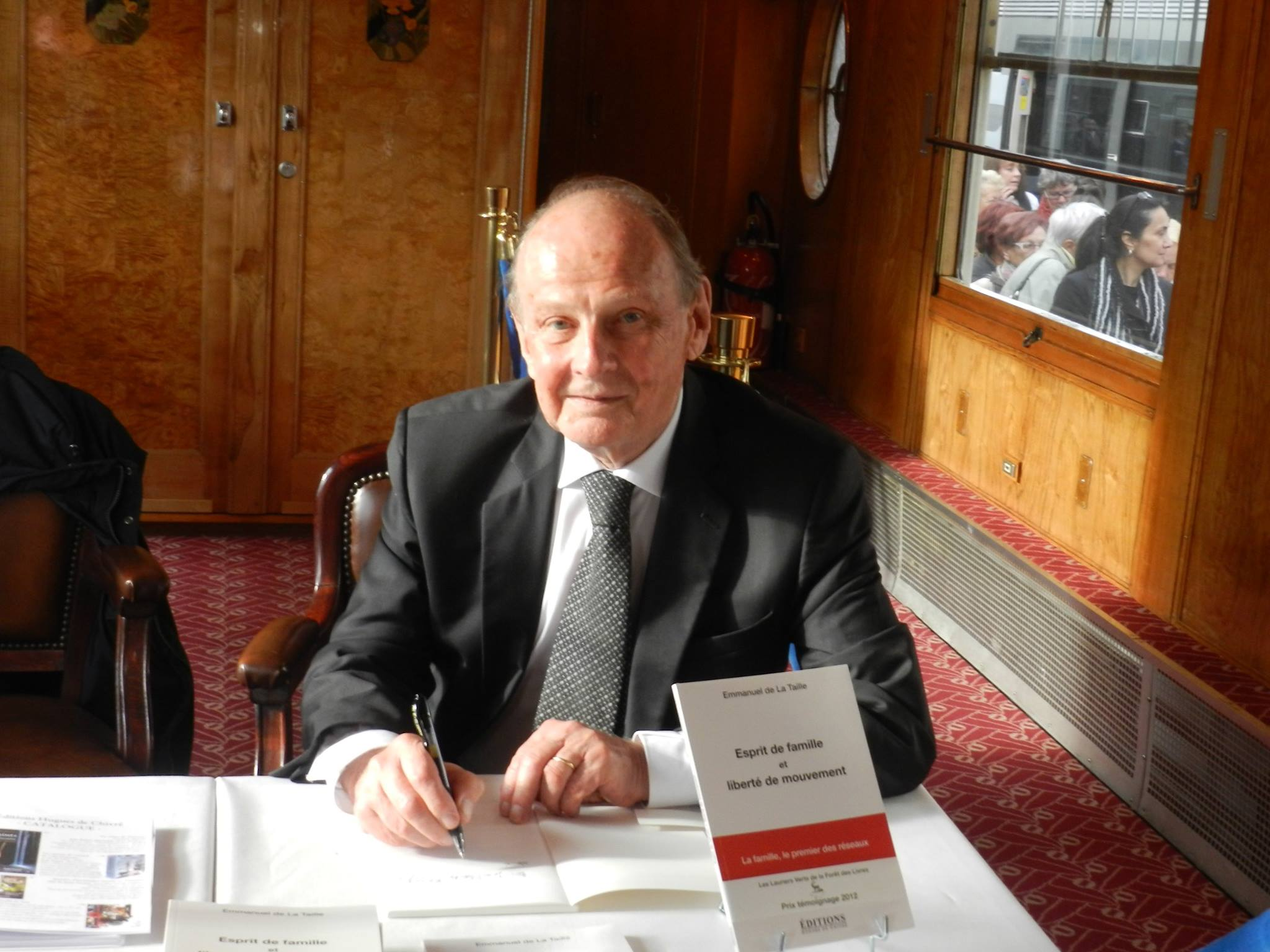
- de La Taille in 2014
- Born: 16 July 1932; Casablanca, French Morocco
- Died: 13 October 2021 (aged 89); 8th arrondissement of Paris, France
- Occupations: Journalist; Television producer

Emmanuel de La Taille (16 July 1932 – 13 October 2021) was a French journalist and television producer. He worked for TF1, where he was an economic correspondent.

== Biography ==
De La Taille was a descendant of the poet and playwright Jean de La Taille. He was a media pioneer, able to explain complex economic issues to the layman. He began his career in 1960, during the Algerian War. He became a correspondent of European affairs for Agence France-Presse in 1962 and was stationed in Brussels. He was spoken highly of by President Charles de Gaulle. He became head of the foreign service at the Office de Radiodiffusion Télévision Française in 1965, a time when only two French television channels existed. He then worked at TF1, serving as a special envoy to America and head of the economic service.

From 1978 to 1988, de La Taille worked with François de Closets and Alain Weiller on the program L'Enjeu, and on Le Club de l'Enjeu on TF1 from 1987 to 1994. He then worked on L'Enjeu international on TV5Monde from 1994 to 1998. In 2009, he received the Prix littéraire Les Lauriers verts for his journalistic work.

In 1986, de La Taille founded the Press Club de France and became honorary president. He also worked with an association in Électricité de France to assist disabled children. In 2000, he founded the Institut de l'innovation sociale.

Emmanuel de La Taille died in a traffic collision in the 8th arrondissement of Paris on 13 October 2021, at the age of 89.

== Works ==
- Esprit de famille et liberté de mouvement : La famille, le premier des réseaux (2012)
- La vie éternelle ? : Petit guide de l'opération résurrection (2017)
- 1940 - 2020 De guerres en crises : Un parcours français (2020)
