= Jacques Grévin =

French playwright (c. 1539–1570)

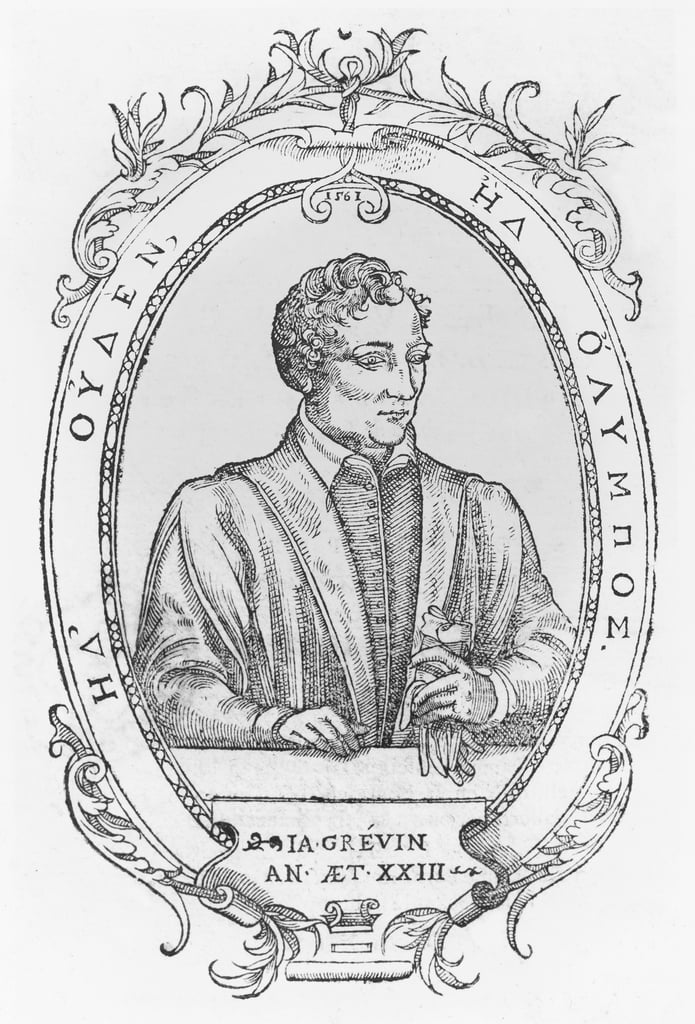
Jacques Grévin

Jacques Grévin (French pronunciation: [ʒak ɡʁevɛ̃]; c. 1539 – 5 November 1570) was a French playwright.

Grévin was born at Clermont, Oise in about 1539, and he studied medicine at the University of Paris. He became a disciple of Ronsard, and was one of the band of dramatists who sought to introduce the classical drama in France. As Sainte-Beuve points out, the comedies of Grévin show considerable affinity with the farces and soties that preceded them. His first play, La Maubertine was lost, and formed the basis of a new comedy, La Trésorière, first performed at the college of Beauvais in 1558, though it had been originally composed at the desire of Henry II to celebrate the marriage of Claude, duchess of Lorraine.

He got engaged to the writer Nicole Estienne and he celebrated her in his collection L'Olimpe. The engagement was broken for unknown reasons.

In 1560 followed the tragedy of Jules César, imitated from the Latin of Muret, and a comedy, Les Ébahis, the most important but also the most indecent of his works. Grévin was also the author of some medical works and of miscellaneous poems, which were praised by Ronsard until the friends were separated by religious differences. Grévin became in 1561 physician and counsellor to Margaret of Savoy, and died at her court in Turin in 1570.

Le Théâtre de Jacques Grévin was printed in 1562, and in the Ancien Théâtre français, vol. iv. (1855–1856). See L Pinvert, Jacques Grévin (1899).

== Works ==
- Hymne à Monseigneur le Dauphin sur le mariage dudict seigneur et de Mme Marie d'Estevart, royne d'Escosse, 1558
- Les Regretz de Charles d'Austriche, empereur, cinquiesme de ce nom. Ensemble la description du Beauvoisis et autres œuvres, 1558
- Chant de joie de la paix faicte entre le roi de France Henri II et Philippe, roi d'Espagne, 1559
- L'Olimpe de Jacques Grévin. Ensemble les autres œuvres poëtiques dudit auteur, 1560
- Le Théâtre de Jacques Grévin. Ensemble, la seconde partie de l'Olimpe et de la Gélodacrye, 1561; 1562
- Palinodies de Pierre de Ronsard, sur ses Discours des misères de ce temps, with Antoine de la Roche Chandieu, 1563
- Seconde Response de F. de La Baronie à Messire Pierre de Ronsard prestre gentilhomme Vandomois, evesque futur; plus Le temple de Ronsard où la légende de sa vie est briefvement descrite, 1563
- Anatomes totius, aere insculpta Delineatio, cui addita est Epitome innumeris mendis repurgata, quam de corporis humani fabrica conscripsit clariiss. And. Vesalius, eique accessit partium corporis tum simplicium tum compositarum brevis elucidatio, 1564
- Discours de Jaques Grévin sur les vertus et facultez de l'antimoine, contre ce qu'en a escrit maistre Loys de Launay, 1566
- Cinq livres de l'imposture et tromperie des diables, des enchantements et sorcelleries, pris du latin de Johann Weyer et faits français par Jaques Grévin, 1567; 1569
- La Première et la seconde partie des dialogues françois pour les jeunes enfans. "Het Eerste ende tweede deel van de françoische t'samensprekinghen, overgheset in de nederduytsche spraecke", with Christophe Plantin, 1567
- Deux livres des venins, ausquels il est amplement discouru des bestes venimeuses, thériaques, poisons et contre-poisons. Ensemble les œuvres de Nicander, traduites en vers français, 1567-1568
- Les Portraicts anatomiques de toutes les parties du corps humain, gravez en taille douce. Ensemble l'Abrégé d'Andreas Vesalius et l'explication d'iceux, accompagnée d'une déclaration anatomique, par Jacques Grevin, 1569
- Les Emblesmes du S. Adrian Le Jeune, faits français et sommairement expliqués par Jacques Grévin, 1570
- De Venenis libri duo, gallice primum ab eo scripti et nunc tandem opera Hieremiae Martii, in latinum sermonem conversi. Quibus adjunctus est praeterea ejusdem auctoris de antimonio tractatus, eodem interprete, 1571
- Cesar, tragedy, 1578
- Les Preceptes de Plutarque, monstrant la maniere comme il faut se gouverner en mariage, translatez selon la verité du grec par Jacques Grevin, de Clermont avec une Chanson de la femme vertueuse & bonne ménagère, s. d.
- Le Second Discours de Jaques Grévin sur les vertus et facultez de l'antimoine, pour la confirmation de l'advis des médecins de Paris et pour servir d'apologie contre ce qu'a escrit M. Loïs de Launay, s. d.
- In 1578, part of his odes is set in musique by Antoine de Bertrand.

=== Modern editions ===
- Sonnets d'Angleterre et de Flandre, publiés par Léon Dorez, Paris : H. Leclerc et P. Cornuau, 1898
- Théâtre complet et poésies choisies de Jacques Grévin, with notice et notes by Lucien Pinvert, Paris : Librairie Garnier frères, 1922
- De l'Imposture des diables, by Jean Wier, translation by Jacques Grévin de De praestigiis daemenum et incantationibus ac venificiis, Paris : Théraplix, 1970
- César, édition critique with introduction and notes by Ellen S. Ginsberg, Genève : Droz; Paris : Minard, 1971
- César, édition critique with introduction and notes by Jeffrey Foster, Paris : A.G. Nizet, 1974
- La Trésorière. Les Esbahis, comédies, édition critique with introduction and notes by Élisabeth Lapeyre, Paris : H. Champion, 1980
- La Gélodacrye et Les vingt-quatre sonnets romains, texte établi et annoté par Michèle Clément, Saint-Étienne : Publications de l'Université de Saint-Étienne, 2001

== Bibliography ==
- Lucien Pinvert, Jacques Grévin (1538-1570) - Sa vie, ses écrits, ses amis, étude biographique et littéraire, thèse de la Faculté des Lettres de Nancy, Paris : Fontemoing, 1898
- Lucien Pinvert, Notice sur Grévin, dans Théâtre complet et Poésies choisies de Jacques Grévin, Paris : Garnier Frères, 1922
- L. Dorez, La mort de J. Grévin, Bulletin du bibliophile, 1899, p. 325-328
- R. Aldington, J. Grévin, French Studies, 1926, p. 92-101
- M. Maloigne, J. Grévin, sa vie, son œuvre, Laval : Parnéoud, 1926
- B. Weinberg, The sources of Grevin's ideal on comedy and tragedy, Modern Philology, 1947, p. 46 et suiv.
- Docteur J. Colombe, Portraits d'ancêtres - II - Jacques Grévin, Hippocrate revue d'humanisme médical, mars-avril 1949, n° 2-3, pp. 3–46
- Henri Weber, La création poétique en France au XVI^{e} siècle, Paris, 1956, tome II, p. 559 et suiv.
