= Azannes-et-Soumazannes =

- Commune
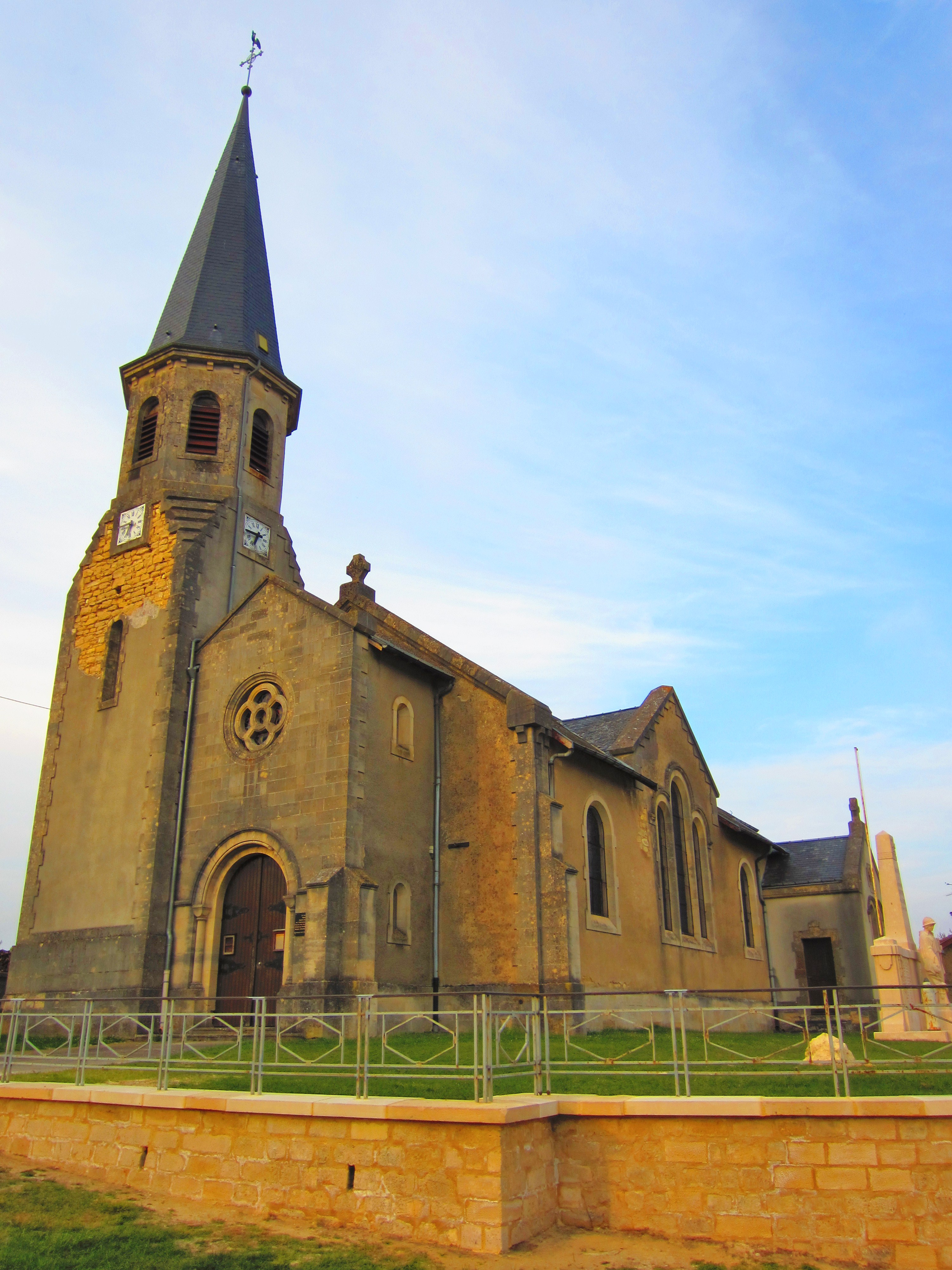
- The church in Azannes-et-Soumazannes

- Coat of arms
- Location of Azannes-et-Soumazannes
- Location within France Location within Grand Est
- Coordinates: 49°17′32″N 5°28′05″E
- Country: France
- Region: Grand Est
- Department: Meuse
- Arrondissement: Verdun
- Canton: Montmédy
- Intercommunality: CC Damvillers Spincourt

Government
  - Mayor (2020–2026): Hubert Sellier
- Area^{1}: 18.11 km^{2} (6.99 sq mi)
- Elevation: 224 m (735 ft)
- Highest elevation: 354 m (1,161 ft)
- Lowest elevation: 208 m (682 ft)
- Population (2023): 168
  - Density: 9.28/km^{2} (24.0/sq mi)
- Time zone: UTC+01:00 (CET)
  - Summer (DST): UTC+02:00 (CEST)
- INSEE/Postal code: 55024 /55150
- ^{1} French Land Register data, which excludes lakes, ponds, glaciers > 1 km^{2} (0.386 sq mi or 247 acres) and river estuaries.

Azannes-et-Soumazannes (French pronunciation: [azan e sumazan]) is a commune in the Meuse department in the Grand Est region in northeastern France.

== See also ==
- Communes of the Meuse department
