= Charles Joseph Marty-Laveaux =

French literary scholar

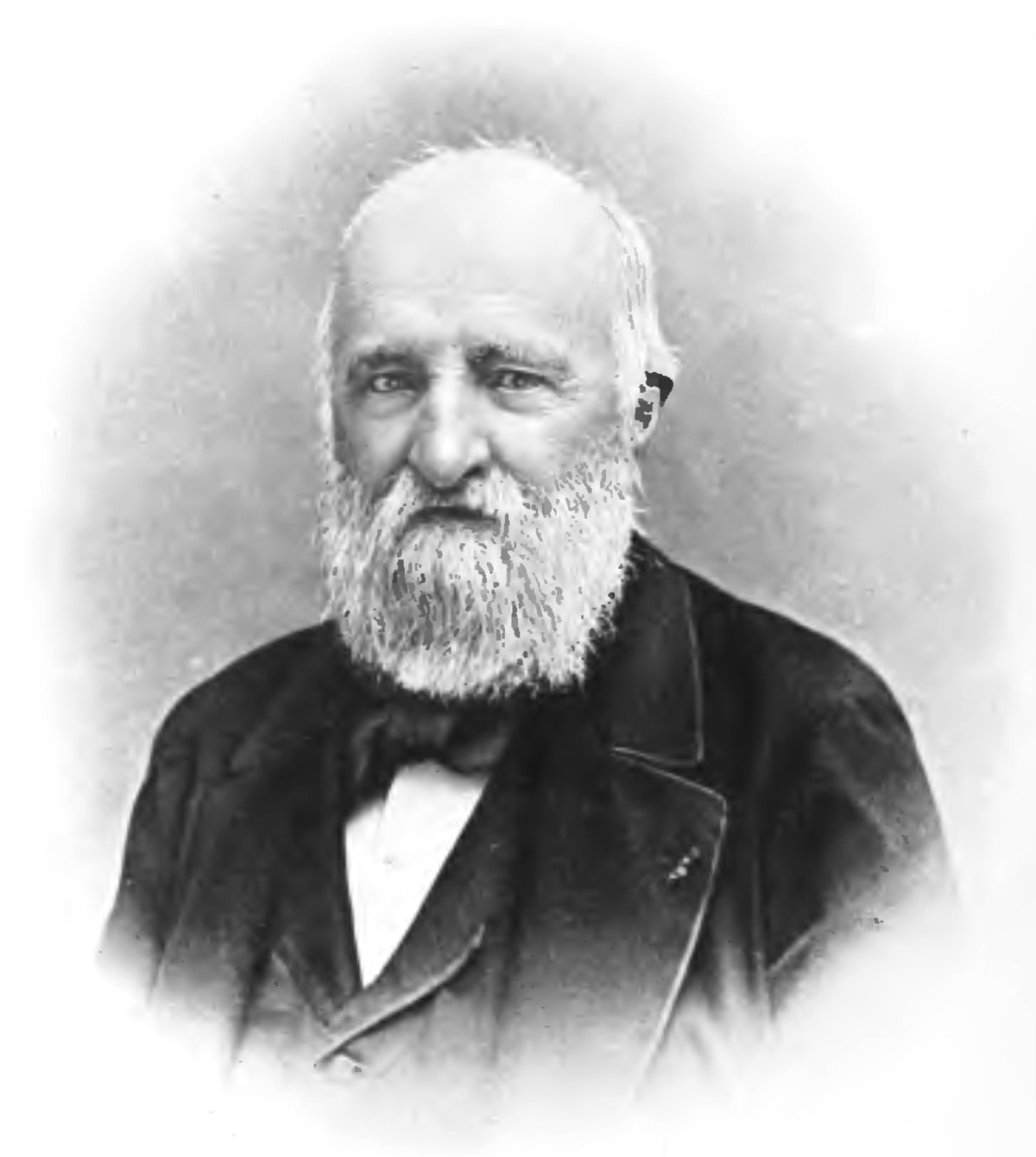
Portrait of Charles Joseph Marty-Laveaux published in Études de langue française by Alphonse Lemerre (1901)

Charles Joseph Marty-Laveaux (13 April 1823, in Paris – 11 July 1899, in Vitry-sur-Seine) was a French literary scholar. He is best known for his La Pléiade Française, a long series of editions of the poets of La Pléiade. He also edited Corneille's works (1862–68).
