= Pontus de Tyard =

French poet and priest

Pontus de Tyard (also Thyard, Thiard) (c. 1521 – 23 September 1605) was a French poet and priest, a member of "La Pléiade".

== Life ==
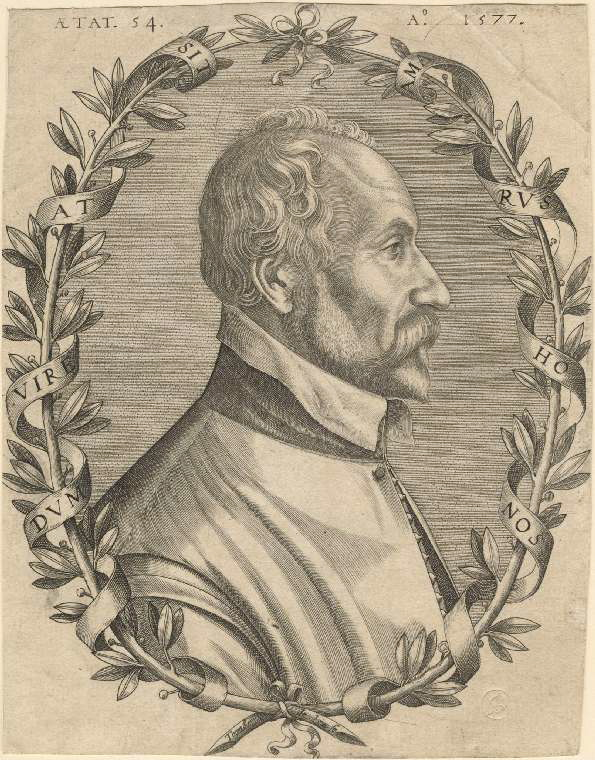

He was born at Bissy-sur-Fley in Burgundy, of which he was seigneur, but the exact year of his birth is uncertain. He became a friend of Antoine Héroet and Maurice Scève. His first published work, Erreurs amoureuses 1549, was augmented with other poems in successive editions till 1573. His work anticipated that of Pierre de Ronsard and Joachim du Bellay. He was one of the first to write sonnets in the French language (preceded by Clément Marot and Mellin de Saint-Gelais). He is also said to have introduced the sestina, originally a Provençal invention, into French poetry.

Tyard contributed to the poetic and metaphysical program of La Pléiade by elaborating, in his Solitaire Premier, ou Prose des Muses, et de la fureur poétique (1552), a full theory of divine fury, derived in large part from the Latin translations and commentaries by the neo-platonic author Marsilio Ficino of Plato's dialogues Ion and (especially) Phaedrus at the end of the 15th century. Tyard distinguished divine inspiration from madness or "alienation" brought on by other causes, and subdivided divine inspiration into four kinds: (1) poetic fury, gift of the Muses; (2) knowledge of religious mysteries, through Bacchus; (3) prophecy and divination through Apollo; (4) inspiration brought on by Venus/Eros.

In his later years he devoted himself to the study of mathematics and philosophy. He became bishop of Chalon-sur-Saône in 1578, and in 1587 published his Discours philosophiques. He was a zealous defender of King Henry III of France against the claims of the House of Guise. This attitude led to his persecution; he was driven from Chalon and his château at Bissy-sur-Fley was plundered. Nevertheless, he survived all the other members of the Pléiade and lived to see the onslaught made on their doctrines by François de Malherbe. Pontus resigned his bishopric in 1594, and retired to the Château de Bragny, where he died.
