= Étienne Jodelle =

French dramatist and poet

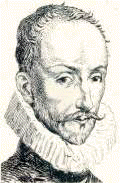
- Born: Étienne Jodelle, seigneur de Limodin c. 1532; Paris, Kingdom of France
- Died: c. 20 September 1573 (aged 41); Ibidem
- Occupations: Playwright; poet
- Writing career
- Language: Early Modern French
- Period: Before 1553 – 1573
- Literary movement: La Pléiade, French Renaissance

Étienne Jodelle, seigneur de Limodin (French pronunciation: [etjɛn ʒɔdɛl]; 1532 – July 1573), French dramatist and poet, was born and died in Paris of a noble family. Member of La Pléiade, he will strive to revitalize the principles of ancient Greek and Roman theater during the Renaissance. He was the first to introduce the alexandrine into tragedy in his time, notably with Cléopâtre captive, the first tragédie à l'antique, as well as L'Eugène in comedy. He is recognized as a precursor of the theater which was born in the second half of the 16th century, a convulsive period by Wars of Religion which saw its uncertainties embodied in his work.

== Biography ==
Jodelle belongs to the Parisian bourgeoisie, but he is attracted to the nobility. He is “Seigneur du Lymodin”. The premature death of her father when Jodelle was only four years old forced her mother, Marie Drouet, to take care of the education of her children, Étienne and his sister. Her maternal uncle, Étienne de Passavant, who owned a large collection of books, seems to have been the one who ignited Jodelle's taste for literature.

He stayed in Lyon to 1550, then he settled in Paris where he became friends with Jean Antoine de Baïf, Nicolas Denisot and Remy Belleau. He belongs to the circle of the patron Jean II Brinon. Attached himself to the poetic circle of the Pléiade and proceeded to apply the principles of the reformers to dramatic composition. Jodelle aimed at creating a classical drama that should be in every respect different from the moralities and soties that then occupied the French stage, his first play, Cléopâtre captive, was represented before the court at the hôtel de Reims in 1552. Jodelle himself took the title role, and the cast included his friends Remy Belleau and Jean Bastier de La Péruse, in honour of the play's success the friends organized a ceremony inspired by pagan rites called Pompe du Bouc at Arcueil when a goat garlanded with flowers was led in procession and presented to the author. The ceremony was exaggerated by the enemies of the Ronsardists into a renewal of the pagan rites of the worship of Bacchus.

Jodelle wrote two other plays. Eugène, a comedy satirizing the superior clergy, had less success than it deserved. Its preface poured scorn on Jodelle's predecessors in comedy, but in reality his own methods are not so very different from theirs. Didon se sacrifiant, a tragedy which follows Virgil's narrative, appears never to have been represented. Jodelle died in poverty in July 1573. His works were collected the year after his death by Charles de la Mothe. They include a quantity of miscellaneous verse dating chiefly from Jodelle's youth. The intrinsic value of his tragedies is small. Cléopâtre is lyric rather than dramatic. Throughout the five acts of the piece nothing actually happens. The death of Antony is announced by his ghost in the first act; the story of Cleopatra's suicide is related, but not represented, in the fifth. Each act is terminated by a chorus which moralizes on such subjects as the inconstancy of fortune and the judgments of heaven on human pride. But the play was the starting-point of French classical tragedy, and was soon followed by the Médée (1553) of Jean Bastier de La Péruse and the Aman (1561) of André de Rivaudeau. Jodelle was a rapid worker, but idle and fond of dissipation. His friend Ronsard said that his published poems gave no adequate idea of his powers.

While he was considered favorable to the Reformation, he wrote the sonnets Contre les ministres de la nouvelle opinion. He was later accused of having defended the St. Bartholomew's Day massacre, notably by Pierre de l'Estoile. He may have been part of the literary circle of Maréchale de Retz.

Jodelle received five hundred pounds from Charles IX of France in 1572, but continued to fall into debt, and he died in poverty in July 1573, in a hovel on rue Champ-Fleury2. The Protestant poet Agrippa d'Aubigné celebrated him in Funereal Verses. It was Charles de La Mothe who, after the poet's death, had his Œuvres et melanges poëtiques printed (Paris, N. Chesneau and M. Patisson, 1574).

In modern times, the contribution of his work has gained importance, as a precursor of theater in the country but also in the development of what would later be called French classical theater.

Jodelle's works are collected (1868) in the Pléiade française of Charles Marty-Laveaux. The prefatory notice gives full information of the sources of Jodelle's biography, and La Mothe's criticism is reprinted in its entirety.

== Plays and posterity ==
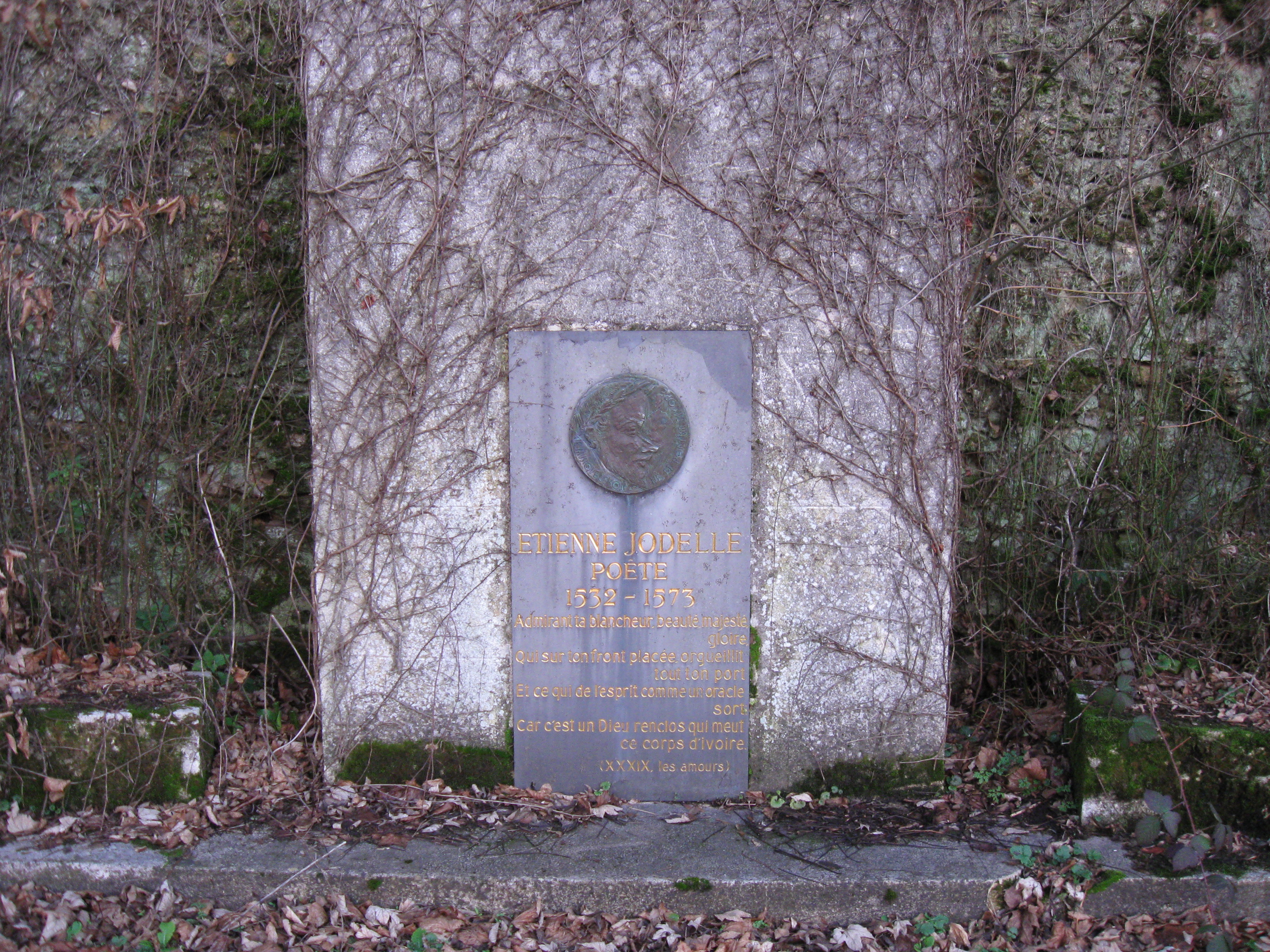
Stele dedicated to Étienne Jodelle, in the homonymous street, Seine-et-Marne, Île-de-France.

His works exerted a strong influence on the subsequent development of various genres of dramaturgy which continued long after him.

- L'Eugène (1553)
- Cléopâtre captive (1553)
- Didon se sacrifiant (1555) which takes up the material and a certain number of verses from The Aeneid by Virgil (IV).
- Poésies politiques (1572)
- Les Amours et autres poésies Online

Modern editions

- Didon se sacrifiantf, text edited and presented by Mariangela Miotti, Tragedy at the time of Henry II and Charles IX (1573–1575), 1st series, vol . 5, Florence-Paris, Olschki-P.U.F., 1993, p. 359-430.
- Complete works, edited by E. Balmas, Paris, Gallimard, 1968
- L'Amour obscure, Poems chosen and presented by Robert Melançon, Paris, Orphée/La Différence, 1991
- Didon se sacrifiant, edited by J.-C. Ternaux, Paris, Champion, 2002
- Cleopatre catpive, edited and presented by Emmanuel Buron, Tragic theater of the 16th century, Garnier Flammarion, 2020
- Like one who got lost in the deep forest: sonnets; edited by Agnes Rees; preface by Florence Delay, Gallimard, 2022, 225 p.

=== Tributes ===
- Pathelin, Cléopâtre, Arlequin. Le théâtre dans la France de la Renaissance at Château d'Écouen, exposition in collaboration with Bibliothèque nationale de France and Musée national de la Renaissance, 22 November 2018.
- The asteroid 317917-Jodelle was named in her honor.
