= Sotie =

French satirical literary form

A sotie (or sottie) is a short satirical play common during the 15th- and 16th-century in France. The word (compare modern sottise) comes from the sots, "fools", who appeared as characters in the play. In the plays, these fools would make observations and exchange thoughts on contemporary events and individuals. Shorter plays, sometimes referred to as parades, did not necessarily have any plot at all, but relied simply on a detached dialogue. The genre has its origin in the Feast of Fools and other Carnival-related festivities. The purpose of these events was to present a world turned upside-down, in this case with the fools as fount of wisdom. The fools were dressed in grey robes, and wore a hood with donkey ears.

There is some scholarly debate over whether the sotie should be considered a separate genre from the farce or the morality play, but it does have certain unique characteristics. Whereas the characters in a farce would be distinguishable individuals with proper names, the characters in the soties were pure allegories. The characters had names such as "First Fool" and "Second Fool", or "Everyman", "Pilgrim" etc. Sometime there would be a leader of the fools, called "Mother Fool" (Mère Sotte). These allegorical protagonists were also common to morality plays, but unlike this genre, the sotie was primarily meant to entertain. The plays also had highly complex rhyme schemes, and sophisticated verse structures.

The best known soties playwright is Pierre Gringore, and the best-known play his 1511 Jeu du prince des sots (Play of the Prince of Fools). In this play, "Mother Fool" represents the papacy, and for this reason the satire was tolerated by the French king. Another renowned soties playwright was the court jester Triboulet, whose merits were rewarded generously by René of Anjou and Charles, Duke of Orléans. In the 16th century, soties were banned and went out of use. The term has, however, been used also for modern works. The 20th-century author André Gide referred to his 1914 novel Les caves du Vatican as a sotie.

== See also ==
- Fool's literature
