= Jean de La Taille =

French poet (1540–1607)

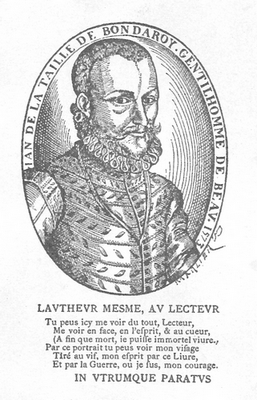

Jean de La Taille (French pronunciation: [ʒɑ̃ də la taj]; c.1540 – c.1607) was a French poet and dramatist born in Bondaroy.

== Life ==
He studied the humanities in Paris under Muretus, and law at Orléans under Anne de Bourg. He began his career as a Huguenot, but afterwards adopted a mild Catholicism. He was wounded at the Battle of Arnay-le Duc in 1570, and retired to his estate at Bondaroy, where he wrote a political pamphlet entitled Histoire abrégée des singeries de la ligue. His chief poem is a satire on the follies of court life, Le Courtisan retiré; he also wrote a political poem, Le Prince Nécessaire. But his fame rests on his achievements in drama. In 1572 appeared the tragedy of Saül le furieux, with a preface on L'Art de la tragédie. He wrote, not for the general public whom the mysteries and farces had addressed, but for the limited audience of a lettered aristocracy. He therefore expressed disproval of the native drama and insisted on the Senecan model. He objected to deaths on the stage on the ground that the representation is unconvincing.

== Sources ==
- Corinne Noirot-Maguire. "Conjurer le mal: Jean de La Taille et le paradoxe de la tragédie humaniste." EMF: Studies in Early Modern France 13, "Spectacle in Late Medieval and Early Modern France," eds. J. Persels and R. Ganim. Feb. 2010. 121-43.
