= Marcus Antonius Muretus =

French humanist (1526–1585)

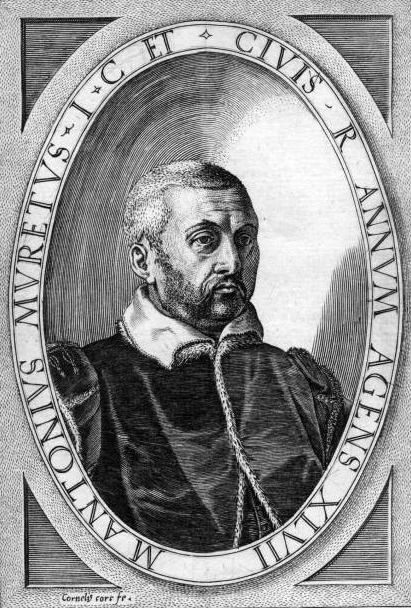
Muretus by Cornelis Cort

Marc Antoine Muret (French pronunciation: [maʁk ɑ̃twan myʁɛ]; 12 April 1526 – 4 June 1585), better known by his Latinized name Marcus Antonius Muretus, was a French humanist who was among the revivers of an Attic, or anti-Ciceronian, prose style, and is among the usual candidates for the best Latin prose stylist of the Renaissance.

== Biography ==
He was born at Muret near Toulouse. At the age of eighteen he attracted the notice of the elder Scaliger, and was invited to lecture in the archiepiscopal college at Auch. He afterwards taught Latin at Villeneuve, and then at the College of Guienne, Bordeaux, where his Latin tragedy Julius Caesar was presented. Some time before 1552 he delivered a course of lectures in the Collège du Cardinal Lemoine at Paris, which drew a large audience, King Henry II and his queen being among his hearers. In Paris he formed part of the larger circle of humanists and poets that included Jean Dorat and Pierre de Ronsard. He wrote almost exclusively in Latin: epigrams, odes, satires and letters, which were widely circulated before they were printed. His orations remained models for students through the eighteenth century.

His success made him many enemies, and he was thrown into prison on a charge of homosexuality, but released by the intervention of powerful friends. The same accusation was brought against him at Toulouse, and he only saved his life by timely flight. The records of the town show that he was burned in effigy as a Huguenot and as sodomite (1554).

After a wandering and insecure life of some years in Italy, he received and accepted the invitation of the Cardinal Ippolito II d'Este to settle in Rome in 1559. In 1561 Muretus revisited France as a member of the cardinal's suite at the conference between Roman Catholics and Protestants held at Poissy.

He returned to Rome in 1563. His lectures gained him a European reputation, and in 1578 he received a tempting offer from the king of Poland to become teacher of jurisprudence in his new college at Kraków. Muretus, however, who about 1576 had taken holy orders, was induced by the liberality of Gregory XIII to remain in Rome, where he died.

Muretus edited a number of classical authors with learned and scholarly notes. His other works include Juvenilia et poemata varia, orationes and epistolae.

== Works ==
- Two volumes of Scripta selecta, edited by J. Frey, 1871.
- Variae lectiones, edited by Friedrich August Wolf and J. H. Fasi, 1791–1828.
- The Iuvenilia of Marc-Antoine Muret, edited and translated by Kirk. M. Summers, Columbus, OH: 2006

=== Complete editions ===
- Editio princeps, Verona (1727–1730). There were further editions of Muretus edited by David Ruhnken (1789) and by C. H. Frotscher (1834–1841).

=== On-line ===
- Julius Caesar Muretus' Senecan tragedy, printed in 1591 (Latin text)
