= Capuan school of rhetoric =

The Capuan school of rhetoric (Italian: scuola capuana) was a tradition of education in Latin rhetoric that supposedly existed in Capua in the late 12th and early 13th century. The city of Capua itself was not the only centre of such education in the Terra di Lavoro. There were probably many small schools teaching the ars dictaminis (art of letter-writing) in the shadow of the Abbey of Montecassino. Many of the dictatores responsible for drafting correspondence at the papal chancery or the court of Frederick II, Holy Roman Emperor, came from this region.

There is no direct documentation of a school teaching rhetoric in Capua. The "Capuan school" is thus a historiographic construct based more than anything on three individual rhetors and their association with the city: Giovanni, nephew of Pier della Vigna; Rainaldo Gentile, archbishop of Capua; and Cardinal Thomas of Capua. The most famous product of the school was Pier della Vigna himself. The foundation of the University of Naples in the 1224 has been associated with these schools. Both Frederick II and his son Conrad IV sought to merge all schools of higher learning in the Kingdom of Sicily into the new university. Conrad, in a letter addressed to the justiciar of the Terra di Lavoro in 1252 or 1253, is explicit that grammar schools were exempted, implying the continued existence of such schools in that region.

The Latin prose style associated with Capua was "baroque [and] allusive" or "artificial and overladen". The dictaminal style of Pier della Vigna retained its dominance in letter-writing until the rise of Ciceronianism at the Renaissance. There are over 150 manuscripts containing collections of letters associated with the Capuan school. Writers represented in these collections include Henry of Isernia, Nicola della Rocca, Terrisio di Atina and Thomas of Gaeta.

The idea of a "Capuan school" has come under criticism. Fulvio Delle Donne argues that rather than a school there was only a "social–rhetorical network". Elisabetta Bartoli considers the "historiographic category that is now obsolete".

== Bibliography ==
- Abulafia, David (1988). Frederick II: A Medieval Emperor. Allen Lane.
- Bartoli, Elisabetta (2024). "The Art of Letter-Writing: A Medieval Latin Invention". In Francesco Stella; Lucie Doležalová; Danuta Shanzer (eds.). Latin Literatures of Medieval and Early Modern Times in Europe and Beyond: A Millennium Heritage. John Benjamins. pp. 507–522.
- Brunetti, Giuseppina (2005). "Epistolografia e retorica". Enciclopedia Federiciana. Treccani.
- Delle Donne, Fulvio (2015). "Le dictamen capouan: écoles rhétoriques et conventions historiographiques". In Grévin, Benoît; Turcan-Verkerk, Anne-Marie (eds.). Le dictamen dans tous ses états: Perspectives de recherche sur la théorie et la pratique de l'ars dictaminis (XI^{e}–XV^{e} siècles). Brepols. pp. 191–207. doi:10.1484/M.BHCMA_EB.5.105481.
- Grévin, Benoît; Turcan-Verkerk, Anne-Marie, eds. (2015). Le dictamen dans tous ses états: Perspectives de recherche sur la théorie et la pratique de l'ars dictaminis (XI^{e}–XV^{e} siècles). Brepols.
- Haskins, Charles H. (1928). "Latin Literature under Frederick II". Speculum. 3 (2): 129–151.
- Kantorowicz, Ernst (1957) [1931]. Frederick the Second, 1194–1250. Translated by E. O. Lorimer. Frederick Ungar.
- Tichenor, Morris (2017). "Review of Grévin & Turcan-Verkerk 2015". The Journal of Medieval Latin. 27: 347–349. JSTOR 48501731.
