= Scaligeria =

Scaligeria may refer to:

- Scaligeria (fly), a genus of flies in the family Sarcophagidae
- Scaligeria (plant), a genus of plants in the family Apiaceae
