= Quilichinus of Spoleto =

First page of Quilichinus' Alexandreis in a 15th-century manuscript

Quilichinus of Spoleto (fl. 1236–1237) was an Italian judge, poet and supporter of Emperor Frederick II. His major work is the Latin poem Alexandreis (or Historia Alexandri Magni) in elegiac distichs. It is based on the J^{3} recension of the Latin Alexander Romance, a collection of legends about Alexander the Great. To this base, he added a prologue and a dialogue between the poet and God. It is divided into four books of unequal length. The Alexandreis survives in about twenty manuscripts, the four earliest from the 14th century.

The final sixteen verses of the Alexandreis, which have the heading De dictatore huius historie ('on the writer of this history') are the only source on the life of Quilichinus. He calls himself a judge by profession and born of Spoletan stock. Some manuscripts contain the additional claim that he was born in Recanati. He completed the work in 1236 but edited the following year, completing it after Frederick II's victory in the battle of Cortenuova on 27 November 1237. Since he hews closely to the J^{3} version of the Romance and manuscripts of that recension are only known from a century later, the date of his work is the terminus ante quem (latest possible date) for the production of J^{3} recension.

In the final lines of the Alexandreis, Quilichinus claims to have also written a preconia principis, an elegy of Frederick. The poem Cesar, Auguste, multum mirabilis has sometimes been identified as that elegy, since it is found in one manuscript alongside the Alexandreis. The modern consensus, however, is that the Cesar, Auguste was written by Terrisio di Atina. Likewise erroneous are the attributions to Quilichinus of the poem De providentia divina and of the ars dictaminis entitled Pomerium rethorice by Quichilino da Spello. Quilichinus' elegy appears to be lost.

The Alexandreis is an unpolished work, although Quilichinus occasionally adapted phrases from Boethius. Its division into four books was meant to emphasis Alexander's several royal titles, which paralleled those of Frederick II, who was king of Germany, Italy and Sicily as well as emperor. In the early 14th century, it was translated into Italian verse by Domenico Scolari. Later that century, a German verse translation appeared, the Wernigerode Alexander.

Quilichinus is the first author to apply the name "Tartars" to the Mongols when describing the peoples enclosed behind the Caspian Gates by Alexander.

== Sources ==
- Delle Donne, Fulvio (2016). "Quilichino da Spoleto". Dizionario Biografico degli Italiani (in Italian). Vol. 86: Querenghi–Rensi. Rome: Istituto dell'Enciclopedia Italiana. ISBN 978-88-12-00032-6.
- Delle Donne, Fulvio (2021). "Quilichinus Spoletinus". Encyclopedia of the Medieval Chronicle Online. Brill. doi:10.1163/2213-2139_emc_SIM_02131.
- Dillon, John B. (2004). "Quilichino of Spoleto". In Christopher Kleinhenz (ed.). Medieval Italy: An Encyclopedia. Vol. 2. Routledge. p. 941.
- Dionisotti, A. C. (1988). "The Letter of Mardochaeus the Jew to Alexander the Great: A Lecture in Memory of Arnaldo Momigliano". Journal of the Warburg and Courtauld Institutes. 51 (1): 1–13. JSTOR 751260.
- Hautala, Roman (2015). "Latin Sources' Information About the Mongols Related to Their Re-conquest of Transcaucasia". Golden Horde Review. 3: 6–22.
- Thomson, S. Harrison (1935). "The Preconia Frederici II of Quilichinus of Spoleto". Speculum. 10 (4): 386–393. doi:10.2307/2846775. JSTOR 2846775.
