= Historia Alexandri Magni =

Historia Alexandri Magni may refer to:

- Histories of Alexander the Great by Quintus Curtius Rufus
- Alexander Romance by Pseudo-Callisthenes
  - Historia de preliis, translation by Leo the Archpriest
- Alexandreis by Quilichinus of Spoleto
