= Julius Caesar Scaliger =

Italian scholar, physician and philosopher (1484–1558)

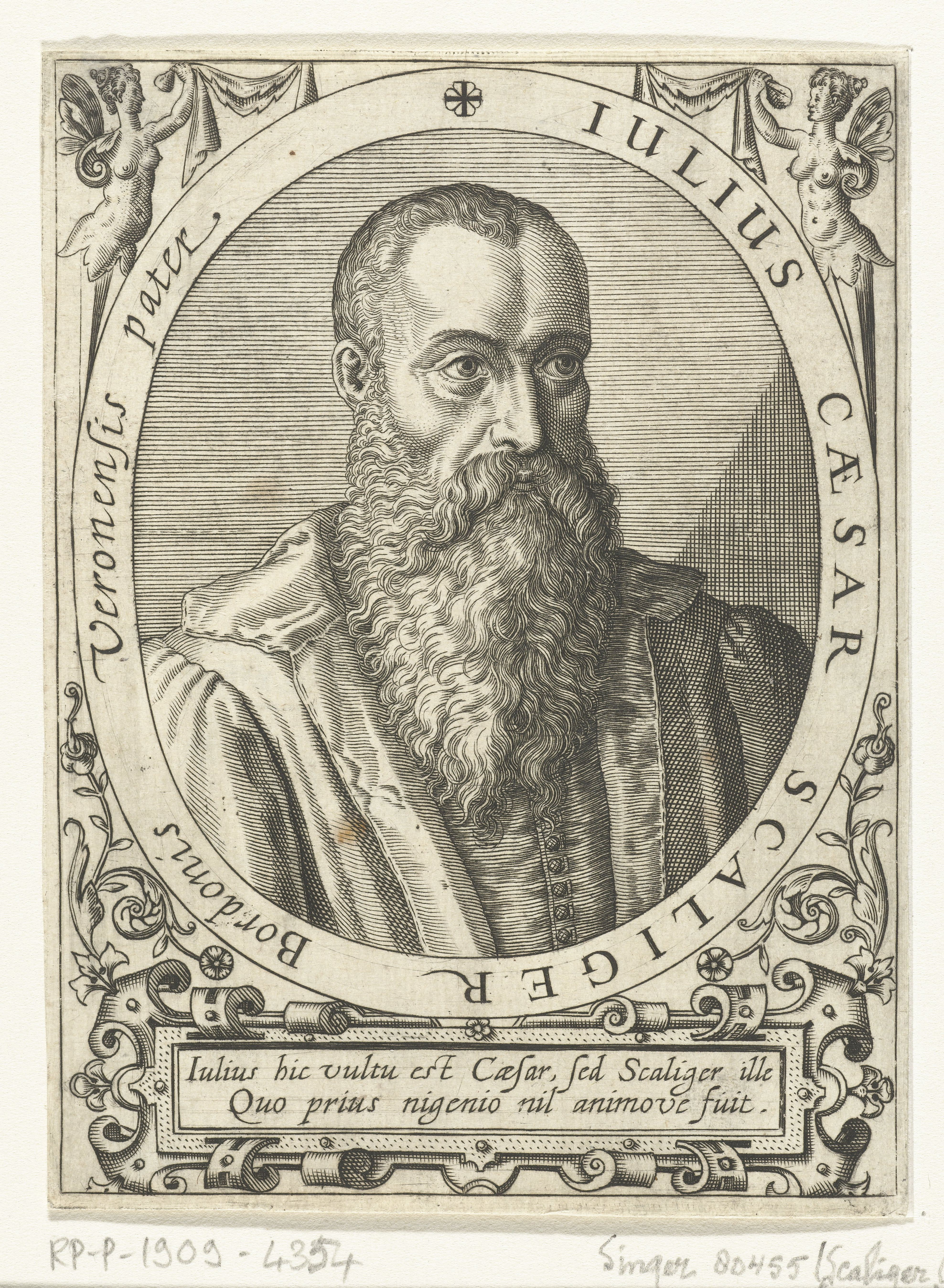
Julius Caesar Scaliger

Julius Caesar Scaliger (/ˈskælɪdʒər/; 23 April or August 1484 – 21 October 1558), or Giulio Cesare della Scala, was an Italian scholar and physician, who spent a major part of his career in France. He employed the techniques and discoveries of Renaissance humanism to defend Aristotelianism against the New Learning. In spite of his contentious disposition, his contemporary reputation was high. Jacques Auguste de Thou claimed that none of the ancients could be placed above him and that he had no equal in his own time.

== Biography ==
Scaliger's father, Benedetto Bordone, was a miniaturist and illuminator. Scaliger himself was known in his youth by the family name Bordone, but later insisted that he was a scion of the house of La Scala, for a hundred and fifty years lords of Verona. He was born in Padua on 23 April or August 1484, though his son later claimed that he was born at the Rocca di Riva, on Lake Garda.

There are two accounts of his life, his own and that of his critics.

=== His own account ===
When he was twelve, his kinsman the emperor Maximilian placed him among his pages. He remained for seventeen years in the service of the emperor, distinguishing himself as a soldier and as a captain. He also studied art under Albrecht Dürer.

In 1512 at the Battle of Ravenna, where his father and elder brother were killed, his conduct earned him Order of the Golden Spur, augmented with the collar and the eagle of gold.

He left the service of Maximilian, and after a brief employment by another kinsman, the duke of Ferrara, he decided to quit the military life, and in 1514 entered as a student at the University of Bologna. He decided to take holy orders, expecting that he would become cardinal, and then pope, when he would wrest from the Venetians his duchy of Verona, which the republic had taken from his ancestors. He soon gave up this plan, but remained at the university until 1519.

The next six years he passed at the castle of Vico Nuovo, in Piedmont, as a guest of the Della Rovere, at first dividing his time between military expeditions in the summer, and study, chiefly of medicine and natural history, in the winter, until a severe attack of rheumatic gout brought his military career to a close. Henceforth his life was wholly devoted to study. In 1525 he accompanied Antonio della Rovera, bishop of Agen, to that city as his physician.

=== Later account ===
It was not until some time after his death that the enemies of his son first alleged that he was not of the family of La Scala, but was the son of Benedetto Bordone, an illuminator or schoolmaster of Verona; that he was educated at Padua, where he took the degree of M.D.; and that the story of his life before arriving at Agen was pure invention. It is supported by no other evidence than his own statements, some of which are inconsistent with well-ascertained facts.

=== Life at Agen ===
The remaining thirty-two years of his life were passed almost wholly at Agen. On his death in 1558 he had a high scientific and literary reputation, though his books gave rise to disputes. He was charged with heresy in 1538 but was acquitted, one of the judges being his friend Arnoul Le Ferron.

== Works ==
In 1531 he printed his first oration against Erasmus, in defence of Cicero and the Ciceronians (Oratio pro Cicerone contra Erasmum, Paris 1531), dismissing Erasmus as a literary parasite, a mere corrector of texts. It is notable for its vigorous invective and, like his subsequent writings, its excellent Latin. It has been said of it, however, that it misses the point of his opponent's treatise Ciceronianus. Erasmus did not reply, thinking it was the work of a personal enemy, Meander. Scaliger then wrote a second oration (published in 1536), also full of invective. The orations were followed by a large amount of Latin verse, which appeared in successive volumes in 1533, 1534, 1539, 1546 and 1547. This verse appeared in numerous editions, but was less appreciated by later critics. (One of them, Mark Pattison, agreed with the judgment of Pierre Daniel Huet, who said: "par ses poésies brutes et informes Scaliger a déshonoré le Parnasse".) He also published a brief tract on comic metres (De comicis dimensionibus) and a work De causis linguae Latinae (Lyons 1540; Geneva 1580; Frankfurt 1623), in which he analyzes the style of Cicero and indicates 634 mistakes of Lorenzo Valla and his humanist predecessors, claimed to be the earliest Latin grammar using scientific principles and method. He published no other purely literary works in his lifetime.

His Poetices libri septem ("Seven books on Poetics", Lyons 1561; Leyden 1581) appeared after his death. They contained many paradoxes and some elements of personal animosity (especially in his reference to Étienne Dolet), but also contain acute criticism based on the Poetics of Aristotle, "imperator noster; omnium bonarum artium dictator perpetuus" ("our Emperor, dictator forever of all good qualities in the arts"), an influential treatise in the history of literary criticism. Like many of his generation Scaliger prized Virgil above Homer. His praise of the tragedies of Seneca over those of the Greeks influenced both Shakespeare and Pierre Corneille.

Scaliger intended to be judged primarily as a philosopher and a man of science and regarded classical studies as a means of relaxation. He was noted for his powers of observation and his tenacious memory. His scientific writings are all in the form of commentaries. It was not until he was seventy that (with the exception of a brief tract on the De insomniis of Hippocrates) he felt that any of them were ready for publication. In 1556 he printed his Dialogue on the De plantis attributed to Aristotle, and in 1557 his Exotericarum exercitationum ("Exoteric Exercises", or simply Exercitationes) on Gerolamo Cardano's De Subtilitate. His other scientific works, commentaries on Theophrastus' De causis plantarum and Aristotle's History of Animals, he left in a more or less unfinished state, and they were not printed until after his death.

His work shows no sign of the inductive reasoning attributed to the scientific method. Unlike his contemporary Konrad von Gesner, he was not led by his botanical studies to a natural system of classification. He rejected the discoveries of Copernicus. He was guided by Aristotle in metaphysics and in natural history and by Galen in medicine, but did not follow them uncritically.

He is best known for his critical Exotericarum Exercitationes on Cardan's De Subtilitate (1557), a book approaching natural philosophy and which had a long popularity. The Exercitationes display encyclopaedic knowledge and accurate observation; but, as noted by Gabriel Naudé, they are not flawless. They had an influence upon natural historians, philosophers and scientists such as Lipsius, Francis Bacon, Gottfried Wilhelm Leibniz and Johannes Kepler. Charles Nisard wrote that Scaliger's object seems to be to deny all that Cardan affirms and to affirm all that Cardan denies. Yet Leibniz and Sir William Hamilton recognize him as the best modern exponent of the physics and metaphysics of Aristotle.

=== Editions ===
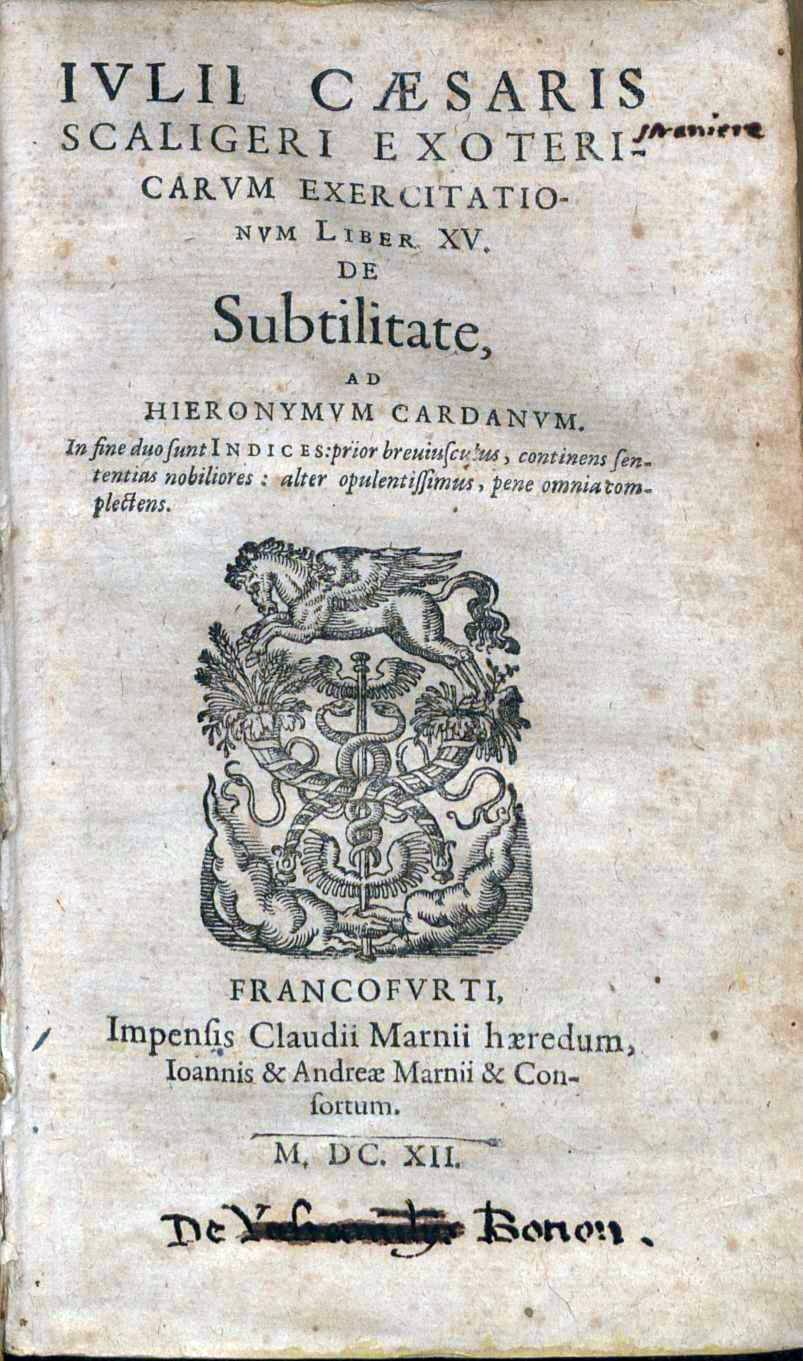
De subtilitate, 1612

- De subtilitate (in Latin). Frankfurt am Main: eredi Claude de Marne. 1612.
- In libros De plantis Aristoteli inscriptos commentarii (in Latin). Lyon: Guillaume Rouillé. 1566.

== Family ==
A few days after his arrival at Agen he fell in love with an orphan of thirteen, Andiette de Roques Lobejac; she was a distant relative of the aristocratic house of Rochepozay (also Roche-Pozay or Roche-Posay), associates of Jacques Auguste de Thou, one of Scaliger's close friends and supporters. Her friends objected to her marriage, as he was then undistinguished. By 1528 he was a successful physician and at forty-five he married Andiette, who was then sixteen. The marriage lasted for twenty-nine years and produced fifteen children, including Joseph Justus Scaliger.

== Honours ==
In 1829, botanist Augustin Pyramus de Candolle published Scaligeria, a genus of flowering plants from Europe and Asia, belonging to the family Apiaceae and named in Julius Caesar Scaliger's honour.

== See also ==
- Distichs of Cato
- Nostradamus (1994 film)
