= Terrisio di Atina =

Terrisio di Atina (fl. 1237–1246), in Latin Terrisius, was an Italian professor and rhetorician at the University of Naples. He was a supporter of Frederick II, Holy Roman Emperor, and connected with his court. All of his surviving writings are letters, both real and fictive, with the exception of one poem in praise of the emperor.

== Life ==
Terrisio was from Atina, part of the land of the abbey of Montecassino after 1194. He was probably born in the early years of the 13th century. Nothing is known of his family background. It is unlikely that he is the same person as the Terrisio who was preceptor of the Hospitallers in Apulia in 1231.

Terrisio probably received his main education locally. He is often called magister (teacher), but this title was used broadly and did not necessarily denote an academic degree. He also calls himself 'doctor', a title which implies a completed university education. He probably studied law at the University of Bologna, since around 1240 he wrote a letter of condolence on the death of Bene da Firenze addressed to the students and faculty of Bologna. Bene may have been his teacher.

The contemporary chronicler Richard of San Germano probably knew Terrisio personally. In early 1237, according to Richard's chronicle, the Emperor Frederick II ordered several bishops to conduct an investigation into the suitability for office of Pandolfo da Santo Stefano, recently elected abbot of Montecassino. The bishops entrusted the task to Taddeo da Sessa. Terrisio carried Taddeo's report to the bishops and probably presented it orally as well.

Terrisio taught at the University of Naples, founded by Frederick II in 1224. He would have owed his appointment to the emperor, whose prerogative it was. His involvement with the investigation of Montecassino and his writings down to 1246 indicate close connections with Frederick's court. In his letter of condolence to his colleagues on the death of one of their own, the philosopher Arnaldus Catalanus, he refers to himself modestly as "the least among the doctors" of Naples.

The necrology of Montecassino contains an entry for Nicholas, "son of Master Terrisio", under 21 December. The year of his son's death is unknown but he clearly predeceased his father. Terrisio himself may have added his name to the necrology. There is no mention of Terrisio after 1246 but his date of death is unknown.

== Works ==
=== Letters ===
Terrisio belonged to the Capuan school of rhetoric. He wrote a joking letter to his students in Naples, connecting his name to the word 'terror' and asking to be appeased with gifts, especially of capons, during Carnival. The letter ends in a brief poem. The two letters of condolence for the deaths of Bene da Firenze and Arnaldus Catalanus end in Leonine verse. Some of Terrisio's own philosophical views can be gleaned from the latter. He asserts that "nature is not its own law" (Discite quod natura sui iuris non est) and that "the stars can do nothing in themselves" (Discite quod per se nihil sydera possunt).

Terrisio wrote a fictional correspondence between the professors of Naples and two prostitutes, Alessandrina and Papiana. In the first letter, the prostitutes present themselves as holding professorships of carnal pleasure and request precedence over the reverend doctors, whose tuition charges leave the student unable to afford their services. The doctors in response reject the request and accuse the prostitutes of leaving their students naked. This fictional correspondence made its way into several collections of dictamina (model letters).

=== Imperialist writings ===
Terrisio was a partisan of the emperor in the conflict with the cities and with the Papacy. His writings were fully in line with imperial propaganda and the doctrine of lex animata (emperor as embodiment of the law).

Between the spring of 1239 and the summer of 1240, Terrisio wrote an elegy of Frederick II known by its incipit as Cesar, Auguste, multum mirabilis. It is also sometimes called the Preconia Frederici II. It contains eighty verses in twenty quatrains. The first half of the poem praises the emperor while the second half satirically criticizes corruption at his court, blaming abuses and injustices on corrupt officials and absolving the emperor. Nevertheless, the poet seeks reform. This poem has at times been misattributed to Quilichino da Spoleto. It is expressly attributed to Terrisio in the Fitalia Codex.

In 1246, with imperial permission, Terrisio wrote to Count Raymond VII of Toulouse to describe how Frederick defeated the conspiracy of Capaccio and executed the ringleaders. He likens Frederick to Christ betrayed by Judas. Even Nature itself, in its four elements (earth, air, water and fire), condemns the conspirators, who were executed by dragging, hanging, drowning and burning.

=== Uncertain attributions ===
The Contentio de nobilitate generis et probitate animi is a "dispute on the nobility of lineage and integrity of the soul" addressed to Pier della Vigna and Taddeo da Sessa. It is alluded to by Dante Alighieri in his Convivio. Its author is identified by the initial T in one manuscript, but its attribution to Terrisio is uncertain.

A fictitious letter in which the animals thank the emperor for cancelling hunting season may be by Terrisio.

== Bibliography ==
- D'Angelo, Edoard (2005). "Terrisio di Atina". Federico II: Enciclopedia fridericiana. Vol. 2. Rome: Istituto dell'Enciclopedia Italiana. pp. 822–824.
- Delle Donne, Fulvio (2019). "Terrisio di Atina". Dizionario Biografico degli Italiani (in Italian). Vol. 95: Taranto–Togni. Rome: Institute of the Italian Encyclopaedia. ISBN 978-88-12-00032-6.
- Haskins, Charles H. (1928). "Latin Literature under Frederick II". Speculum. 3 (2): 129–151.
- Mercati, Giovanni (1938). "Conjectures upon the Text of the Preconia Frederici II". Speculum. 13 (2): 237–239. doi:10.2307/2848408.
- Morpurgo, Pietro (1994). "Philosophia naturalis at the Court of Frederick II: From the Theological Method to the ratio secundum physicam in Michael Scot's De Anima". Studies in the History of Art. 44: 241–248. JSTOR 42621912.
- Thomson, S. Harrison (1935). "The Preconia Frederici II of Quilichinus of Spoleto". Speculum. 10 (4): 386–393. doi:10.2307/2846775. JSTOR 2846775.
- Torraca, Francesco (1925). "Maestro Terrisio di Atina". Aneddoti di storia letteraria. Il Solco. pp. 33–59. Originally published in Archivio storico per le province napoletane 37 (1911): 231–242
