= Ciceronianism =

Giovanni Domenico Ferretti, Cicero's Commentators, before 1751, Capoliveri, priv. col.

Ciceronianism was the tendency among the Renaissance humanists to imitate the language and style of Cicero (106–43 BC) and hold it up as a model of Latin. The term was coined in the 19th century from the much older term ciceronianus, "a Ciceronian". That term is contrasted with christianus (Christian) in Jerome in the 4th century. Erasmus employs it the same way in the title of his dialogue Ciceronianus (1528). During the Renaissance, however, the term could have both positive and negative connotations, depending on whether slavish or creative imitation was in view.

Cicero's writing was already considered classical by Quintilian in the 1st century. He was admired for his style in the Middle Ages but only his De inventione and Topica were widely known, and his language had little influence on Medieval Latin. His rise to preeminence began with Petrarch's discovery of the Epistulae ad Atticum in 1345 and with the discovery of De oratore, Orator, and Brutus by Gerardo Landriani in 1421. It culminated in Pietro Bembo establishing a Ciceronian style for official papal documents in the 16th century. By that time, there was also a robust anti-Ciceronianism, as exemplified by Erasmus' Ciceronianus. Against Erasmsus, Julius Caesar Scaliger wrote his Oratio pro Cicerone contra Desiderium Erasmum ('Speech for Cicero against Erasmus', 1531–1537) and Étienne Dolet his pamphlet Erasmianus (1535).

Anti-Ciceronianism was in practice often just moderate Ciceronianism opposed to radical or strict Ciceronianism. In his dispute of 1485 with Paolo Cortesi, who took Cicero to be the sole model to which Neo-Latin authors should look, Angelo Poliziano labelled the radical Ciceronians simii Ciceronis, 'apes of Cicero'. In general, radicals looked to Cicero primarily or only as a model of language. Anti-Ciceronianism, strongest in Germany, criticized such reliance on a pagan author as incompatible with a Christian age. By the time of Petrus Ramus' Ciceronianus (1577), Ciceronianism was fading and Tacitism, a new trend toward later Latin authors, such as Tacitus, was ascendant.

== List of Renaissance Ciceronians ==
- Pietro Bembo
- Guillaume Budé
- Paolo Cortesi
- Sebastián Fox Morcillo
- Christophe de Longueil
- Mario Nizolio
- Jacopo Sadoleto
- Marco Girolamo Vida
