= Paolo Cortesi =

Paolo Cortesi or Cortese, in Latin Paulus Cortesius or de Cortesii (1465–1510), was a Renaissance humanist from Rome. He is known for his Ciceronianism, his dispute over literary style with Angelo Poliziano in 1485 and his treatise on the cardinalate, De cardinalatu.

== Life ==
Cortesi was born in Rome in the first half of 1465 to Antonio Cortesi and Tita Aldobrandini. His father was a papal abbreviator from San Gimignano, although his family was originally from Pavia. His mother belonged to the Aldobrandini family of Florence. His father and elder brother, Alessandro (1460–1490), oversaw his education. With Alessandro, he visited many famous Roman men of learning in his youth, including Giulio Pomponio Leto, Lucio Fazini and Bartolomeo Platina.

His brother arranged for him to succeed the late Platina as a scribe in the papal chancery in October 1481, when he was in his seventeenth year. In his Liber notarum, Johann Burchard records Cortesi as a papal scribe as late as 23 May 1497. In the 1490s, the Cortsi house was frequented by poets and men of letters. Among those that visited the home were Serafino Aquilano, Giovanni Lorenzi, Manilius Cabacius Rallus, Pietro Gravina di Palermo, Leonardo Corvino, Michael Tarchaniota Marullus, Giacomo Corso and Bartolomeo Lampridio (uncle of Benedetto Lampridio).

On 7 April 1498, Pope Alexander VI named Cortesi an apostolic secretary. He resigned his post on 8 June 1503, retiring to a villa he had built on the ruins of an old castle in San Gimignano. He continued to receive a steady stream of visitors. He lived the rest of his life there and never visited Rome again. He nurtured hopes of being named a cardinal, but never was. He died in 1510, before 15 November. His heir was his son Alessandro, born out of wedlock but legitimized by Cardinal Francesco Soderini in March 1507. His executors were his surviving brother, Lattanzio Cortesi, and Girolamo Ridolfi.

== Works ==
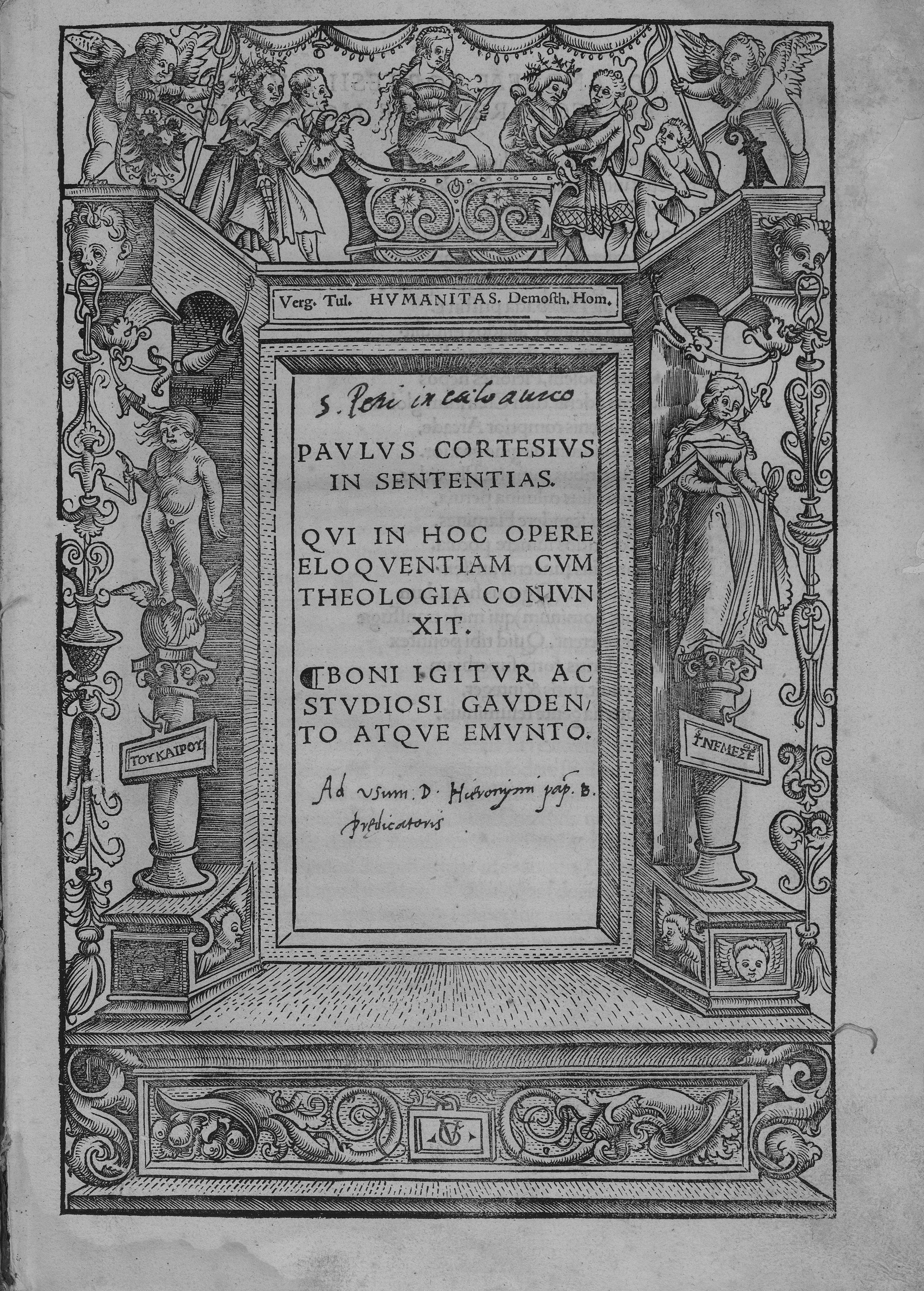
In quatuor libros Sententiarum

Sometime after 1481, Cortesi wrote the Historia vera Hippolyti de Bondelmontibus et Deianirae de Bardis, a Latin prose adaptation of Leon Battista Alberti's Historietta amorosa fra Leonora de' Bardi e Ippolito Buondelmonti, a telling of the legend of Dianora and Ippolito.

Cortesi came to prominence in 1485 through a dispute with Angelo Poliziano. He sent Poliziano a collection of Latin letters with the intent to publish and asked the elder humanist his opinion of their quality. Poliziano advised against publication, since the letter's so slavishly imitated Cicero in style. Cortesi responded with a long, polemical letter in defence of his style.

In 1490–1491, Cortesi wrote a dialogue, De hominibus doctis (On Learned Men), modelled on Cicero's Brutus and dedicated to Lorenzo de' Medici. It depicts Cortesi, Alessandro Farnese (the future Pope Paul III) and a certain Antonio (possibly Giovanni Antonio Sulpicio da Veroli) on the island of Bisentina on Lake Bolsena. The main purpose of their discussion is to provide Cortesi an opportunity to write a literary history. He surveys 93 writers, including Chrysoloras, Dante, Boccaccio and Petrarch. He ignores contemporary Florentines and assesses all in terms of their adherence to Ciceronian norms. The theories expounded are those of his letter to Poliziano. Although it was used and cited repeatedly in manuscript, De hominibus doctis was not published until 1729.

In 1504, Cortesi published at Rome In quatuor libros Sententiarum ... disputationes, "an attempt to elimintate the dissidence between theological wisdom and profane eloquence". The apotheosis of the Ciceronianism expressed in the letter to Poliziano, it was dedicated to Pope Julius II. It was reprinted in 1513 by Jodocus Badius at Paris and by Johann Froben at Basel, and again at Basel in 1540 by Henricus Petrus.

One of Cortesi's last works, De astrologia, is unpublished and preserved in single manuscript. Giovanni Pontano cites it in his De rebus coelestibus and in Urania he indicates awareness of Cortesi's astronomical studies.

Cortesi's last work and his magnum opus is De cardinalatu, published posthumously in 1510 by Simeone Nardi of Siena. It is dedicated to Julius II and has three prefaces by Cortesi, by Raffaele Maffei and by the monk Severus of Piacenza. It consists of 34 chapters in three books. It is a mirror of princes for a prince of the Church. Although Cortesi had expressed a desire to write a secular mirror along the lines of Xenophon's Cyropaedia, he may have been influenced to change his scope by his desire for a prelacy.

In the first book, ethicus et contemplativus, Cortesi outlines the virtues and knowledge necessary for a cardinal. In the second, oeconomicus, he describes the manners and lifestyle appropriate to a cardinal with many anecdotes. He even gives architectural advice concerning cardinalatial palaces. In the third, politicus, concerns the responsibilities of a cardinal's office, presenting many example problems and solutions. De cardinalatu was well received in ecclesiastical circles.

Besides his Latin writings, Cortesi wrote some works in vernacular Italian, including:

- a vernacular sonnet sent to Piero di Lorenzo de' Medici in 1493
- seven strambotti published in the Compendio de cose nove of Vincenzo Calmeta in 1507
- Carmina vulgaria, a collection of poems preserved in two manuscripts

== Bibliography ==
- Chambers, David S. (2010). "The Renaissance Cardinalate: From Paolo Cortesi's De cardinalatu to the Present". In Mary Hollingsworth; Carol M. Richardson (eds.). The Possessions of a Cardinal: Politics, Piety, and Art, 1450–1700. Penn State University Press. pp. 17–24.
- D'Amico, John F. (1984). "The Progress of Renaissance Latin Prose: The Case of Apuleianism". Renaissance Quarterly. 37 (3): 351–392. doi:10.2307/2860955.
- Jackson, Philippa (2011). "Investing in Curial Offices: The Case of the Apostolic Secretary Paolo Cortesi". Mantova e il rinascimento italiano: Studi in onore di David S. Chambers (PDF). Editoriale Sometti. pp. 315–328 (1–14).
- McLaughlin, Martin (1996). Literary Imitation in the Italian Renaissance: The Theory and Practice of Literary Imitation in Italy from Dante to Bembo. Oxford University Press.
- McLaughlin, Martin (2002). "Cortesi, Paolo". In Peter Hainsworth; David Robey (eds.). The Oxford Companion to Italian Literature. Oxford University Press.
- Ricciardi, Roberto (1983). "Cortesi, Paolo". Dizionario Biografico degli Italiani (in Italian). Vol. 29: Cordier–Corvo. Rome: Istituto dell'Enciclopedia Italiana. ISBN 978-88-12-00032-6.
- Schirg, Bernhard (2017). "Cortese's Ideal Cardinal? Praising Art, Spendour and Magnificence in Bernardino de Carvajal's Roman Residence". Journal of the Warburg and Courtauld Institutes. 80 (1): 61–82. doi:10.1086/JWCI44841044.
- Weil-Garris, Kathleen; D'Amico, John F. (1980). "The Renaissance Cardinal's Ideal Palace: A Chapter from Cortesi's De Cardinalatu". Memoirs of the American Academy in Rome. 35 (1): 45–123. JSTOR 4238680.
