= Ciceronianus =

Treatise by Erasmus of Rotterdam

Ciceronianus ("The Ciceronian") is a treatise written by Desiderius Erasmus and published in 1528. It attacks Ciceronianism, a style of scholarly Latin that closely imitated Cicero's style and voice. Many Ciceronians even refused to use specific words, even specific verb forms, if Cicero's writings did not include them verbatim. The Ciceronians validated this dogmatic approach by insisting that Cicero's style was the best style of Latin. In the 16th century, this style was popular among Renaissance humanists who wanted to recover Classical Latin. Erasmus also sought to defend medieval Latinists whose allegedly barbarous style the Ciceronians had ridiculed.

While Erasmus published many works on literary topics, some scholars view Ciceronianus as his greatest contribution to literary criticism.

== Content ==
In Ciceronianus, Erasmus attacks Ciceronianism through his depiction of the character Nosoponus, a Ciceronian fanatic. The treatise takes the form of a dialogue between the Nosoponus and his opponent Bulephorus, who represents Erasmus's view. Bulephorus's views are supported by Hypologus.

Erasmus adopts an intentionally entertaining and satirical style. Nosoponus is proud that he has not read any author other than Cicero in seven years, and he is compiling a lexicon of Cicero's words and phrases to help him in only using Cicero's exact style. In the dialogue, Nosoponus's writing is comically laborious: he takes six nights to write a letter that contains six sentences, then revises it ten times and sets it aside for examination later. When Bulephorus objects to taking this long, Nosoponus replies that he avoids conversation as much as possible. Ciceronians are portrayed as having to write their ultra-sterilised prose in soundproof rooms to avoid any violation by real life, especially the distressingly vulgar speech of children and women.

Erasmus focuses on two main Ciceronian tenets: the idea that Cicero is the absolute standard for the Latin language and the idea that proper Latin style is only attainable through direct imitation of Cicero. Erasmus believed that strictly imitating Cicero to the exclusion of other writers, styles, and modern vocabulary turned Latin into a dead language rather than a living and evolving means of international intellectual communication.

Some Ciceronian extremists, refusing to use words that Cicero had not used, resorted to pagan words and names to express Christian theological concepts, using, for example, "Jupiter Maximus" for God and "Apollo" for Jesus. Erasmus saw Cicero's Latin as pagan, and therefore unsuited to translating holy texts. He argues that Latin must adapt to the times or become "utterly ridiculous". He also asserts that if Cicero had been a Christian, he would have adapted his language to use Christian names and Biblical concepts.

== Response ==
Erasmus's Ciceronian contemporaries rejected Ciceronianus. In 1531, Julius Caesar Scaliger printed his first oration defending Cicero and the Ciceronians from Erasmus, Oratio pro M. Tullio Cicerone contra Des. Erasmum. Scaliger dismissed Erasmus as "a literary parasite, a mere corrector of texts". In 1535, Étienne Dolet also published a riposte, Erasmianus, defending Ciceronian Latin, and, eight years after Erasmus's death, in 1544, the Italian scholar Giulio Camillo criticized Erasmus's views in Trattato dell’ Imitatione.

Modern scholars have called Ciceronianus "extremely violent" in its literary and theological points of view and "a major chapter in a searing polemic" under a "light and genial surface".
