= Benedetto Bordone =

Venetian cartographer (died 1531)

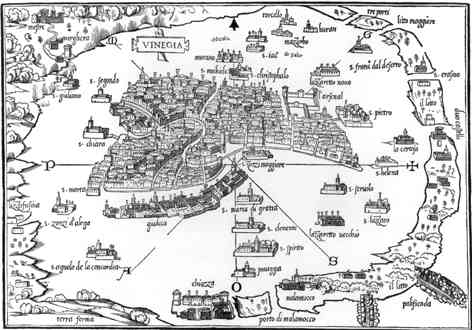
Chart of Venice by Bordone

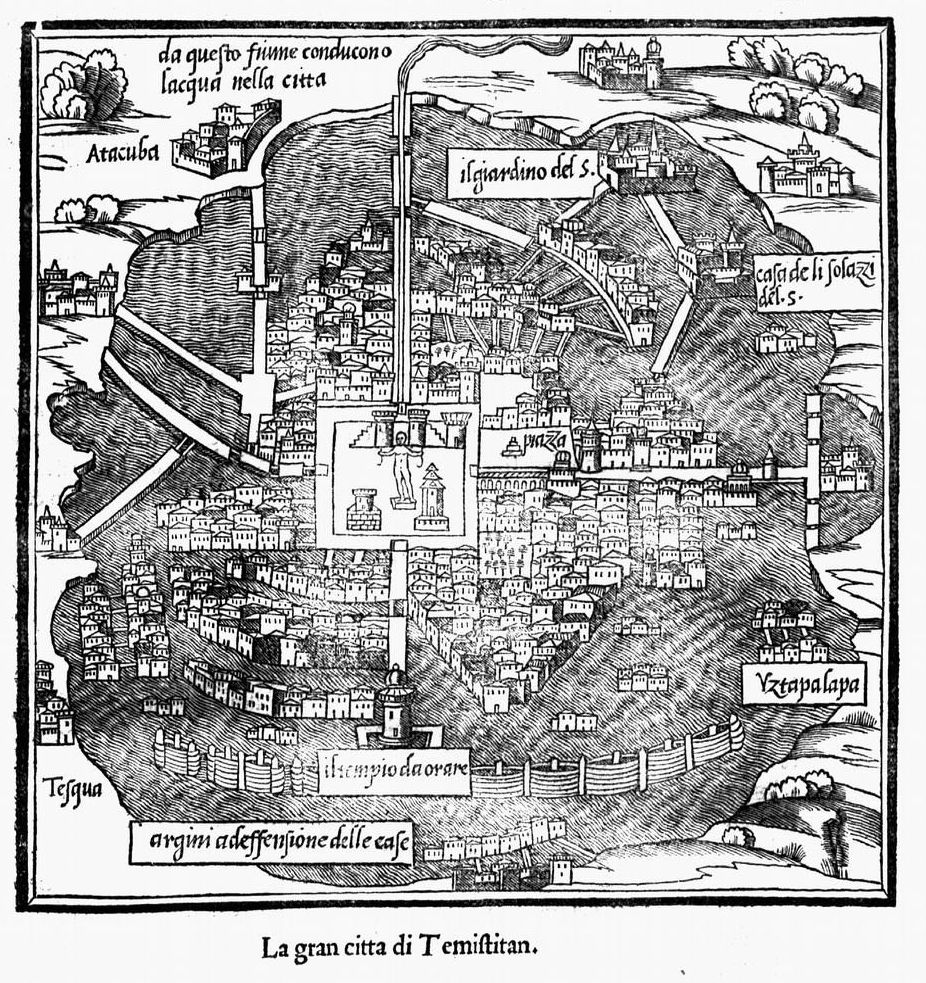
"Map of Temistitan" (Tenochtitlan)

Benedetto Bordone (died 1531) was a Venetian manuscript editor, miniaturist and cartographer. He was born in Padua, then part of the Republic of Venice. His date of birth is unknown but his parents were married in Padua in 1442 and he was married there in 1480.

His most famous work is the Isolario (The Book of Islands, "where we discuss all islands of the world, with their ancient and modern names, histories, tales and way of living..."), in which he describes all the islands of the known world, detailing their folklore, myths, cultures, climates, situations, and history. Printed in Venice in 1528, the work is an example of a cartographic genre popular in Italy during the 15th and 16th centuries. It is intended as an illustrated guide for sailors and attempts to include all the new transatlantic discoveries.

Isolario contains an oval depiction of the world, a type of map invented by Bordone and formalized into the equal-area elliptical Mollweide projection three centuries later. Bordone's map shows a very distorted Mondo Novo (New World), displaying only the northern regions of South America. North America, depicted as a large island, is labelled Terra del Laboratore ("Land of the worker"), almost certainly a reference to the slave trading in the area in those days and from which comes the name Labrador.

The book also contains a record of Francisco Pizarro's conquest of Peru, the earliest known printed account of this event. Of particular interest in this work are numerous woodcut maps, twelve of which relate to America. One map displays a plan of "Temistitan" (Tenochtitlan, modern Mexico City) before its destruction by Cortez. Also of interest is a map of Ciampagu, the earliest known European-printed map of Japan as an island.

Bordone is reputed to have been the father of Julius Caesar Scaliger, a classical scholar, and grandfather of Joseph Justus Scaliger, founder of the science of historical chronology. Original maps from Bordone's Isolario are prized for their historical value.

== Bibliography ==
- Isolario (1528)
  - Google Books
  - Archive.org
- Lilian Armstrong: Benedetto Bordon and the Illumination of Venetian Choirbooks around 1500: Patronage, Production, Competition. In: Wege zum illuminierten Buch. Herstellungsbedingungen für Buchmalerei in Mittelalter und früher Neuzeit. Wien 2014, S. 148-176, ISBN 978-3-205-79491-2, Online: https://e-book.fwf.ac.at/detail_object/o:521
- Anastasia Stouraiti, 'Talk, Script and Print: The Making of Island Books in Early Modern Venice', Historical Research vol. 86, no. 232 (2013), 207-229.
- Ludovica Radif, «Benedictus Bordo» in Compendium Auctorum Latinorum Medii Aevi II/2, 2005, p. 204.
