= Lawrence of Aquilegia =

Italian canon and teacher

- Lorenzo di Aquileia
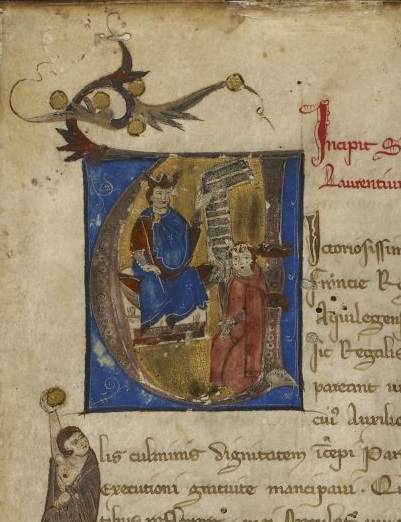
- Lawrence is shown presenting his book to Philip the Fair, King of France well known for his troubles with the Catholic Church
- Born: Before 1250; Cividale del Friuli
- Died: After 1304
- Education: Bologna
- Writing career
- Language: Latin
- Period: Middle Ages

Lawrence of Aquilegia (Lorenzo di Aquileia) was a thirteenth-century Italian canon and teacher. He is best known for his treatises on the ars dictaminis—the medieval art of letter writing. Lawrence’s major works found inspiration in Ciceronian rhetoric but introduced a new phatic element to writing and include the Summa dictaminis edita iuxta doctrinam Tullii and the Practica sive usus dictaminis edita ad utilitatem rudium. The Practica is his most popular work and characterizes his pragmatic, phatic approach to letter writing through the use of tables.

== Biographical information ==
In Cividale del Friuli in the northern Italian diocese of Aquilegia, Lawrence was born sometime before 1250. After studying the arts at Bologna (the hub of dictatorial study), he returned home and became canon of Aquilegia. As canon, Lawrence worked closely with the patriarchate, starting in 1269, where he assisted at the promulgation of the will of the recently deceased Patriarch of Aquilegia. Lawrence worked with the patriarchate until 1304, making notable appearances in the train of patriarch-elect Philip of Carinthia in 1270 and at patriarch Raimondo della Torre’s generale colloquium in 1274 (Jensen 1973).

Aside from his civic duties, Lawrence was a respected traveling teacher. He began his teaching career in the early 1280s, where medieval scholars propose he traveled first to Bologna, then sojourned in Rome, Toulouse, and Orléans (Jensen 1973). In the late 1290s, Lawrence gained popularity as a teacher in the faculty of arts at Paris. It was here that he wrote his first treatise, Summa dictaminis, and delivered it to the assembled university. The composition was well received, marking his position as a distinguished dictator (or orator) and writer on the art of letter writing (Jensen 1973). His popularity rose with his continued writing, and copies of his eight manuscripts on the theory and application of the dictaminal style were widely circulated.

Along with writing manuscripts, Lawrence combined his civic and teaching career, composing letters on behalf of the university at Paris. His most significant letter was addressed to the pope, requesting a studium of Greek, Arabic, and Tartar be established (Jensen 1973).

After a distinguished academic and civic career, scholars assume Lawrence died of old age sometime after 1304.

== Works ==
=== Summa dictaminis edita iuxta doctrinam Tullii ===
Lawrence’s first work, written at Paris and dated between 1298 and 1302, the treatise borrows from Cicero’s De inventione and the Rhetorica ad Herennium as well as from fellow dictators Buoncompagno’s Rhetorica novissima (Jensen 1973).

In the first of the treatise’s eight main parts, Lawrence defines the basic concepts related to dictaminal writing: orator, rhetor, dictatores, and dictamen. He concludes by defining the letter and its parts. Parts two through six concern a detailed description of each of the five parts of a letter: salutation, exordium, narrative, petition, and conclusion. Of the five parts, the description of the salutation is the longest, which is not surprising given the medieval preoccupation with social levels (Jensen 1973). In parts seven and eight, Lawrence concludes his work with the colours of rhetoric and strategies for embellishment, respectively.

=== Summa dictaminis breviter et artificiose composita secundum stilum Romane curie et consuetudinem modernorum (undated) ===
Also written at Paris, this second work is simpler and shorter than his first. Lawrence intended the work for “novices eager to learn dictamen” (Jensen 1973), and its simplicity contributed to its popularity.

Like its predecessor, this work defines dictamen and the five parts of the letter—known as the “Approved Format” of the time (Murphy 1974). Again, the bulk of the work concerns the salutation, with thirty-seven chapters devoted to salutations for different social levels (i.e. writing to the Pope, writing to a king, writing to a farmer, writing to a scholar). Lawrence covers the other parts of the letter only briefly. He ends his work with a discussion of stylistic vices.

=== Practica sive usus dictaminis edita ad utilitatem rudium (undated) ===
Lawrence’s most popular work arranges forms of address to people of various social levels in tabular form. Seven tables (one for each class of persons) offer examples of salutations, narratives, petitions, and conclusions (see images 1 and 2 below). The Practica’s formulaic, pragmatic approach to letter writing not only contributed to its popularity but also represents the “mechanistic dead end” (Perelman 1991) of the ars dictaminis. By following the tables, anyone “capable of copying individual letters of the alphabet” (Murphy 1974) could compose a letter to an addressee of a particular social class. The Practica “struck a responsive chord” (Murphy 1974), as no formal artistic training or rhetorical command of language was necessary to write a letter following Lawrence’s tables.

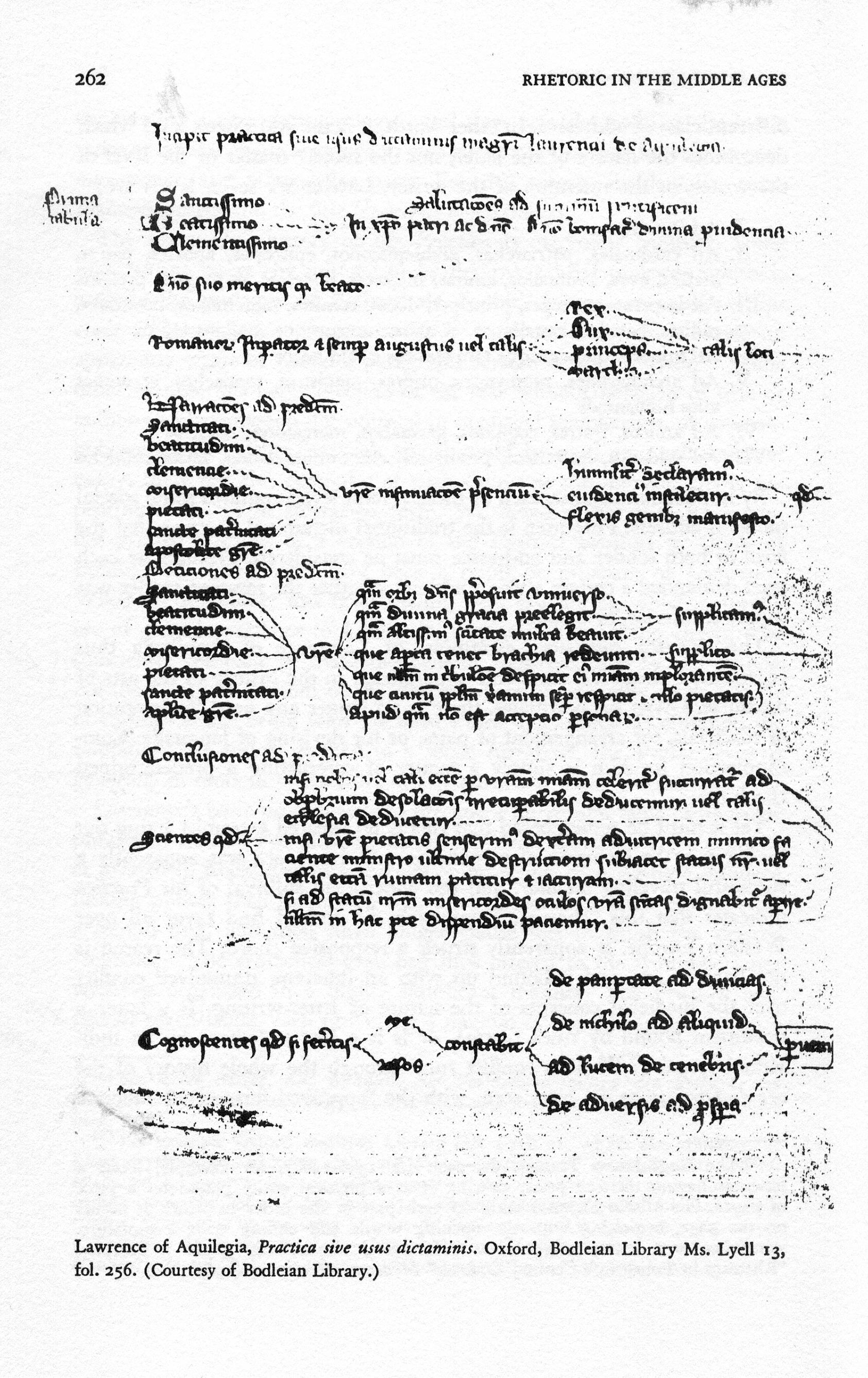
Image 1: Lawrence of Aquilegia, Practica sive usus dictaminis. Oxford, Bodleian Library Ms. Lyell 13, fol. 256 in Murphy 1974.

Image 2: Printed text taken from the Practica (Murphy 1974).

=== Tractatus super diversis modis componendi epistolam; Ars narrandi, petendi, et concludendi; Speculum dictaminis super diversis litterarum formis; Theorica dictaminis (all undated) ===
These four works represent shortened or excerpted versions of Lawrence’s previous treatises. Some scholars ascribe these works to John of Bondi, believed to be Lawrence’s pupil, but it was regular practice for dictatores to compose different versions of the same manuscript (Murphy 1974).

=== Letters ===
To model the epistolary style to students and to complement his treatises, Lawrence wrote many letters. The letters exist in two fourteenth-century collections in manuscript form.

== Influence ==
While Lawrence is known for taking the ars dictaminis to its “mechanistic dead end” (Perelman 1991) and marking its decline, his pragmatic approach marks the corresponding rise of a new movement in Italy: the ars notaria. With the ars notaria, a new class of writers appeared, working as professional secretaries and scribes. These early notaries concerned themselves with documents’ forms and legal documents.

With his formulaic approach to the ars dictaminis, Lawrence introduced a pragmatic form in his Practica that “t[ook] the chartistic view to its ultimate point” (Murphy 1974). Furthermore, the Practica marks a shift from content- to form-based writing and emphasizes a “phatic rhetoric of personal and official relations” (Perelman 1991). Unlike the classical rhetorical style concerned with persuasion, Lawrence’s works concern writing for social purposes, as is clear from his extensive treatment of the salutation in his treatises on letter writing (Jensen 1973). Medieval rhetoric scholar, James J. Murphy, stresses the phatic approach characterized by Lawrence’s writing, noting “It is the addressee’s level which determines the nature of the letter, not the subject matter or the level of the writer, or the intentions of the writer” (1974).

Lawrence’s applied approach to letter writing also stands as an early ancestor to modern texts on business communication (Perelman 1991). Just as teachers today direct their students to examples of memos and reports in textbooks, Lawrence directed his students to his model letters and tables in the Practica and related texts (Perelman 1991).
