= Quichilino da Spello =

Quichilino da Spello (fl. 1304) was the author of the Pomerium rethorice ('Orchard of Rhetoric'), a treatise on the ars dictaminis (art of letter-writing). It was written while Quichilino, a native of Spello, was a professor at the University of Padua. It was dedicated to a Venetian canon named Stephanus Nayn. It was completed in 1304 before the death of Pope Benedict XI on 7 July.

Quichilino explains the title of his work as indicating a viridarium (garden of trees) from which rhetoric is picked like fruit or apples (genera rethoricorum fructuum et pomorum). For example, the king of France may choose to call the sultan of Cairo "procurator of Satan" (procurator Sathane), but the republics of Genoa and Venice, who have commercial relations with Egypt, should call him "most excellent prince" (excellentissimus princeps) or the like. On "salutations between friends and associates", he writes:

Such a friendly manner of speaking is possible for a king to a king, soldier to soldier, judge to judge, doctor to doctor, cleric to cleric, and from anyone to someone who is his equal, and even from a superior to an inferior, if he so wishes. However, an inferior should not speak to a superior in such a friendly manner, however much they may be bound by friendship, but in a way befitting his own status.

The Pomerium is preserved in a single manuscript, now Bern, Stadtbibliothek, 220. Another manuscript that once existed, Metz, Bibliothèque municipale, 1206, is now lost.

== Sources ==
- Delle Donne, Fulvio (2016). "Quichilino da Spello". Dizionario Biografico degli Italiani (in Italian). Vol. 86: Querenghi–Rensi. Rome: Institute of the Italian Encyclopaedia. ISBN 978-88-12-00032-6.
- Dillon, John B. (2004). "Quilichino of Spoleto". In Christopher Kleinhenz (ed.). Medieval Italy: An Encyclopedia. Vol. 2. Routledge. p. 941.
- Licitra, Vincenzo, ed. (1979). Il Pomerium rethorice di Bichilino da Spello. Florence: La Nuova Italia.
- Mews, Constant J.; Chiavaroli, Neville (2014). "The Latin West". In Barbara Caine (ed.). Friendship: A History. pp. 89–126.
