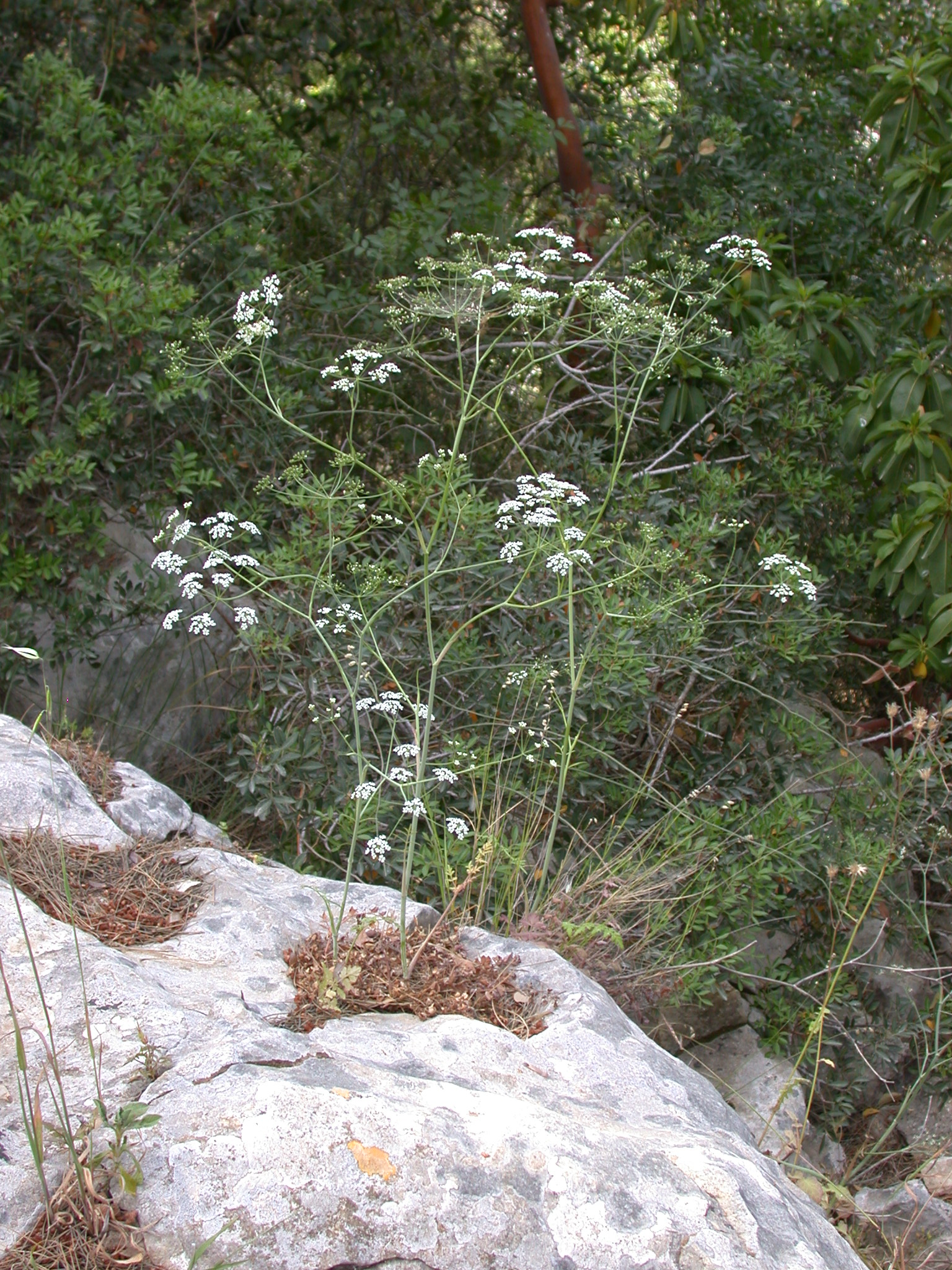
- Scaligeria napiformis

Scientific classification
- Kingdom: Plantae
- Clade: Tracheophytes
- Clade: Angiosperms
- Clade: Eudicots
- Clade: Asterids
- Order: Apiales
- Family: Apiaceae
- Subfamily: Apioideae
- Tribe: Pyramidoptereae
- Genus: Scaligeria; DC.

= Scaligeria (plant) =

Genus of flowering plant

Scaligeria is a genus of flowering plants belonging to the family Apiaceae. It is also in Tribe Pyramidoptereae.

Its native range is eastern Mediterranean (within Crete, Cyprus, East Aegean Islands, Greece and Yugoslavia) to Central Asia (within Albania, Lebanon, Libya, Israel, Syria and Turkey) and Uzbekistan.

The genus name of Scaligeria is in honour of Julius Caesar Scaliger (1484–1558), an Italian scholar and physician, who spent a major part of his career in France. It was first described and published in Coll. Mém. Vol.5 on page 70 in 1829.

== Known species ==
According to Kew:

- Scaligeria alziarii Hand, Hadjik. & Zetzsche
- Scaligeria halophila (Rech.f.) Rech.f.
- Scaligeria korshinskii (Lipsky) Korovin
- Scaligeria lazica Boiss.
- Scaligeria moreana Engstrand
- Scaligeria napiformis (Willd. ex Spreng.) Grande
