= Christophe de Longueil =

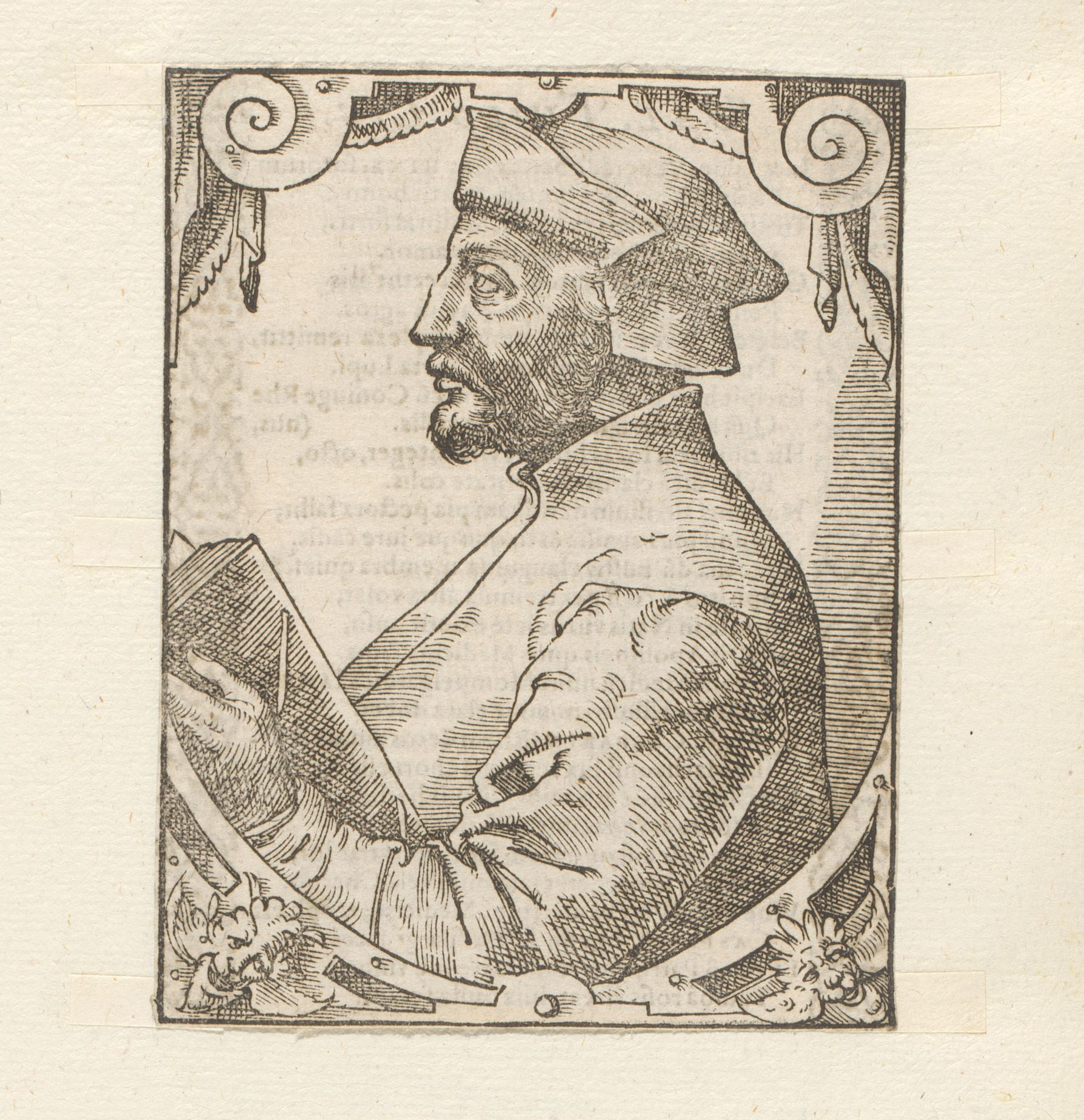
Portrait ofChristophe de Longueil by Tobias Stimmer

Christophe de Longueil (1490 – September 11, 1522) was a humanist from the Duchy of Brabant. He is also known by his Latin name, Christophorus Longolius.

He was born in Mechelen, and studied jurisprudence in Valence. He became a lawyer in 1511, and served from 1513 as an official in Paris. He also served as a tutor to a young King Francis I of France. He had given up law to study classical literature. Later he traveled around Europe, finally settling in Padua, where he died in 1522.
