= Étienne Dolet =

16th-century French scholar and printer

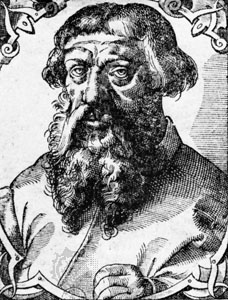
- Born: 3 August 1509; Orleans, France
- Died: 3 August 1546 (aged 37); Paris, France
- Cause of death: Public execution for heresy
- Monuments: Numerous monuments in France. Major statue in Paris melted down by German occupation during World War II.
- Education: University of Toulouse University of Padua
- Occupations: philosopher, writer, printer, translator
- Known for: outspoken views and heterodox publications

Étienne Dolet (French: [etjɛn dɔlɛ]; 3 August 1509 – 3 August 1546) was a French scholar, translator and printer. He was a controversial figure throughout his lifetime, which was buffeted by the opposing forces of the Renaissance and the French Inquisition. His early attacks upon the Inquisition and the municipal authorities of Toulouse, together with his later publications in Lyon, caused the French Inquisition to monitor his activities closely.

After several stays in prison, the combined efforts of the parlement of Paris, the Inquisition, and the theological faculty of the Sorbonne resulted in his conviction for heresy and a death sentence. He was hanged and burned with his books on the Place Maubert in Paris. In modern times, Dolet is remembered as a martyr for what is now known as freedom of speech and freedom of the press.

== Early life and education ==
Born in 1509 to parents who are not known to modern historians, Dolet lived in Orléans until the age of twelve. He was able to secure a very solid education because influential "and perhaps wealthy patronage ... made provision for his education, mainly at Padua and Toulouse, with apparently few privations due to lack of means." Accordingly, in 1521, he left for Paris, where he studied Latin for five years with Nicolas Bérault, who also taught Gaspard II de Coligny.

In 1526, following the humanist tradition of the time, he began a tour of European universities. First, he went to Padua to perfect his knowledge of Latin and especially of Cicero's writings. He did this under the direction of his master and friend, Simon de Villanova. On the death of Villanova, Étienne Dolet served as secretary to Jean de Langeac, bishop of Limoges and French ambassador to the Republic of Venice. There he followed Battista Egnazio's lessons on Cicero, who became for Dolet his “master of writing and often of thought”. He stayed in Venice for a year, leaving when Langeac's ambassadorship came to an end. During this time, Dolet also found time to write Latin love poems to a Venetian woman named Elena.

He returned soon afterwards to Toulouse, where he studied law from 1532 to 1534.

== Prison stays and banishment ==
During his stay in Toulouse, he was elected speaker of the 'French Nation' and was recognised as a gifted orator. In October 1533, he delivered a violent indictment of the "backwardness and hostility to humanism and classical scholarship" of the city of Toulouse, going so far as to describe it as barbarian. Later, in January 1534, he delivered a diatribe on religious superstitions and the brutality of the Gascons. He was imprisoned in March 1534 and, despite the protection of Jean de Pins (a prominent humanist and bishop), he was banished by the Parliament of Toulouse in 1534.

In August 1533, following the banishment, Dolet moved to Lyon, where he joined the circle of Lyon humanists and began the most fruitful part of his career. Its members included Clément Marot and Rabelais, as well as Guillaume and Maurice Scève, Jean de Tourne père and the printer Sébastien Gryphe, for whom he became a proofreader. In addition to these friends and close associates, Dolet also acquired in Lyon a number of sworn enemies who would "follow him all the way to the pyre."

Dolet's involvement in printing and publishing took place during a dynamic period in the development of European thought and technology. King Francis I actively promoted the use of vernacular French (as opposed to Latin) in the arts and publishing, and supported Dolet, Clément Marot and Rabelais, among others, who shared his point of view. At the same time, the invention and diffusion of printing technology was revolutionizing the transmission of social, political and religious ideas across Europe. In addition, the Protestant movement and the Anglican schism created an environment in which the Catholic Church felt threatened.

In 1535, thanks to Sébastien Gryphe, Dolet published several of his own writings, including his tract, the Dialogus de imitatione Ciceroniana. The Ciceroniana revived the quarrel over Ciceronianism, which refers to the tendency among Renaissance humanists to imitate the language and style of Cicero. In this work, Dolet attacks both Erasmus and Luther, accusing them both of attempting to destroy the Christian religion.

During a brawl that took place in December 1536, Dolet killed a painter, Henri Guillot, nicknamed Compaing. Dolet claimed that Guillot wanted to assassinate him. He fled to Paris to beg for mercy from Francis I, to whom he presented a self-effacing poem describing the brawl. The King accorded him his protection and ordered him to return to Lyon. Dolet was nevertheless imprisoned for two months upon his return to Lyon.

== Royal privilege and printer in Lyon ==
On March 6, 1537, Francis I granted Dolet a highly advantageous privilege that gave him the exclusive right for ten years to print any work in Latin, Greek, Italian or French, whether from his pen or under his supervision. He allowed various publishers to benefit from this privilege before setting himself up as a printer in 1539.

In 1538, he published the second of his two volumes of the Commentariorum linguae Latinae, an ambitious etymological dictionary of Latin (the first was published in 1536). This work, which he first conceived of when he was sixteen years old, is considered to be the magnum opus of his life.

Also in 1538, Dolet married and, the following year, he had a son.

In 1541, he published De officio legati on the functions of ambassadors. This work is thought to be earliest printed work on the subject of ambassadorial responsibilities, with Dolet drawing on his experience working as part of Langeac's embassy in Venice. However, it regarded mainly as an historical marker and is not considered to be influential in advancing thought on the law of international diplomacy.

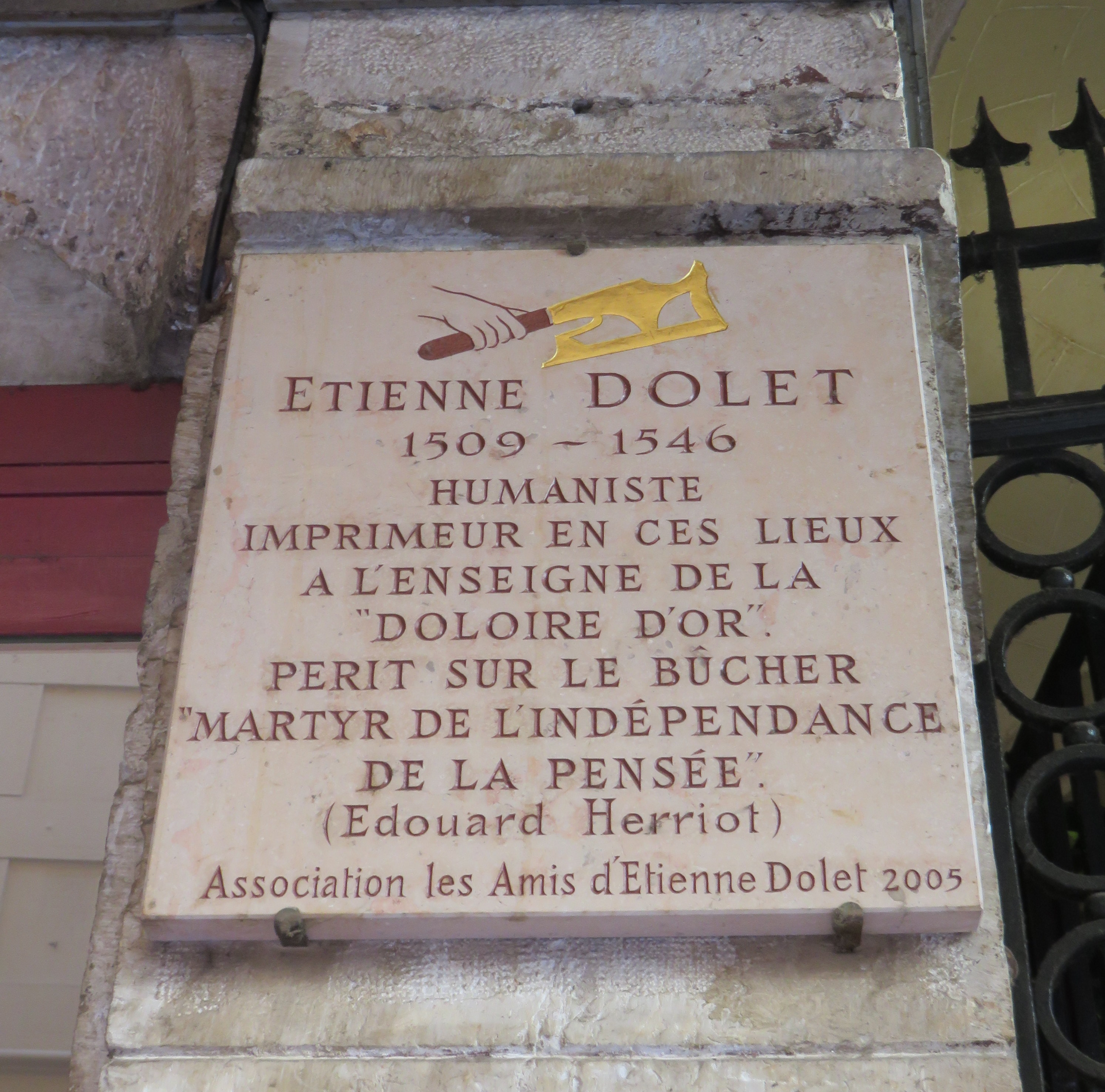
Commemorative plaque for Étienne Dolet, located at the passage des Imprimeurs in Lyon.

With the financial assistance of Hellouin Dulin, Dolet opened a print shop on the rue Mercière in Lyon. Over the period 1538 to 1544, Dolet published some 84 works including textbooks for students, classic texts in French or Latin, and the literature of the time, Clément Marot, Rabelais (indeed, Dolet published a counterfeit edition of Gargantua which led to the falling out of the two men ).

One of his popular publishing successes was his work on 'How to Translate Well.' In this publication and more generally, Dolet promoted the use of vernacular French. This was part of a growing movement to make books more available to the educated, general public.

A quarter of this production is devoted to religious works. Notably, he published a vernacular French version of the New Testament and 'The Institution of the Christian Religion' by John Calvin, a Protestant tract published during the Inquisition. He was not unaware of the dangers to which this sort of publication exposed him. Even works that he viewed as being within Catholic orthodoxy caused trouble with the Catholic authorities. His Cato Christianus is a catechism based on the model of the Disticha Catonis (Cato's Couplets), a popular textbook for teaching Latin in the 16th century. The Cato Christianus was not only banned as soon as it was released, it was also condemned on October 2, 1542 and burned on the square in front of Notre-Dame de Paris in February 1544.

== Inquisition and trial ==
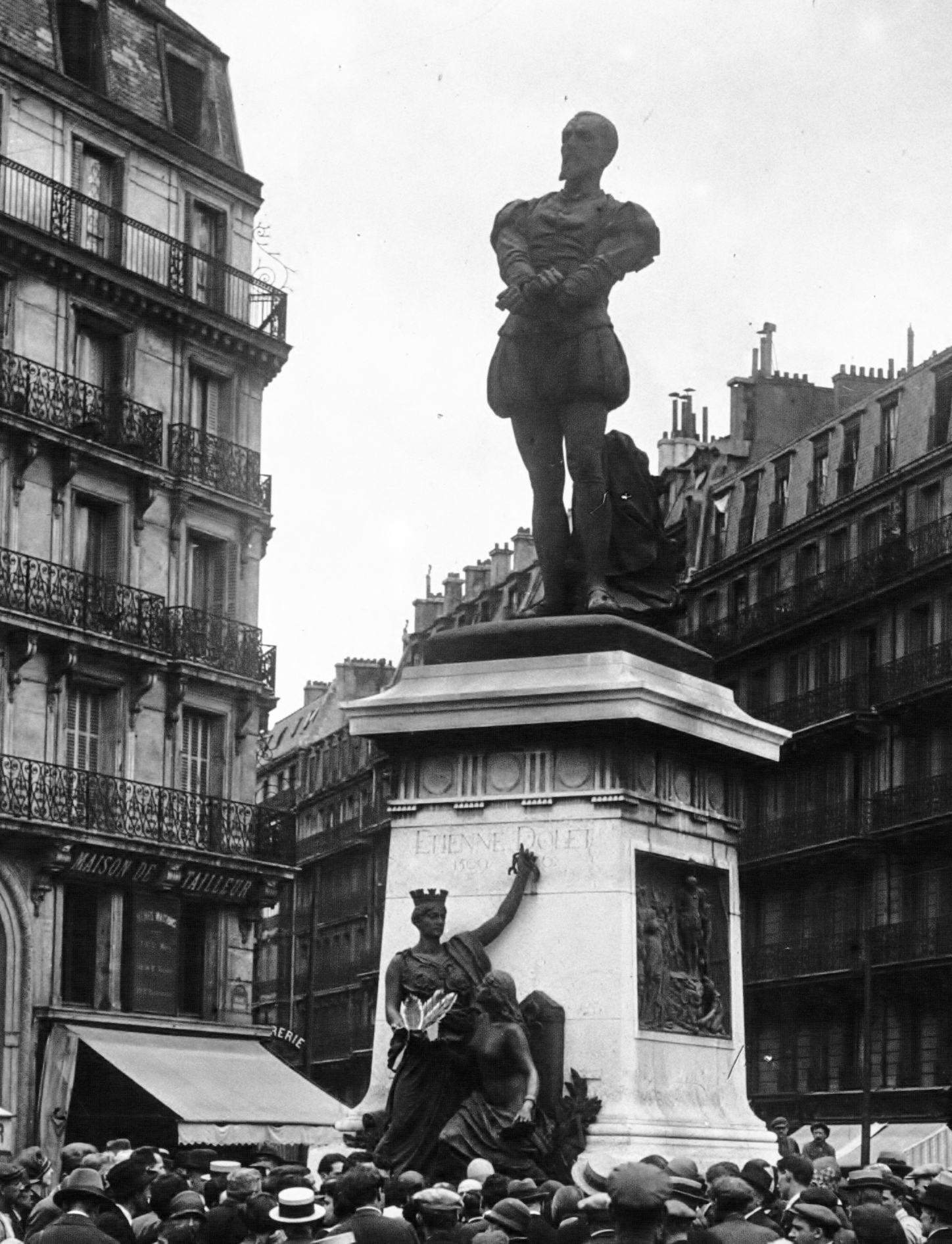
Bronze statue of Etienne Dolet by Ernest Guilbert, Place Maubert, Paris. A political demonstration is visible in the photo at the base of the statue, which was a favorite location for protests by Parisian militants in the late 19th and early 20th centuries. Inaugurated in 1889, the statue was melted down for metal in support of the war effort by the Nazis in 1942.

Dolet's publication of religious works attracted the attention of the inquisitor Matthieu Ory in 1542. In August of that year, he was incarcerated in the prison of Lyon, accused of being the author of pernicious works and of not believing in the immortality of the soul. Convicted of having printed certain of these pernicious works, eating meat during Lent and claiming to prefer the sermon to the mass, he appealed to the Parliament of Paris, which had him transferred from the prisons of Roanne to the Conciergerie where he remained for 15 months. He obtained a new pardon thanks to the intervention of the Bishop of Tulle, Pierre Duchâtel and returned to Lyon.

He was imprisoned a second time in 1544, after the discovery of bundles of heretical books bearing his printer's mark. However, he managed to escape and took refuge in Piedmont, Italy. He imprudently returned to France because he thought he could print letters in Lyon to appeal to the justice of the King of France, the Queen of Navarre and the Parliament of Paris. It was in these circumstances that he published the 'Second Hell,' a collection of letters addressed to the powerful and intended to be a defense against his accusers. These letters were followed by two translations of Plato, the Axiochus and a translation of the Hipparchus (also apocryphal), subtitled “on lust and affection to gain”.

His third trial examined the affair of the bundles of heretical books. This trial may have been the result of a plot almost certainly organised by competing master printers from Lyon. The inquisitors focused on a passage of his translation of the Axochius: “After death, you will be nothing at all”. Dolet embellished his translation by adding the words “du tout” (at all). The theology faculty of the Sorbonne saw this as proof of Dolet's heresy: he does not believe in the immortality of the soul.

On August 2, 1546, Parlement pronounced a death sentence for Dolet, citing "blasphemy, sedition and 'exposition' of banned and damnable books" and condemned him to be hanged and then burned with his books until his body was "converted into ashes".

== Execution ==
This sentence was carried out in great haste, possibly out of fear that François I would again intervene on Dolet’s behalf. On August 3, 1546, the day after the sentence was rendered, Dolet made 'amends' prior to being transferred to his place of execution. In accordance with an act of mercy in his judgment, he was offered the possibility of being hanged (which resulted in death through strangulation, given the technology of the time) before being thrown with his books onto his pyre on Place Maubert in Paris. This Place was reserved for the printers' pyres during the Inquisition: in the same year, four other printers were hanged there and then burned.

On his way to his execution, he was said to have composed the punning pentameter Non dolet ipse Dolet, sed pia turba dolet (Dolet himself does not suffer, but the pious crowd grieves). This reportedly elicited the following response from the priest who accompanied him: Non pia turba dolet sed Dolet ipse dolet (“it will be Dolet who will suffer and no one else”).

== Religious views ==
Whether Dolet is to be classed with a representative of Protestantism or as an advocate of anti-Christian rationalism is a subject of debate. Protestants of his own time did not recognize him as one of them. Calvin condemned him, along with Heinrich Cornelius Agrippa and his master Villanova, as having uttered blasphemies. The religious character of a large number of the books which he translated or published is sometimes cited in opposition to these charges, as is his advocacy of reading the Scriptures in the vernacular tongue.

Dolet has been referred to as an Anti-Trinitarian.

== Legacy ==
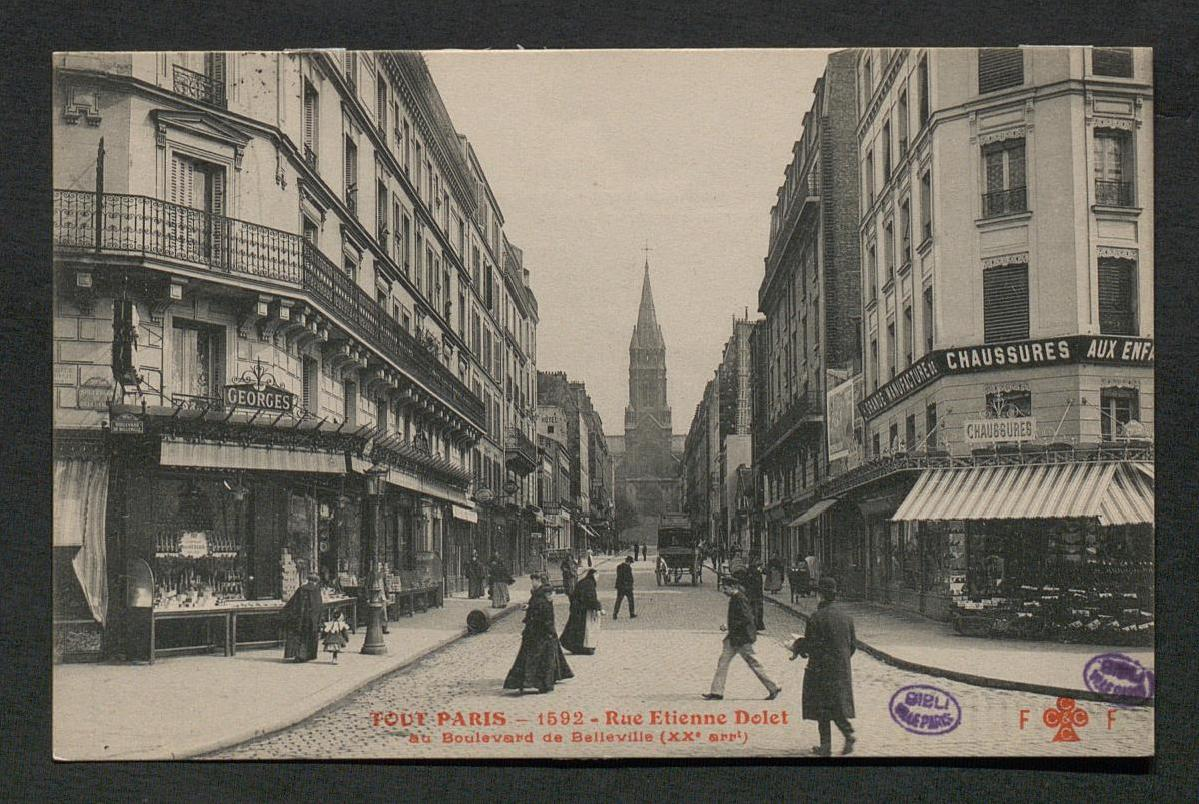
Post card photo of the rue Étienne Dolet in the 20th arrondissement of Paris.

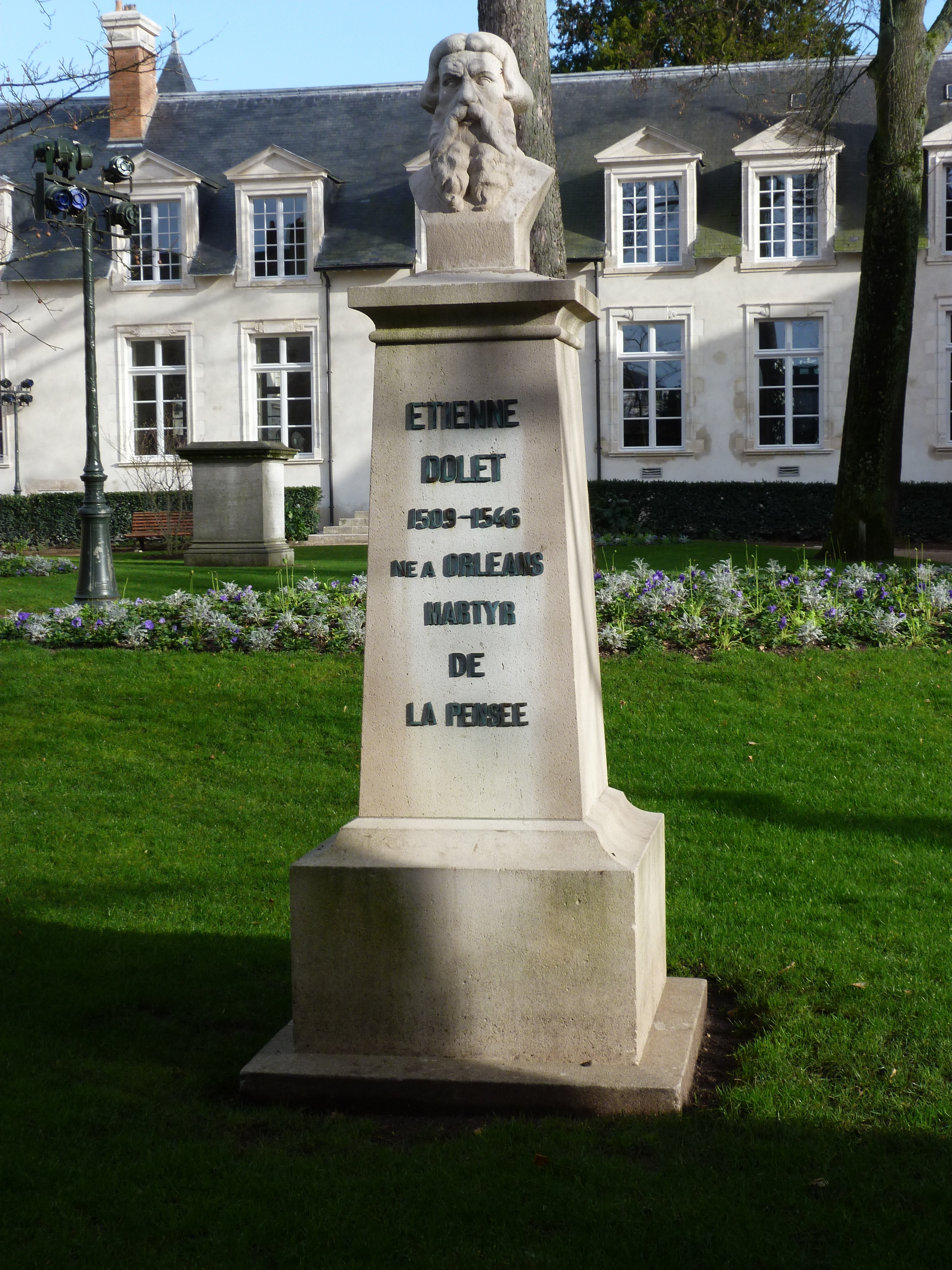
A bust of Étienne Dolet in Orléans, (Val-de-Loire, France)

From the eighteenth century onwards, Dolet has been remembered as a martyr to intolerance and as a symbol of free speech and freedom of the press. He has been commemorated by many monuments in France and has served as a rallying points for numerous political demonstrations.

A first biography of Dolet’s life was published in 1779. An account of the Dolet’s trial for heresy was published (1836) by A.H. Taillandier from the registers of the parlement of Paris.

A bronze statue of Dolet was erected in 1889 on the site of his execution on the Place Maubert in Paris. During the religious conflicts of the Third Republic, the statue became "not only the virtual emblem of anticlerical freethinkers, but also served as a rallying point for Parisian militants, who paraded before his monument every year." The statue was removed and melted down in 1942 during the German occupation of Paris. Several attempts have been made to replace this monument, but so far none have been successful.

A street in the 20th arrondissement of Paris is named after Étienne Dolet.

== Principal works ==
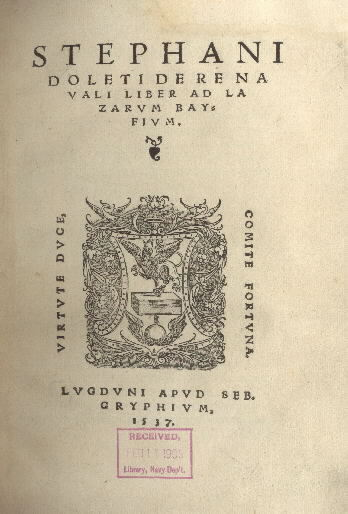
De Re navali, Lyon, 1537.

Many of Dolet's books were destroyed as the products of heresy and books bearing his imprint are now extremely rare. His principal works are:

- Orationes duæ in Tholosam. Eiusdem epistolarum libri II. Eiusdem carminum libri II. Ad eundem Epistolarum amicorum liber (1534)
- Dialogus de Imitatione Ciceroniana adversus Desiderium Erasmus Roterdamum pro Christophoro Longolio(1535), where he argues with Erasmus.
- Commentarius Linguæ latinæ, Book I (1536) ; Book II (1538), Lyon, 2 volumes in-folio.
- De Re navali liber ad Lazarum Bayfium (1537)
- Carminum libri quatuor. Collection of 195 selected works. Banned in Lyon for its use of the term, fatum, in its full philosophical sense (1538).
- Cato Christianus Stephano Doleto Gallo Aurelio autore, Lyon, Étienne Dolet, 1538.
- Cato Formulae latinarum locutionum (1539)
- La Manière de bien traduire d’une langue en l’autre (How to Translate Well from One Language to Another); (1540)
- Les Gestes de Françoys de Valoys, roi de France, Lyon, E. Dolet, 1540.
- De officio Legati, quem uulgo Ambassiatorem uocant (On the Office of Legate, Commonly Called Ambassador), 1541.
- Le Second Enfer d'Estienne Dolet natif d'Orléans (The Second Hell), Troyes, 1544. The 'Hell' in the title refers to the title of a book by Clément Marot dealing with his imprisonment for heresy in the prison of Châtelet in 1525; Dolet printed this book in 1542. 'Second' could mean either that it is the second book dealing with this subject (after that of Marot) or it could refer to Dolet's second imprisonment.
- Cantique d’Estienne Dolet (1546), on his sorrow and consolation.
