= Gaius Julius Victor =

Roman writer of rhetoric

Gaius Julius Victor (4th century AD) was a Roman writer of rhetoric, possibly of Gaulish origin. His extant manual is of some importance as facilitating the textual criticism of Quintilian, whom he closely follows in many places.
