= Ars dictaminis =

Art of dictation

Ars dictaminis (or ars dictandi) is the art of letter-writing, which often intersects with the art of rhetoric.

== History of letter-writing ==
=== Greco-Roman theory ===
Early examples of letter-writing theory can be found in C. Julius Victor's Ars rhetorica and Cassiodorus Senator's Variae epistolae. Other examples can be found in the Pseudo-Demetrius' Typoi epistolikoi, Pseudo-Libanius' Epistolimaioi kharacteres, Demetrius' Peri hermeneias, Philostratus of Lemnos' treatise, and Gregory of Nazianus' Epistle 51.

=== Latin Middle Ages ===
During the Latin medieval period, the standing assumption was that these writings would be composed in Latin, and according to well worked-out models. This made the arts of composition a subfield of rhetoric.

Medieval letter writing developed for ecclesiastical, government, and business purposes.

Important figures in the early development of Latin letter writing and document composition include Alberic of Monte Cassino (Dictaminum radii, Breviarium), his critic Adalbert of Samaria (Praecepta dictaminum, c. 1120), Hugh of Bologna (Rationes dictandi prosaice, c.1120), Bernard of Bologna's Introductiones prosaici dictaminis (1145) and Baldwin (Liber de dictaminibus, c.1150). Early anonymous works include Aurea gemma (c.1119), Rationes dictandi (1135), Precepta prosaici dictaminis secundum Tullium (c. 1140) and Ad plenam scientiam dictaminum (c.1140). Guido Faba (Summa dictaminis, c.1228), Lawrence of Aquilegia (Practica sive usus dictaminis, c.1300) and Quichilino da Spello (Pomerium rethorice, 1304) are later representatives of the genre.

Letter conventions include some form of address (e.g., “Worshipful master”); salutation (“I greet you well”); notification (“May it please you to know”); exposition (“the wool was shipped”); disposition (“and I want my money”); and valediction (“May God keep you well, at least until my bill is paid”). Clerks and scribes wrote the letters based on those rules.

=== Early Modern Europe ===
Renaissance letter writing, inspired by the rediscovery of Cicero's letters, broaden the scope of letter writing instruction.

== See also ==
- Formulary (model documents)
- Victorian letter writing guides
- De conscribendis epistolis
