= 1545 in poetry =

List of years in poetry	(table)
- … 1535; 1536; 1537; 1538; 1539; 1540; 1541; 1542; 1543; 1544; 1545; 1546; 1547; 1548; 1549; 1550; 1551; 1552; 1553; 1554; 1555 …
- In literature 1542 1543 1544 1545 1546 1547 1548
- Art; Archaeology; Architecture; Literature; Music; Philosophy; Science; +...

Nationality words link to articles with information on the nation's poetry or literature (for instance, Irish or France).

== Events ==
- French poet Louise Labé hosts a literary salon in Lyon, participants include Jean de Vauzelles, William and Maurice Scève, Pernette du Guillet, Lyonnais writers and intellectuals including Claude de Taillemont, Guillaume Aubert, Antoine du Moulin, Antoine Fumée; three future members of La Pléiade: Jacques Peletier, Jean-Antoine de Baïf and Pontus de Tyard; humanists and artists including Olivier de Magny, Pierre Woériot, Luigi Francesco Alamanni; as well as lawyers, rich Italians, scientists, scholars, and at least one priest.
- Joachim du Bellay, while he was studying law in Poitiers, writes his first verses, in imitation of Clément Marot.

== Works published ==
=== France ===
- Lancelot de Carle, Épistre Contenant le Procès Criminel Faict à l'Encontre de la Royne Anne Boullant d'Angleterre (A Letter Containing the Criminal Charges Laid Against Queen Anne Boleyn of England), written 1536
- Jehan des Gouttes, translation from the Italian of Ludovico Ariosto's Orlando Furioso
- Pernette du Guillet, Rymes de Gentille et Vertueuse Dame, published posthumously after her death this year
- Antoine Héroët, Le mespris de la court, including "L'androgyne de Platon", "La parfaicte amye", "L'accroissement d'amour", "Complaincte d'une dame", second edition in 1568, France

=== Great Britain ===
- Robert Burrant, Preceptes of Cato with Annotacions of D. Erasmus, main text in verse, with Burrant's prose translation of Desiderius Erasmus's commentary, along with Burrant's own commentary
- John Skelton:
  - Certain Books, including "Speke Parrot", "The Death of Kyng Edward the Fourth", "A Treatise of the Scottes" and "Tunnyng of Elynour Rummyng" (see also 1521)
  - Phillip Sparrow, publication year uncertain
  - Why Come Ye Not to Court?, publication year uncertain

=== Other languages ===
- Ludovico Ariosto, Cinque Canti ("Five Cantos"), first publication, a substantial fragment (about 4,400 lines) which appeared as an appendix to an edition of Orlando Furioso; Venice: published by casa di figliuoli di Aldo (the heirs of Aldus Manutius); most critics believe the fragment was intended as an addition to Orlando Furioso, but many others think the work was meant to be independent

== Births ==
Death years link to the corresponding "[year] in poetry" article:

- December 6 – Janus Dousa (died 1604), Dutch statesman, historian, poet and philologist
- Also:
  - George Bannatyne (died 1608), collector of Scottish poems
  - Nicholas Breton (also spelled "Nicholas Britton" and "Nicholas Brittaine") born about this year (died 1626), English poet and novelist
  - Robin Clidro (born 1580), Welsh language poet and itinerant poet
  - Gabriel Harvey, poet and author (died 1631)
  - Sebastian Fabian Klonowic born about this year (died 1602), Polish
  - Alexander Montgomerie (died 1598), Scottish
  - Jakob Regnart born sometime from 1540 to this year (died 1599), German
  - 1545/1546: Ulpian Fulwell (died 1584/1585/1586), English Renaissance theatre playwright, satirist and poet

== Deaths ==
Birth years link to the corresponding "[year] in poetry" article:

- July 7 – Pernette du Guillet (born 1520), French, see "Works published", above
- Agnolo Firenzuola died about this year (born 1493), Italian

== See also ==
- Poetry
- 16th century in poetry
- 16th century in literature
- French Renaissance literature
- Renaissance literature
- Spanish Renaissance literature
