= 1543 in poetry =

List of years in poetry	(table)
- … 1533; 1534; 1535; 1536; 1537; 1538; 1539; 1540; 1541; 1542; 1543; 1544; 1545; 1546; 1547; 1548; 1549; 1550; 1551; 1552; 1553 …
- In literature 1540 1541 1542 1543 1544 1545 1546
- Art; Archaeology; Architecture; Literature; Music; Philosophy; Science; +...

Nationality words link to articles with information on the nation's poetry or literature (for instance, Irish or France).

== Events ==
- Pope Paul III issues the Index Librorum Prohibitorum, a list of books forbidden to Catholics (the first official index is started in 1564).
- Pierre de Ronsard is tonsured in Le Mans, where he met Jacques Peletier.

== Works published ==
- Juan Boscan and Garcilaso de la Vega, Las obras de Boscan y alqunas de Garcilaso de la Vega, published posthumously, Spain
- John Hardyng, Chronicle, contains a version of the quest for the Holy Grail; a minor source for Thomas Malory's Le Morte d'Arthur of 1485; published posthumously, England
- Clément Marot, Théodore de Bèze and Pierre Certon La Forme des Prieres et Chantz ecclesiastiques, an edition of the Geneva Psalter; Marot moved to Geneva, Switzerland this year and was commissioned by John Calvin to create rhymed versions of all the Psalms; Marot being unable to complete the work (he died in the fall of 1544), the effort was continued by Bèze; Switzerland, French-language

== Births ==
Death years link to the corresponding "[year] in poetry" article:

- October – Sir Edward Dyer (died 1607), English courtier and poet
- October 23 – Juan de la Cueva (died c. 1610), Spanish poet and playwright
- Also:
  - Louis Bellaud (died 1588), French
  - Sherefxan Bidlisi (died 1599), Iranian Kurdish historian, writer and poet
  - Juan de la Cueva (died 1612), Spanish dramatist and poet
  - Thomas Deloney (died 1600), English novelist and balladist
  - Simon Goulart (died 1628) Swiss, French-language clergyman, writer and poet
  - Sebastian Grabowiecki born about this year (died 1607), Polish
  - Bartosz Paprocki (died 1614), Polish and Czech writer, historiographer, translator, and poet
  - Siôn Phylip (died 1620), Welsh language poet
  - Gosvāmī Tulsīdās, also spelled "Tulasī Dāsa" or "Tulsidas"; another source gives his birth year as 1532 (died 1623), Indian Hindu religious poet
  - Antonio Veneziano (died 1593), Italian poet who wrote in the Sicilian language

== Deaths ==
Birth years link to the corresponding "[year] in poetry" article:

- date not known – Sebastian Franck, who called himself "Franck von Word" died this year or in 1542 (born 1499), German freethinker, humanist, radical reformer and poet
- Marcello Palingenio Stellato, (born 1500), Italian, Latin-language poet

== See also ==
- Poetry
- 16th century in poetry
- 16th century in literature
- French Renaissance literature
- Renaissance literature
- Spanish Renaissance literature
