= 1533 in poetry =

List of years in poetry	(table)
- … 1523; 1524; 1525; 1526; 1527; 1528; 1529; 1530; 1531; 1532; 1533; 1534; 1535; 1536; 1537; 1538; 1539; 1540; 1541; 1542; 1543 …
- In literature 1530 1531 1532 1533 1534 1535 1536
- Art; Archaeology; Architecture; Literature; Music; Philosophy; Science; +...

Nationality words link to articles with information on the nation's poetry or literature (for instance, Irish or France).

== Events ==
- French poet Maurice Sceve announces that he has found the tomb of "Laura", the woman who is the subject of so many poems by Petrarch, at the church of Santa Croce in Avignon, further strengthening French interest in the Italian poet.

== Works published ==
- Luigi Alamanni, Opere Toscane ("Tuscan Works"), Latin elegies, published either this year or in 1532, Italian writer published in Lyon, France, said to consist of satirical pieces written in blank verse
- Teofilo Folengo, L'Umanità del Figliuolo di Die, a life of Christ in rhymed octaves, Italy
- Clément Marot, Suite de l'Adolescence clementine, France
- Dwija Sridhara, Vidya-Sundara, Bengali narrative poem, commissioned by Prince Firuz of Bengal
- François Villon, modernized edition of his poetry, published by Clément Marot

== Births ==
Death years link to the corresponding "[year] in poetry" article:

- January 2 – Johann Major (died 1600), German poet and theologian
- August 7 – Alonso de Ercilla (died 1594), Spanish soldier and poet
- Eknath (died 1599), Marathi language religious poet in the Hindu tradition of India
- Elazar ben Moshe Azikri (died 1600), Jewish kabbalist, poet and writer
- Andrea Rapicio (died 1573), Italian, Latin-language poet
- Approximate date – Sun Kehong (died 1611), Chinese landscape painter, calligrapher and poet

== Deaths ==
Birth years link to the corresponding "[year] in poetry" article:

- July 6 – Ludovico Ariosto (born 1474), Italian poet who also wrote verses in Latin
- Giovanni Francesco Pico della Mirandola (born 1469), Italian philosopher and Latin-language poet

== See also ==
- Poetry
- 16th century in poetry
- 16th century in literature
- French Renaissance literature
- Renaissance literature
- Spanish Renaissance literature
