= 1542 in poetry =

List of years in poetry	(table)
- … 1532; 1533; 1534; 1535; 1536; 1537; 1538; 1539; 1540; 1541; 1542; 1543; 1544; 1545; 1546; 1547; 1548; 1549; 1550; 1551; 1552 …
- In literature 1539 1540 1541 1542 1543 1544 1545
- Art; Archaeology; Architecture; Literature; Music; Philosophy; Science; +...

Nationality words link to articles with information on the nation's poetry or literature (for instance, Irish or France).

== Events ==
- French poet Louise Labe disguised herself as a knight and fought at the siege of Perpignan

== Works published ==
=== Great Britain ===
- Robert Burdet (poet), A Dyalogue Defensyve for Women against Malycyous Detractours, a reply to The Schole House of Women, published anonymously in 1541 (other replies include Edward Gosynhyll's [see below], and Edward More, The Defence of Women 1560)
- Edward Gosynhyll, The Prayse of all Women, publication year uncertain; a reply to The Schole House of Women, published anonymously in 1541 (see also Robert Burdet, above, and Edward More, The Defence of Women 1560); Great Britain
- John Leland, Naeniae in mortem Thomai Viati, neo-Latin poems on the death of Sir Thomas Wyatt the Elder, Great Britain

=== Other ===
- John Calvin, versifier, with Guillaume Franc's music, Geneva Psalter, a new revised edition, first published 1539 and several subsequent revisions in later years; Franc, cantor and music teacher in Geneva, Switzerland, contributed numerous tunes for this edition including Psalm 6, 8, 19, 22, 24 (also used for 62, 95 and 111), and 38 (see also, The Geneva Psalter 1539, 1543; 1560, an edition with changed melodies was published in 1551), Swiss, French-language work published in Geneva
- Antoine Héroët, La parfaicte amye, avec plusieurs aultres compositions dudict autheur, Lyon: Etienne Dolet, France

== Births ==
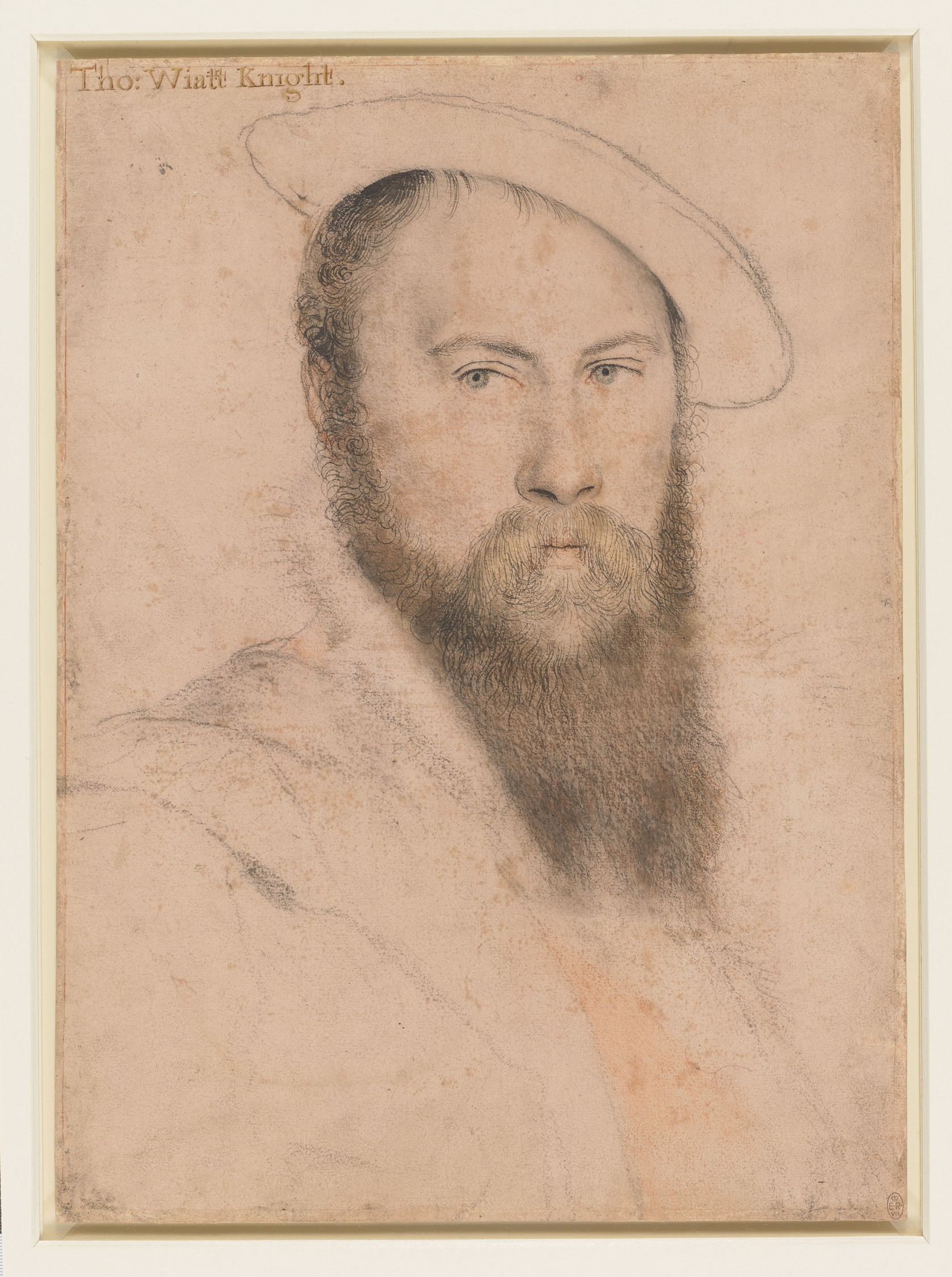
Thomas Wyatt the Elder died this year (Portrait of Sir Thomas Wyatt, by Hans Holbein the Younger, c. 1535–37)

Death years link to the corresponding "[year] in poetry" article:

- June 24 – St. John of the Cross, in Spanish: "San Juan de la Cruz", born "Juan de Yepes Alvarez", (died 1591), Spanish mystic, poet, writer, Carmelite friar and priest, who was a major figure of the Catholic Reformation
- December – Catherine Des Roches. also known as "Catherine Fradonnet", (died 1587) French writer and poet; daughter of Madeleine Des Roches, the two hosted a literary circle which included Scévole de Sainte-Marthe, Barnabé Brisson, René Chopin, Antoine Loisel, Claude Binet, Nicolas Rapin and Odet de Turnèbe
- date not known – Thomas Newton (poet) born about this year (died 1607), English physician, poet and translator

== Deaths ==
Birth years link to the corresponding "[year] in poetry" article:

- September 21 – Juan Boscan, original Catalan name: "Joan Boscà Almogàver" (born c. 1490), Catalan poet who wrote in Spanish
- October 11 – Sir Thomas Wyatt the Elder (born c. 1503), English (see John Leland's work in "Works published" section)
- date not known – Sebastian Franck, who called himself "Franck von Word" died this year or in 1543 (born 1499), German freethinker, humanist, radical reformer and poet
- date not known – Malik Muhammad Jayasi (born 1477), Indian poet who wrote in the Avadhi dialect of Hindi

== See also ==
- Poetry
- 16th century in poetry
- 16th century in literature
- French Renaissance literature
- Renaissance literature
- Spanish Renaissance literature
