= 1537 in poetry =

List of years in poetry	(table)
- … 1527; 1528; 1529; 1530; 1531; 1532; 1533; 1534; 1535; 1536; 1537; 1538; 1539; 1540; 1541; 1542; 1543; 1544; 1545; 1546; 1547 …
- In literature 1534 1535 1536 1537 1538 1539 1540
- Art; Archaeology; Architecture; Literature; Music; Philosophy; Science; +...

Nationality words link to articles with information on the nation's poetry or literature (for instance, Irish or France).

== Events ==
- Clément Marot returns to Paris early this year. Also this year, he bests François de Sagon in a literary quarrel involving an exchange of satires and epigrams.

== Works published ==
- Anonymous, Boccus and Sydrake, publication year uncertain but sometime from 1530 to this year, edited by John Twyne, an encyclopedia in dialogue form, derived from the Old French Sidrac, in which Boccus asks 847 questions and Sidrac answers them (see Sidrak and Bokkus).

== Births ==
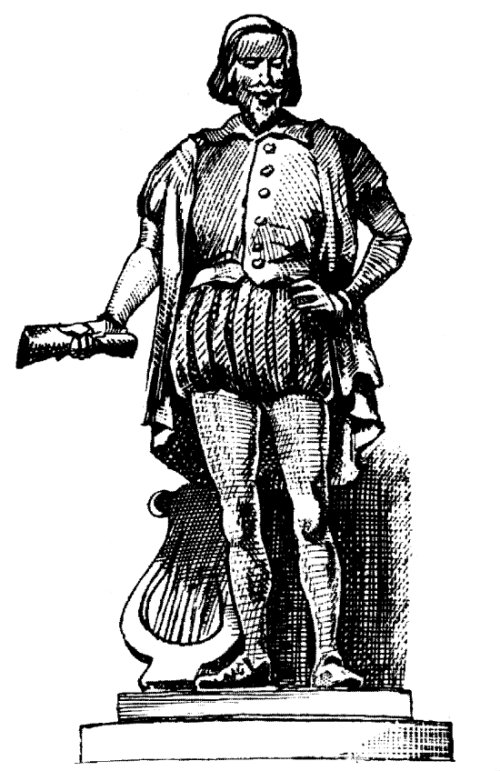
Portuguese poet and playwright Gil Vicente

Death years link to the corresponding "[year] in poetry" article:

- Patrick Adamson (died 1592), Scottish divine, archbishop of St Andrews, diplomat and Latin-language poet
- Francisco de Aldana (died 1578), Spanish
- Thomas Preston (died 1598), a master of Trinity Hall, Cambridge, an English poet and perhaps a playwright

== Deaths ==
Birth years link to the corresponding "[year] in poetry" article:

- Andrzej Krzycki (born 1482), archbishop, Latin prose writer and Polish-language poet often considered one of that nation's greatest humanist writers
- Thomas Murner died about this year (born 1475), German satirist, poet and translator
- Antonio Tebaldeo (born 1463), Italian poet who wrote in both Italian and Latin
- Gil Vicente (born c. 1465), prominent Portuguese playwright and poet who also wrote in Spanish

== See also ==
- Poetry
- 16th century in poetry
- 16th century in literature
- French Renaissance literature
- Renaissance literature
- Spanish Renaissance literature
