= 1546 in poetry =

List of years in poetry	(table)
- … 1536; 1537; 1538; 1539; 1540; 1541; 1542; 1543; 1544; 1545; 1546; 1547; 1548; 1549; 1550; 1551; 1552; 1553; 1554; 1555; 1556 …
- In literature 1543 1544 1545 1546 1547 1548 1549
- Art; Archaeology; Architecture; Literature; Music; Philosophy; Science; +...

Nationality words link to articles with information on the nation's poetry or literature (for instance, Irish or France).

== Events ==
- After meeting with Jacques Peletier du Mans, Joachim du Bellay decides to go to Paris, where he meets Pierre de Ronsard and Jean-Antoine de Baïf, who were studying Greek and Latin under Jean Daurat, also a poet.

== Works published ==
- Luigi Alamanni, La Coltivazione, didactic poem written in imitation of Virgil's Georgics, Italian writer published in Paris, France
- Ludovico Ariosto, Le Rime di M. Ludovico Ariosto, edited by Iacopo Coppa Modanese; Italy
- John Heywood, A Dialogue Conteinyng the Nomber in Effect of all the Proverbes in the Englishe Tongue; Great Britain

== Births ==
Death years link to the corresponding "[year] in poetry" article:

- Philippe Desportes (died 1606), French poet
- Veronica Franco (died 1591), Italian poet and courtesan

== Deaths ==
Birth years link to the corresponding "[year] in poetry" article:

- February 18 – Martin Luther died (born 1483), German theologian and poet
- July 16 – Anne Askew, also spelled "Anne Ayscough" (born 1521) English poet and Protestant who was persecuted as a heretic; the only woman on record to have been tortured in the Tower of London, before being burnt at the stake
- August 3 – Étienne Dolet (born 1509), French writer, poet and humanist
- Also:
  - Pietro Bonomo, also known as "Petrus" (born 1458), Italian, humanist, diplomat, bishop of Trieste and Latin-language poet
  - Nikolaus Decius died sometime after this year (born 1485), German

== See also ==
- Poetry
- 16th century in poetry
- 16th century in literature
- French Renaissance literature
- Renaissance literature
- Spanish Renaissance literature
