= 1591 in poetry =

List of years in poetry	(table)
- … 1581; 1582; 1583; 1584; 1585; 1586; 1587; 1588; 1589; 1590; 1591; 1592; 1593; 1594; 1595; 1596; 1597; 1598; 1599; 1600; 1601 …
- In literature 1588 1589 1590 1591 1592 1593 1594
- Art; Archaeology; Architecture; Literature; Music; Philosophy; Science; +...

Nationality words link to articles with information on the nation's poetry or literature (for instance, Irish or France).

== Events ==
- February 25 – English Queen Elizabeth I awards Edmund Spenser a pension of 50 pounds per year for life (see Spenser's Complaints, in "Works" section below)

== Works published ==
=== Great Britain ===
Title page of Philip Sidney's Astrophel and Stella

- Nicholas Breton, Brittons Bowre of Delights
- Thomas Campion, Astrophel and Stella
- Michael Drayton, The Harmonie of the Church (republished 1610 under the title A Heavenly Harmonie)
- Abraham Fraunce:
  - The Countesse of Pembrokes Emanuel
  - The Countesse of Pembrokes Yvychurch, Part 1 adapted from Torquato Tasso's Aminta; Part 2 a revision of Fraunce's translation of Amyntas 1587 by Thomas Watson; volume also includes translations of the second Bucolic of Virgil (first published in Fraunce's The Lawiers Logike) and of the opening of Heliodorus's Aethiopica (see also The Third Part 1592)
- Sir John Harington, Orlando Furioso in English Heroical Verse, translated from the Italian of Ludovico Ariosto
- James VI of Scotland, Lepanto
- George Peele, Decensus Astraeae, a pageant for the lord mayor of London
- Sir Philip Sidney, Astrophel and Stella published (posthumously) first this year from an unauthorized, corrupt text, with 107 sonnets and 10 songs by Sidney, with other verse by Samuel Daniel, Thomas Campion, Greville, Edward de Vere and others, as well as a preface by Thomas Nashe. The text, copied down by an employee of an associate of Sidney, had so many errors and misreadings that Sidney's friends secured all the unsold copies. The volume was then published again this year in a corrected edition, also unauthorized, with 94 sonnets by Sidney and none of the additional poems. (The poem was again published in about 1597, with at least one source, Mona Wilson, stating 1598. This version of the poem, now commonly used, appeared in the folio of the 1598 version of Sidney's Arcadia, although even that version was not completely free from error. It was prepared under the supervision of his sister, the Countess of Pembroke.)
- Edmund Spenser:
  - Complaints, including "The Ruines of Time"; "The Teares of the Muses"; "Virgils Gnat"; "Prosopopoia; or, Mother Hubberds Tale"; "Muiopotmos"; "Visions of the Words Vanitie"; the volume lampoons William Cecil, 1st Baron Burghley, who had interceded with Queen Elizabeth I to reduce the handsome pension she had originally promised Spenser (see "Events", above); although this volume was printed, it was suppressed (or "called in") almost immediately
- Daphnaïda. An Elegy upon the death of the noble and vertuous Douglas Howard, Daughter and heire of Henry Lord Howard, Viscount Byndon, and wife of Arthure Gorges Esquier (although one source states this was the year of publication, another states the work was first published in London in January 1592, according to one source)

=== Other ===
- Hernando de Acuña, Diverses Poésies, also known as Varias poesías, Spain
- Giordano Bruno, Italian philosopher and poet writing in Latin in a style imitating Lucretius and expressing his philosophical, cosmological speculations in their final form; printed by John Wenchel in Frankfort, Germany:
  - De innumerabilibus immenso et infigurabili
  - De triplici et minimo et mensura
  - De monade numero et figura
- Philippe Desportes, Psaumes, France
- Andrés de Villalta. Flor de varios y nuevos romances, including a ballad by Miguel de Cervantes, Spain

== Births ==
Death years link to the corresponding "[year] in poetry" article:

- February 25 – Friedrich Spee von Langenfeld (died 1635), German Jesuit and poet
- August 24 (baptised) – Robert Herrick (died 1674), English
- November 2 – August Buchner (died 1661), German poet and critic
- Also:
  - Akha Bhagat (Akho) (died 1659), Indian poet, Vedantist and radical
  - Jakob Jakobeus (died 1645), Slovak
  - Alexander Ross, birth year uncertain (died 1654), Scottish poet, author and controversialist
  - Ivan Bunić Vučić (died 1658), Ragusan, Croatian-language poet
  - Julius Wilhelm Zincgref (died 1635), German

== Deaths ==
Birth years link to the corresponding "[year] in poetry" article:

- July 22 – Veronica Franco (born 1546), Italian poet and courtesan
- August 23 – Luis de Leon died (born 1527), Spanish
- December 14 – St. John of the Cross (Spanish: "San Juan de la Cruz"; born Juan de Yepes y Álvarez 1542), Spanish (erysipelas)
- Also – Johann Fischart (born 1546 or 1547), German satirist and publicist

== See also ==
- Poetry
- 16th century in poetry
- 16th century in literature
- Dutch Renaissance and Golden Age literature
- Elizabethan literature
- English Madrigal School
- French Renaissance literature
- Renaissance literature
- Spanish Renaissance literature
- University Wits
