= 1586 in poetry =

List of years in poetry	(table)
- … 1576; 1577; 1578; 1579; 1580; 1581; 1582; 1583; 1584; 1585; 1586; 1587; 1588; 1589; 1590; 1591; 1592; 1593; 1594; 1595; 1596 …
- In literature 1583 1584 1585 1586 1587 1588 1589
- Art; Archaeology; Architecture; Literature; Music; Philosophy; Science; +...

Nationality words link to articles with information on the nation's poetry or literature (for instance, Irish or France).

== Events ==
- September 19 – Imprisoned in the Tower of London on the eve of being hanged, drawn and quartered for his part in the Babington Plot, English poet Chidiock Tichborne writes his Elegy ("My prime of youth is but a frost of cares").
- September 22 – Battle of Zutphen: English poet, critic, courtier and soldier Sir Philip Sidney is fatally wounded.

== Works published ==
=== England ===
- Thomas Churchyard, The Epitaph of Sir Phillip Sidney (Sidney was fatally wounded at the Battle of Zutphen, dying on October 17, 1586)
- Thomas Deloney:
  - The Lamentation of Beckles, a ballad
  - A Most Joyfull Songe, a ballad
- William Warner, Albions England; or, Historicall Map of the Same Island (see also second edition [six books] 1589, third edition [nine books] 1592, fourth edition [12 books] 1596, fifth edition [13 books, with Epitome] 1602, A Continuance of Albions England [books 14–16] 1606)
- Geoffrey Whitney, A Choice of Emblemes and Other Devises, influential emblem book

=== Other ===
- Jan Kochanowski, Piesni ("Songs"), Poland
- Francesco Patrizi, Della poetica la deca disputation, popularly known as the Deca ammirabile, Italian criticism
- Catherine Des Roches, also known as "Catherine Fradonnet", and her mother, Madeleine Des Roches, Les missives de Mesdames des Roches ... (in prose and verse), Paris: Abel L'Angelier; France

== Births ==
Death years link to the corresponding "[year] in poetry" article:

- January 20 – Johann Hermann Schein born (died 1630), German composer
- April 12 (baptised) – John Ford (died c. 1639), English playwright and poet
- August 17 – Johannes Valentinus Andreae born (died 1654), German theologian
- Banarasidas (died 1643), Mughal Indian businessman and poet
- Dirk Rafaelsz Camphuysen (died 1627), Dutch painter, poet and theologian
- Approximate date – Giles Fletcher (died 1623), English poet chiefly known for the allegorical poem Christ's Victory and Triumph

== Deaths ==
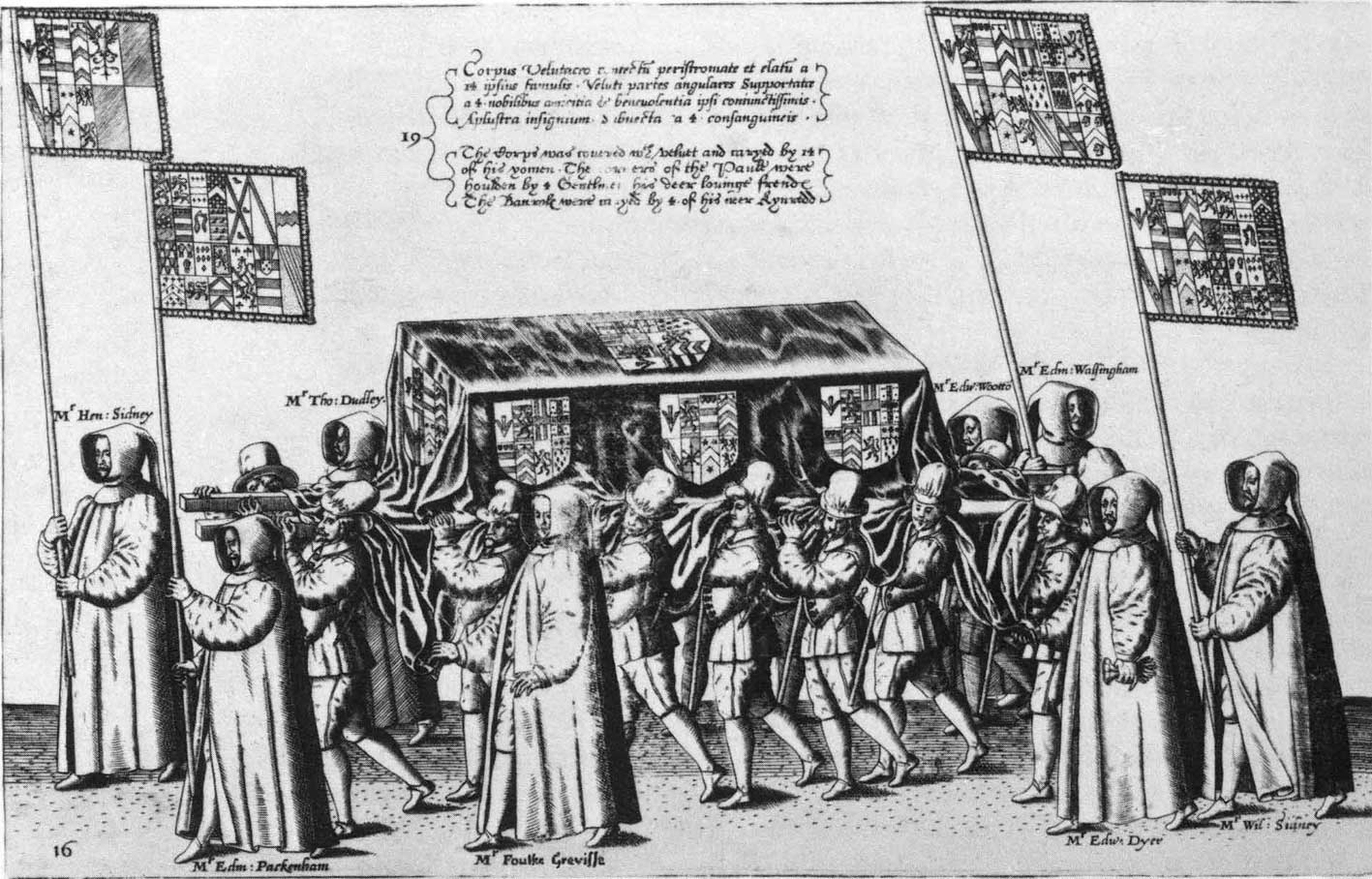
The funeral of Sir Philip Sidney

Birth years link to the corresponding "[year] in poetry" article:

- August 1 – Richard Maitland (born 1496), Scottish poet and lawyer
- September 20 – Chidiock Tichborne (born 1558), English conspirator and poet (executed)
- October 17 – Sir Philip Sidney (born 1554), English poet, courtier and soldier (died of wounds)
- Also:
  - Birbal, real name: Maheshdas Bhat (born 1528), Indian poet, wit and Grand Vizier of the Mughal court of Emperor Akbar
  - Ulpian Fulwell, English
  - Lorenzo Gambara (born c. 1496), Italian, Latin-language poet
  - Sur (born 1479), Indian, Hindu devotional poet

== See also ==
- 16th century in poetry
- 16th century in literature
- Dutch Renaissance and Golden Age literature
- Elizabethan literature
- French Renaissance literature
- Renaissance literature
- Spanish Renaissance literature
- University Wits
