= 1588 in poetry =

List of years in poetry	(table)
- … 1578; 1579; 1580; 1581; 1582; 1583; 1584; 1585; 1586; 1587; 1588; 1589; 1590; 1591; 1592; 1593; 1594; 1595; 1596; 1597; 1598 …
- In literature 1585 1586 1587 1588 1589 1590 1591
- Art; Archaeology; Architecture; Literature; Music; Philosophy; Science; +...

Nationality words link to articles with information on the nation's poetry or literature (for instance, Irish or France).

== Events ==
- May–December – Lope de Vega serves in the Spanish Armada, where he begins writing his epic poem La Hermosura de Angélica.
- Christopher Marlowe writes The Passionate Shepherd to His Love either this year or in 1589 (first published 1599).

== Works published ==
=== Great Britain ===
- William Byrd, editor, Psalmes, Sonets, & Songs of Sadnes and Pietie, Made into Musicke of Five Parts, anthology of verse set to music
- Thomas Churchyard, The Worthines of Wales, prose and poetry
- Angel Day, Daphnis and Chloe, prose and poetry, translated from the French of Jacques Amyot

=== Other ===
- Jean de Sponde, Essai de poemès chrétiens, published with a collection of prose meditations on four Psalms; France

== Births ==
- June 11 – George Wither (died 1667), English poet and satirist
- Guillaume Bautru (died 1665), French satirical poet and a founder member of the Académie française
- Richard Brathwait (died 1673), English poet
- Leonard Digges (died 1635), English translator and poet
- Josua Stegmann (died 1632), German poet

== Deaths ==
- June 18 – Robert Crowley (born 1517), English stationer, poet, polemicist and Protestant clergyman
- November 1 – Jean Daurat also spelled "Jean Dorat"; Latin name: "Auratus" (born 1508), French poet and scholar, member of the Pléiade
- Louis Bellaud (born 1543), French Occitan language writer and poet

== See also ==
- Poetry
- 16th century in poetry
- 16th century in literature
- Dutch Renaissance and Golden Age literature
- Elizabethan literature
- English Madrigal School
- French Renaissance literature
- Renaissance literature
- Spanish Renaissance literature
- University Wits
