= 1530 in poetry =

This article covers 1530 in poetry. Nationality words link to articles with information on the nation's poetry or literature (for instance, Irish or France).

== Works published ==
=== Great Britain ===
- Anonymous, Boccus and Sydrake, publication year uncertain but sometime from this year to 1537, edited by John Twyne, an encyclopedia in dialogue form, derived from the Old French Sidrac, in which Boccus asks 847 questions and Sidrac answers them (see Sidrak and Bokkus).
- Anonymous, Sir Isumbras, publication year uncertain, a romance of separation and reunion of family members, based on the Saint Eustace legend; composed in tail-rhyme in the early 14th century
- Anonymous, Sir Lamwell, publication year uncertain but thought to be from this year to 1532; a version of an Authurian "fairy mistress" tale from Marie de France's Lai de Lanval, written in the second half of the 12th century
- Alexander Barclay, translator, Eclogues, publication year uncertain; translated from De miseria curialium of Enea Silvio de Piccolomini (Pope Pius II)); see also The Boke of Codrus and Mynalcas 1521 and Fifth Eclogue 1518

=== Italy ===
- Pietro Bembo, Italy:
  - Gli Asolani, a dialogue on courtly love, with poems reminiscent of Boccaccio and Petrarch; second, revised edition (see also first edition 1505)
  - Rime, in Italian
- Girolamo Fracastoro, also known as "Fracastorius", Syphilis sive morbus gallicus ("Syphilis, or The French Disease"), an epic poem in five books about a shepherd named Syphilus; the name for syphilis is derived from the work; the poem suggests using mercury and Oil of guaiac as a cure
- Jacopo Sannazaro, Sonetti e Canzoni
- Antonio Tebaldeo, Di M. Antonio Tebaldeo ferrarese l'opere d'amore, published in Venice; Italy

=== Other ===
- Hans Sachs, Das Schlaraffenland, satirical, humorous anecdotes, called "Schwanke", in doggerel verse, Germany

== Births ==
Death years link to the corresponding "[year] in poetry" article:

- November 1 – Étienne de La Boétie (died 1563), French political philosopher and sonnet writer
- Baltasar del Alcázar, (died 1606), Spanish
- François de Belleforest (died 1582), French poet and translator
- Pey de Garros (died 1585), French Occitan language poet writing in Gascon
- Jerónimo Bermúdez (died 1599), Spanish dramatist, poet, and playwright
- Diogo Bernardes born about this year (died c. 1605), brother of Frei Agostinho da Cruz, Portuguese
- Jean de la Ceppede (died 1622), French
- Jan Kochanowski (died 1584), Pole who published poetry in Polish and Latin
- Judah Moscato (died 1593), Italian rabbi, poet, and philosopher
- Giovanni Battista Pigna (died 1575), Italian, Latin-language poet
- William Stevenson (died 1575), English poet, author and clergyman; presumed playwright

== Deaths ==
Birth years link to the corresponding "[year] in poetry" article:

- April 27 (one source states August 6) – Jacopo Sannazaro died (born 1458), Italian poet, humanist and epigrammist who also wrote in Neapolitan and Latin
- April 28 – Niklaus Manuel (born 1484), Swiss, German-language poet
- Also:
  - probably late 1529 or early this year – Juan del Encina (born 1468), Spanish poet, musician and playwright
  - Molla, also known as "Mollamamba", both popular names of Atukuri Molla (born 1440), Indian woman poet who wrote Telugu Ramayan

== See also ==
- Poetry
- 16th century in poetry
- 16th century in literature
- French Renaissance literature
- Renaissance literature
- Spanish Renaissance literature
