= 1614 in poetry =

List of years in poetry	(table)
- … 1604; 1605; 1606; 1607; 1608; 1609; 1610; 1611; 1612; 1613; 1614; 1615; 1616; 1617; 1618; 1619; 1620; 1621; 1622; 1623; 1624 …
- In literature 1611 1612 1613 1614 1615 1616 1617
- Art; Archaeology; Architecture; Literature; Music; Philosophy; Science; +...

Nationality words link to articles with information on the nation's poetry or literature (for instance, Irish or France).

== Events ==
- May 24 – Lope de Vega becomes a priest.

== Works published ==
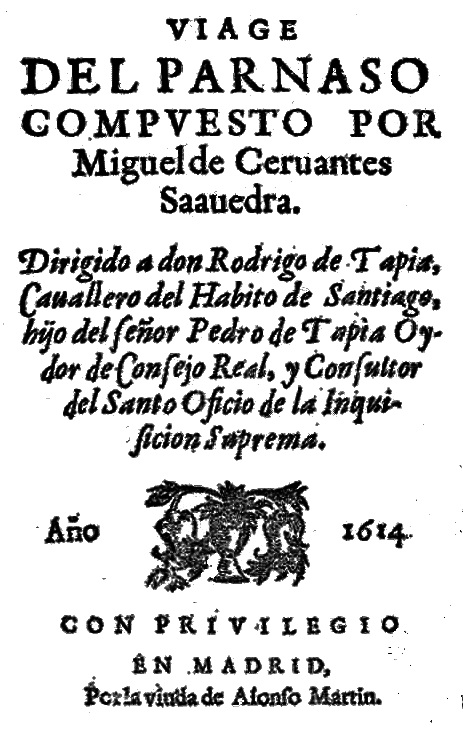
Frontispiece of Miguel de Cervantes' Viaje del Parnaso

=== Great Britain ===
- Anonymous, The Life and Death of Hector, often attributed erroneously to Thomas Heywood; a free paraphrase in modernized verse of John Lydgate's (also anonymously published) Troy Book 1513
- Sir William Alexander, Doomes-day; or, The Great Day of the Lords Judgement
- Richard Brathwaite, published anonymously, The Poets Willow; or, The Passionate Shepheard
- William Browne, The Shepheard's Pipe
- George Chapman:
  - Andromeda Liberata; or, The Nuptials of Perseus and Andromeda, on the marriage of Robert Carr, earl of Somerset, and Frances Howard, formerly countess of Essex
  - Homers Odysses, publication year uncertain, Books 1–12 (see also Seaven Bookes of the Iliades of Homer 1598, Homer Prince of Poets 1609, The Iliads of Homer 1611, Twenty-four Bookes of Homers Odisses 1615, The Whole Workes of Homer 1616)
- Sir Arthur Gorges, Poems by William Drummond. Of Hawthornden, publication year uncertain
- Richard Niccols, The Furies. With Vertues Encomium; or, The Image of Honour
- John Norden, The Labyrinth of Mans Life; or Vertues Delieght and Envies Opposite
- Sir Thomas Overbury, A Wife, Now a Widdowe, expanded edition containing the author's Characters, published posthumously
- Joshua Sylvester, translated from the French of Jean Bertaut, The Parliament of Vertues Royal, also includes translations of verse by Guillaume de Salluste Du Bartas (see also Second Session 1615)
- George Wither, A Satyre

=== Other ===
- Miguel de Cervantes, Viaje del Parnaso, also known as Viaje al Parnaso (Journey to Parnassus"), dedicated to Rodrigo de Tapia and printed by the widow of Alonso Martín, Spain
- Lope de Vega, Rimas sacras, Spain

== Births ==
Death years link to the corresponding "[year] in poetry" article:

- October 12 – Henry More (died 1687), English philosopher and poet
- Also:
  - Nicolaes Borremans (died 1674), Dutch Remonstrants preacher, poet, and editor
  - John Denham born this year or 1615 (died 1669), English poet and courtier
  - Hallgrímur Pétursson (died 1674), one of Iceland's most famous poets and a clergyman

== Deaths ==
Birth years link to the corresponding "[year] in poetry" article:

- October 9 – Bonaventura Vulcanius (born 1538), Dutch humanist scholar and poet
- July 15 – Pierre de Bourdeille, also known as Brantôme (born c. 1540), French soldier, historian, biographer and poet
- Also:
  - Francisco de Andrada (born 1540), Portuguese historian and poet
  - Rhys Cain (born 1540), Welsh-language poet
  - Vitsentzos Kornaros, died this year or 1613 (born 1553), Cretan poet of the Greek Renaissance who wrote the romantic epic poem Erotokritos
  - Luisa Carvajal y Mendoza (born 1566), Spanish aristocrat, religious poet and author
  - Konoe Nobutada (born 1565), Japanese courtier and man of letters known as a poet, calligrapher, painter and diarist
  - Bartosz Paprocki (born 1543), Polish and Czech writer, historiographer, translator, and poet
  - Cristóbal de Virués (born 1550), Spanish playwright and poet

== See also ==
- Poetry
- 16th century in poetry
- 16th century in literature
