= 1601 in poetry =

Nationality words link to articles with information on the nation's poetry or literature (for instance, Irish or France).

== Events ==
- John Donne secretly weds Ann More, niece of Sir Thomas Egerton

== Works ==
=== Great Britain ===
- Nicholas Breton, A Divine Poeme
- Robert Chester, Loues martyr: or, Rosalins complaint
- Henoch Clapham, Aelohim-triune
- Robert Jones:
  - The First Booke of Songes or Ayres of Foure Parts
  - The Second Booke of Songes and Ayres
- Gervase Markham, Marie Magdalens Lamentations for the Losse of her Master Jesus
- Thomas Morley:
  - First Booke of Ayres
  - The Triumphes of Oriana
- William Shakespeare, The Phoenix and the Turtle published in Robert Chester's Loves Martyr
- John Weever, The Mirror of Martyrs; or, The Life and Death of that Thrice Valiant Captaine, and Most Godly Martyre, Sir John Old-castle Knight Lord Cobham

=== Other ===
- Jean Bertaut, Recueil des oeuvres poetiques ("Collection of Poetic Works"), France

== Births ==
- August 22 – Georges de Scudéry (died 1667), French novelist, dramatist and poet; elder brother of Madeleine de Scudéry
- Also:
  - John Earle born about this year (died 1665), English bishop, writer and poet
  - Antonio Enríquez Gómez (died 1661), Spanish dramatist, poet and novelist
  - Saib Tabrizi (died 1677), Persian, master of a form of classical Arabic and Persian lyric poetry known as ghazel

== Deaths ==
- April 10 – Mark Alexander Boyd (born 1562), Scottish poet and soldier of fortune
- By May – Geoffrey Whitney (born 1548), English poet
- August 4 – Edward Grant (born 1548), English scholar, poet and headmaster of Westminster School
- Late – Daniel Hermann (born c. 1543) Polish–Lithuanian diplomat and Neo-Latin poet
- About this year – Thomas Nashe (born 1567), English pamphleteer, poet and satirist

== See also ==
- 16th century in literature
- Dutch Renaissance and Golden Age literature
- Elizabethan literature
- English Madrigal School
- French Renaissance literature
- Renaissance literature
- Spanish Renaissance literature
- University Wits
