= 1599 in poetry =

Nationality words link to articles with information on the nation's poetry or literature (for instance, Irish or France).

== Events ==
- Samuel Daniel becomes poet laureate in England this year (on his death in 1619 he is succeeded by Ben Jonson)

== Works published ==
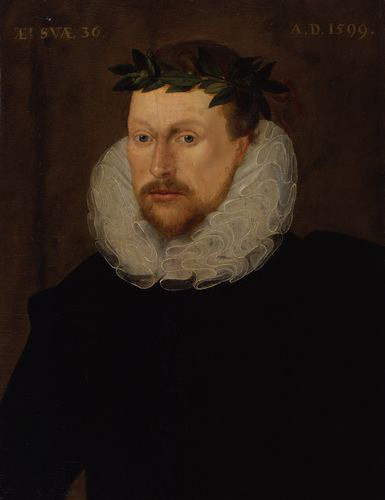
Michael Drayton this year

- Robert Allott, Wits Theater of the Little World (third in the "Wits Series"; see also Ling's Politeuphuia 1597; Meres' Palladis Tamia 1598; Wrednot, Palladis Palatium 1604)
- Nicholas Breton, The Passions of the Spirit, published anonymously
- Thomas Churchyard, The Fortunate Farewel to the Most Forward and Noble Earle of Essex
- Samuel Daniel, The Poeticall Essayes of Sam. Danyel, including The Civiill Wars in five books (see also The First Fowre Bookes 1595, Works [six books] 1601; Civile Wares [eight books] 1609)
- Sir John Davies:
  - Hymnes of Astraea, in Acrosticke Verse, published anonymously
  - Nosce Teipsum (see also Nosce Teipsum 1619, 1622)
- Michael Drayton, Idea
- Christopher Marlowe, translator (posthumous) and Sir John Davies, All Ovids Elegies, three books, publication year uncertain, contains epigrams by Davies
- Thomas Middleton, Micro-Cynicon, attributed to Middleton by some scholars
- William Shakespeare, The Passionate Pilgrime; or, Certaine Amorous Sonnets, only two sheets of the first edition are extant; second edition also published this year; contains 20 poems, including versions of Sonnets 138 and 144, and three extracts from Love's Labour's Lost, and poems by others (see also 1612 edition with nine added poems by Thomas Heywood)
- Edmund Spenser, Prothalamion
- Thomas Storer, The Life and Death of Thomas Wolsey Cardinall
- John Weever, Epigrammes in the Oldest Cut, and Newest Fashion

== Births ==
Death years link to the corresponding "[year] in poetry" article:

- September 7 – Jacob Westerbaen (died 1670), Dutch poet
- December 16 – Jacques Vallée, Sieur Des Barreaux (died 1673), French poet

== Deaths ==
Birth years link to the corresponding "[year] in poetry" article:

- January 13 – Edmund Spenser (born 1552), English poet, died in Westminster and was buried, at the expense of the Earl of Essex, in Poets' Corner at Westminster Abbey next to Geoffrey Chaucer; poets carried his coffin, throwing their verses and pens into his grave
- October 16 – Jakob Regnart (born sometime from 1540 to 1545), Franco-Flemish composer who spent most of his career in Austria and Bohemia, where he wrote both sacred and secular music and poetry in German
- Also:
  - Jerónimo Bermúdez (born 1530), Spanish dramatist, poet, and playwright
  - Giorgio Cichino (born 1514), Italian, Latin-language poet
  - Eknath (born 1533), Marathi language religious poet in the Hindu tradition of India
  - Shah Hussain (born 1538), Punjabi Sufi poet and Sufi saint; born in Lahore (present-day Pakistan); considered a pioneer of the kafi form of Punjabi poetry
  - Dominicus Lampsonius (born 1532), Flemish humanist, poet, and artist
  - Bartholomäus Ringwaldt (born 1532; year of death uncertain), German

== See also ==
- Poetry
- 16th century in poetry
- 16th century in literature
- Dutch Renaissance and Golden Age literature
- Elizabethan literature
- English Madrigal School
- French Renaissance literature
- Renaissance literature
- Spanish Renaissance literature
- University Wits
