= 1529 in poetry =

This article covers 1529 in poetry. Nationality words link to articles with information on the nation's poetry or literature (for instance, Irish or France).

== Works published ==
- Anonymous, Solomon and Marcolphus, publication year uncertain, England
- Giangiorgio Trissino, La poetica, Books 1–4 (Books 5–6 published in 1563), Italy

== Births ==
Death years link to the corresponding "[year] in poetry" article:

- June 7 – Étienne Pasquier (died 1615), French poet and author
- Also:
  - Johann Beltz (died 1584), German
  - Olivier de Magny (died 1561), French poet
  - Guy Du Faur, Seigneur de Pibrac (died 1584), French jurist and poet
  - George Puttenham (died 1590), English writer and critic

== Deaths ==
Birth years link to the corresponding "[year] in poetry" article:

- June 21 – John Skelton died (born c. 1460), English
- Also:
  - Biernat of Lublin Polish: "Biernat z Lublina", died sometime after this year (born c. 1465), Polish
  - Andrea Navagero (born 1483), Italian, Latin-language poet
  - Baldassarre Castiglione (born 1477), Italian writer and poet who also wrote verses in Latin
- Krishnadevaraya (born 1471), Emperor of the Vijayanagara Empire and influential patron of poetry

== See also ==
- Poetry
- 16th century in poetry
- 16th century in literature
- Dutch Renaissance and Golden Age literature
- French Renaissance literature
- Renaissance literature
- Spanish Renaissance literature
