= 1658 in poetry =

This article covers 1658 in poetry. Nationality words link to articles with information on the nation's poetry or literature (for instance, Irish or France).

== Works published ==
- Nicholas Billingsley, Kosmobrephia; or, The Infancy of the World, mostly poetry
- Richard Brathwaite, The Honest Ghost; or, A Voice from the Vault, published anonymously, mostly poetry
- Sir Aston Cockayne, Small Poems of Divers Sorts (see also Poems 1662)
- Henry Lawes, Ayres, and Dialogues, for One, Two, and Three Voyces, verse and music (see also Ayres and Dialogues 1653, The Second Book of Ayres and Dialogues 1655)
- Georg Stiernhielm, Hercules, the first hexametrical poem in Swedish
- Edmund Waller and Sidney Godolphin, translators, The Passion of Dido for Aeneas, translated from the Latin of Virgil's Aeneid

== Births ==
Death years link to the corresponding "[year] in poetry" article:

- Charles Mordaunt, 3rd Earl of Peterborough (died 1735), English

== Deaths ==
Birth years link to the corresponding "[year] in poetry" article:

- Gabriel Bocángel (born 1603), Spanish playwright and poet
- John Cleveland (born 1613), English
- Georg Philipp Harsdorffer (born 1607), German poet and translator
- Benjamin Rudyerd (born 1572), English politician and poet
- Ivan Bunić Vučić (born 1591), Ragusan, Croatian-language poet

== See also ==
- Poetry
- 17th century in poetry
- 17th century in literature
