= 1541 in literature =

This article contains information about the literary events and publications of 1541.

== Events ==
- Late August – Siege of Buda: Ottoman Bektashi dervish poet Gül Baba, companion of Sultan Suleiman the Magnificent, believed killed or died during or immediately after the Ottoman relief of Buda.
- Elia Levita's chivalric romance, the Bovo-Bukh, is first printed, the earliest published secular work in Yiddish.
- unknown dates
  - The Gustav Vasa Bible, the first official translation of the entire Bible into Swedish, Biblia, Thet är All then Helgha Scrifft på Swensko, is published in Upsala.
  - The first complete translation of the New Testament into Hungarian, Újszövetség, is the first book printed in Hungary, at Sárvár.
  - John Calvin translates his Institutio Christianae religionis into French as L'Institution chrétienne.

== New books ==
=== Prose ===
- George Buchanan
  - Baptistes
  - Jephtha
- Joachim Sterck van Ringelbergh – Lucubrationes vel potius absolutissima kyklopaideia

=== Drama ===
- Lodovico Dolce – Il ragazzo
- Giovanni Battista Giraldi – Orbecche

=== Poetry ===
- Anonymous – The Schole House of Women
- Francesco Berni (died 1535) – Orlando innamorato
- Jacques Pelletier du Mans – Ars Poetica (translation into French from Latin of Horace)

== Births ==
- January 26 – Florent Chrestien, French satirist and Latin poet (died 1596)

== Deaths ==
- April 24 – Celio Calcagnini, Ferraran polymath and Latin poet (born 1479)
- August
  - Gül Baba, Ottoman Bektashi dervish poet (birthdate unknown)
  - Juan de Valdés, Spanish religious writer (born 1500)
- unknown date – Giovanni Guidiccioni, Italian bishop and poet (born 1480)
