= 1596 in literature =

This article contains information about the literary events and publications of 1596.

== Events ==
- January 20 – The first complete edition of The Faerie Queene is published in six books.
- February – James Burbage buys the disused Blackfriars Theatre from Sir William More for £600, but is prevented from using it for theater by the opposition of wealthy influential neighbors.
- June 22 – Lord Hunsdon dies; his place as Lord Chamberlain will be taken by William Brooke, 10th Baron Cobham, who is sympathetic to the Puritans and hostile to the English Renaissance theatre. With Cobham's allowance, Thomas Skinner, Lord Mayor of the City of London bans players from the City and tears down several inn-yard theatres: the Bel Savage Inn, the Cross Keys Inn, and others. Cobham dies the next year, 1597.
- July – English forces under Robert Devereux, 2nd Earl of Essex, returning from the Capture of Cádiz, burn Faro, Portugal, but seize books from the library of scholar Fernando Martins Mascarenhas, Bishop of Faro, which will be transferred to the Bodleian Library in the University of Oxford.
- date unknown – The novel Jin Ping Mei (金瓶梅, The Plum in the Golden Vase) by "Lanling Xiaoxiao Sheng" circulates in manuscript in China.

== New books ==
=== Prose ===
- Thomas Harriot – Brief and True Report of the New Found Land of Virginia
- Richard Johnson – The Famous Historie of the Seaven Champions of Christendom
- Thomas Nashe – Have with You to Saffron-Walden

=== Drama ===
- Anonymous – Captain Thomas Stukeley
- William Burton – De Amoribus Perinthii et Tyanthes
- George Chapman – The Blind Beggar of Alexandria
- Antoine de Montchrestien – Sophonisbe
- Lope de Vega
  - Los comendadores de Córdoba
  - Los donaires de Matico
  - El marqués de Mantua
  - El remedio en la desdicha
- Thomas Kyd (probably, perhaps with Shakespeare) – The Raigne of King Edward the Third (published)
- William Shakespeare – Henry IV, Part 1

=== Poetry ===
- Thomas Campion – Poemata
- Bartholomew Griffin – Fidessa
- Francisco Rodrigues Lobo – Romances
- Edmund Spenser – Colin Clouts Come Home Againe

== Births ==
- March 31 – René Descartes, French philosopher (died 1650)
- August 18 – Jean Bolland, Flemish Jesuit writer (died 1665)
- September
  - Moses Amyraut, French Protestant theologian (died 1664)
  - James Shirley, English dramatist (died 1666)
- September 4 – Constantijn Huygens, Dutch poet (died 1687)
- Unknown date – Lucas Holstenius, German humanist (died 1661)
- Probable year of birth – Udriște Năsturel, Wallachian scholar and poet (died c. 1658)

== Deaths ==
- February 16 – Friedrich Sylburg, German classical scholar (born 1536)
- February 19 – Blaise de Vigenère, French cryptographer, diplomat, scientist, and author (born 1523)
- August 11 (bur.) – Hamnet Shakespeare, English schoolboy, son of William (born 1585)
- October 3 – Florent Chrestien, French writer (born 1541)
- November 1 – Pierre Pithou, French lawyer and scholar (born 1539)
- November 9 (bur.) – George Peele, English dramatist and poet (born 1556)
- Unknown date
  - Madeleine de l’Aubespine, French poet and patron (born 1546)
  - Jean Bodin, French political philosopher (born 1530)
- Probable year of death – Henry Willobie, English poet (born 1575)
