= 1584 in poetry =

This article covers 1584 in poetry. Nationality words link to articles with information on the nation's poetry or literature (for instance, Irish or France).

== Works published ==
=== France ===
- Guillaume de Salluste Du Bartas, Seconde Semaine ou Enfance du monde, unfinished.
- Pierre de Ronsard, the collective in-folio edition of his works
- Honoré d'Urfé, La Sireine

=== Great Britain ===
- Robert Greene, The Debate between Folly and Love, translated from the French of part of Louise Labbe's Débat de Folie et d'Amour, London: Ponsonby; many editions in the 16th, 17th and 19th centuries
- King James VI, The Essayes of a Prentise, in the Divine Art of Poesie
- Anthony Munday, I Serve a Mistress
- Thomas Phaer, The Thirteen Books of Aeneidos, Boox 10–12 translated by Thomas Twyne; Book 13 by Maffeo Vegio (see also The Seven First Bookes 1558, The Nyne First Bookes 1562, The Whole Twelve Bookes 1573)
- Clement Robinson "and Divers Others", A Handful of Pleasant Delights

=== Other ===
- Jan Kochanowski, Fraszki ("Trifles"), Poland

== Births ==
- February 12 – Barlaeus, also known as Kaspar van Baerle (died 1648), Dutch
- September 15 – Georg Rudolf Weckherlin (died 1653), German
- Also:
  - Francis Beaumont (died 1616), English playwright and poet
  - Anna Ovena Hoyer born (died 1655), German
  - Anna Visscher (died 1651), Dutch artist, poet, and translator
  - Georg Rodolf Weckherlin born (died 1653), German
  - Diederich von dem Werder born (died 1657), German

== Deaths ==
- March 10 – Thomas Norton (born 1532), politician and poet
- August 22 – Jan Kochanowski (born 1530), Pole who published poetry in Polish and Latin
- Also:
  - Johann Beltz (born 1529), German
  - Lucas de Heere (born 1534), Flemish portrait painter, poet and writer
  - Guy Du Faur, Seigneur de Pibrac (born 1529), French jurist and poet
  - Sur, died sometime from 1581 to this year (born 1478 or 1479), Indian, Hindi poet and saint who wrote in the Brij Bhasha dialect
  - 1584/1585/1586: Ulpian Fulwell (born 1545/1546), English Renaissance theatre playwright, satirist and poet

== See also ==
- Poetry
- 16th century in poetry
- 16th century in literature
- Dutch Renaissance and Golden Age literature
- Elizabethan literature
- French Renaissance literature
- Renaissance literature
- Spanish Renaissance literature
- University Wits
