= Robin Clidro =

Welsh poet and minstrel

Robin Clidro (1545–1580) was a Welsh language poet and itinerant minstrel from Denbighshire, North Wales.

Few details are available about Clidro's life. His surviving work is characterised by a lighter tone, in contrast to the professional poets of his era.

== See also ==
Robin Clidro at Wikisource
