= 1541 in poetry =

This article covers 1541 in poetry. Nationality words link to articles with information on the nation's poetry or literature (for instance, Irish or France).

== Works published ==
=== French language ===
- Jacques Peletier, translation from the Latin of Horace, Ars Poetica, France
- Clément Marot, Trente psaumes de David, translation of the Book of Psalms, France
- Loys Bourgeois sometime between this year and 1551, Psautier huguenot, Switzerland

=== Other ===
- Anonymous, The Schole House of Women, sometimes attributed to Edward Gosynhyll, but which he replied to in The Prayse of all Women 1542; two other replies: A Dyalogue Defensyve for Women against Malycyous Detractours 1542, by Robert Burdet and The Defence of Women 1560, Edward More; Great Britain
- Francesco Berni Orlando innamorato, heroic-comic poem, published posthumously, Italy

== Births ==
Death years link to the corresponding "[year] in poetry" article:

== Deaths ==
Birth years link to the corresponding "[year] in poetry" article:

- Giovanni Guidiccioni (born 1480), Italian
- Gül Baba (born unknown), Ottoman Bektashi dervish poet and companion of Sultan Suleiman the Magnificent
- Celio Calcagnini (born 1479), Italian, Latin-language poet

== See also ==
- Poetry
- 16th century in poetry
- 16th century in literature
- French Renaissance literature
- Renaissance literature
- Spanish Renaissance literature
