= Sun Kehong =

Chinese landscape painter, calligrapher, and poet

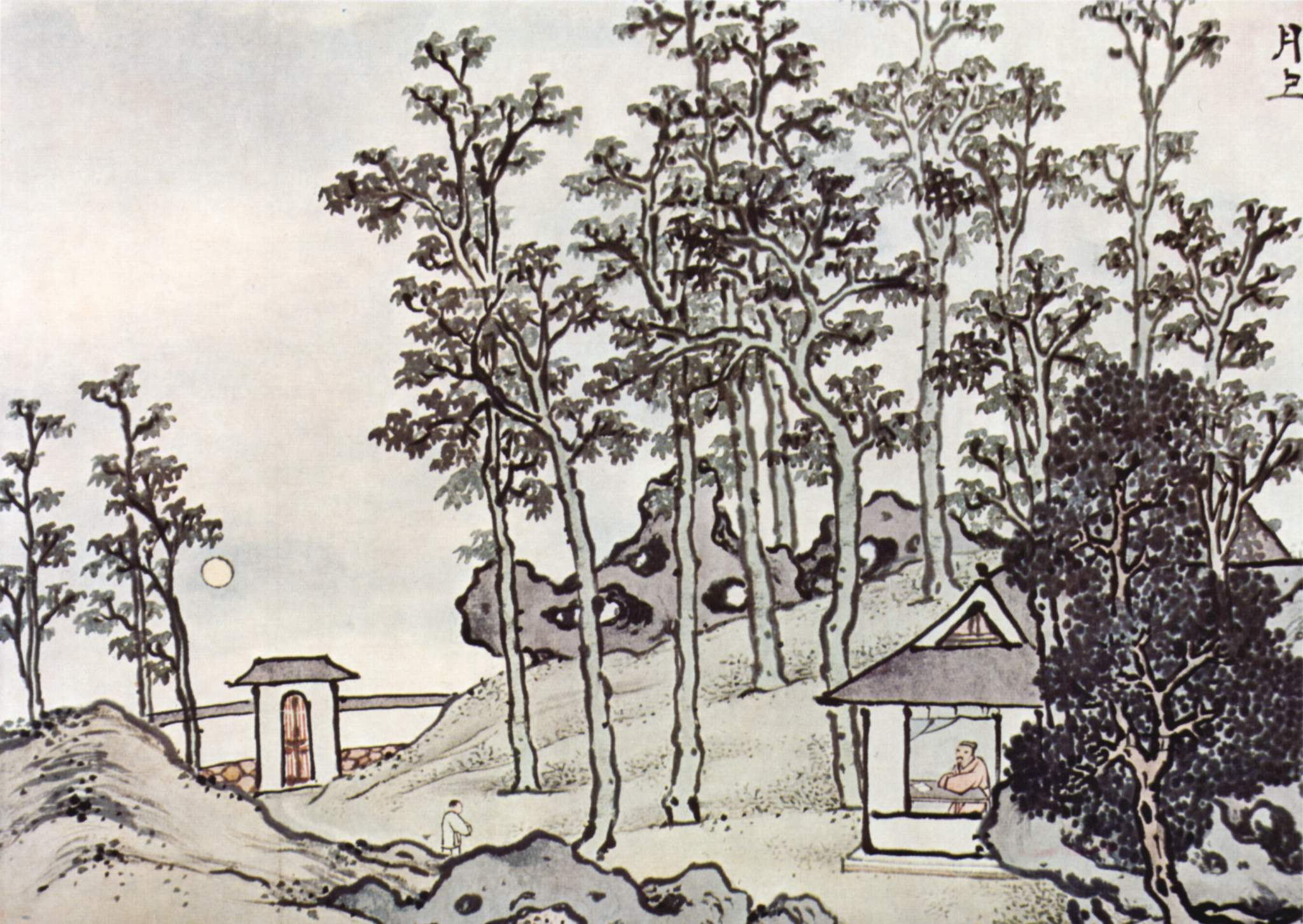
Sun Kehong, The Rising Moon, National Palace Museum

Sūn Kèhóng (Sun K'o-hung, traditional: 孫克弘, simplified: 孙克弘); ca. 1533-1611 was a Chinese landscape painter, calligrapher, and poet during the Ming dynasty (1368–1644).

Sun was born in Huating in the Shanghai province. His style name was 'Yunzhi' and his sobriquet was 'Xueju'. Sun's painting followed the style of Shen Zhou and Lu Zhi. Sun used colorful and minute techniques in his earlier works, then later used a more terse and free style. In addition to landscapes Sun painted flower and bird and bamboo and stone works.
