= Luigi Alamanni =

Italian poet and statesman (1495–1556)

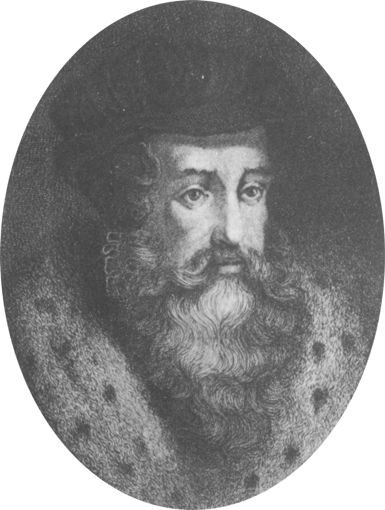
Luigi Alamanni

Luigi Alamanni (sometimes spelt Alemanni) (6 March 1495 – 18 April 1556) was an Italian poet and statesman. He was regarded as a prolific and versatile poet. He was credited with introducing the epigram into Italian poetry.

== Biography ==
Alamanni was born in Florence. His father was a devoted adherent of the Medici party, but Luigi, smarting under a supposed injustice, joined an unsuccessful conspiracy against Giulio de' Medici, soon to be elected Pope Clement VII. Consequently, he was forced to take refuge in Venice, and, on the accession of Medici to pope, to flee to France. When Florence had exiled the Medici in 1527, Alamanni returned, and took a prominent part in the management of the affairs of the short-lived republic.

The Florentines had thrown off Medici rule and established a republic after the Sack of Rome in 1527; the Florentine Republic had continued to participate in the war on the side of the French. The French defeats at Naples in 1528 and Landriano in 1529, however, led to Francis I of France concluding the Treaty of Cambrai with the Holy Roman Emperor Charles V. When Pope Clement VII and the Republic of Venice also concluded treaties with the Emperor, Florence was left to fight alone. Charles, attempting to gain Clement's favor, ordered his armies to seize Florence and return the Medici to power.

After the siege of Florence in 1530 by Imperial forces, succeeded in restoring the Medici to the duchy, Alamanni again fled, this time to France, where he composed the greater part of his works. He was a favourite with the French King Francis I, who sent him as ambassador to the Holy Roman Emperor Charles V after the Peace of Crépy in 1544.

An instance of Alammani's diplomatic tact is reflected in an encounter with the emperor. Alamanni, while giving a complimentary address to Charles, was interrupted by the emperor who quoted a line from a satirical poem of Alamanni: "l'aquila grifagna, Che per piu devorar, duoi rostri porta" ("Two crooked bills the ravenous eagle bears, The better to devour"). The double eagle was a symbol of the Hapsburg monarchy. Upon this interruption, Alamanni immediately replied that he spoke that line only as a poet using fictions, now as an ambassador, he could only speak the truth. The ready reply pleased Charles, who added some complimentary words.

After the death of Francis, Alamanni enjoyed the confidence of his successor Henry II, and in 1551 was sent as his ambassador to Genoa. He died at Amboise on 18 April 1556.

He wrote a large number of poems, distinguished by the purity and excellence of their style. The best is a didactic poem, La Coltivazione (Paris, 1546; see 1546 in poetry), written in imitation of Virgil's Georgics. His Opere Toscane (Lyon, 1532) consists of satirical pieces written in blank verse. His use of Horatian epistolary satire is important and his tenth satire was used as a model by Sir Thomas Wyatt in his poem 'Mine own John Poyntz' which introduced the form into English literature. An unfinished poem, Avarchide, in imitation of the Iliad, was the work of his old age and has little merit.

It has been said by some that Alamanni was the first to use blank verse in Italian poetry, but that distinction belongs rather to his contemporary Giangiorgio Trissino.

The contemporary poet Isabella di Morra dedicated a sonnet to Alamanni called Non sol il ciel vi fu largo e cortese ("Not only was heaven generous and courteous to you").

Alamanni is a minor speaker in Machiavelli's The Art of War, a book structured as a dialogue between real people known to Machiavelli, and set in the gardens of Cosimo Rucellai. In this book, Alamanni is present as a loyal friend of the host, and is mentioned to be the youngest of Rucellai's friends present.

== Bibliography ==
- A poetical romance, Girone il Cortese (Paris, 1548; see 1548 in poetry)
- A tragedy, Antigone
- A comedy, Flora
