= Ginés Pérez de Hita =

Spanish novelist and poet (c. 1544 – c. 1619)

Ginés Pérez de Hita (1544? – 1619?) was a Spanish novelist and poet, born at Mula (Murcia) about the middle of the 16th century.

It is likely that he joined the campaign against the "Moriscos" in the Alpujarra in 1560.

== Guerras civiles de Granada ==
Pérez de Hita owes his wide celebrity to the Historia de los bandos de los Zegríes y Abencerrajes (1595–1619), better known as the Guerras civiles de Granada ("Wars of Granada"), which purports to be a chronicle based on an Arabic original ascribed to a certain Aben-Hamin. Abed-Hamin is a fictitious character, and the "Wars of Granada" is, in reality, a historical novel, perhaps the earliest example of its kind, and certainly the first historical novel that attained popularity.

In the first part, the events which led to the downfall of Granada are related with uncommon brilliancy, and Pérez de Hita's sympathetic transcription of life at the Emir's court has clearly suggested the conventional presentation of the picturesque, chivalrous Moor in the pages of Mlle de Scudéry, Mme de Lafayette, Châteaubriand and Washington Irving.

The second part is concerned with the author's personal experiences and the treatment is effective; yet, though Calderón's play, Amar después de la muerte, is derived from it, this less picturesque second part has never enjoyed the vogue or influence of the first. The exact date of Pérez de Hita's death is unknown. His blank verse rendering of the Crónica Troyana, written in 1596, exists in manuscript.

== Sources ==
- Herbermann, Charles, ed. (1911). "Ginés Pérez de Hita" . Catholic Encyclopedia. Vol. 11. New York: Robert Appleton Company.
