= Robert Burrant =

English translator

Robert Burrant (fl. 1553) was an English translator.

He authored works such as an edition of Sir David Lyndsay's Tragical Death of Dauid Beatõ[n], Bishoppe of sainct Andrewes in Scotland: whereunto is joyned the martyrdom of Maister George Wyseharte, gentleman ... for the blessed Gospels sake, printed by J. Day and W. Serres. This extremely rare volume is in the Grenville Library in the British Museum. It contains a long preface from Roberte Burrante to the Reader, in which, after twenty pages on the judgments of God against evil-doers, he speaks of Beaton's enmity against the gospel and against England, of his habit of swearing, and of his condemnation of George Wishart on 31 March 1546. He also published a translation of the Preceptes of Cato, with annotacions of D. Erasmus of Roterodame, very profitable for all menne, dedicated to Sir Thomas Caverden, and printed by R. Grafton in 1553.
