= 1613 in poetry =

List of years in poetry	(table)
- … 1603; 1604; 1605; 1606; 1607; 1608; 1609; 1610; 1611; 1612; 1613; 1614; 1615; 1616; 1617; 1618; 1619; 1620; 1621; 1622; 1623 …
- In literature 1610 1611 1612 1613 1614 1615 1616
- Art; Archaeology; Architecture; Literature; Music; Philosophy; Science; +...

Nationality words link to articles with information on the nation's poetry or literature (for instance, Irish or France).

== Events ==
- English poet Francis Quarles attends on the newly-married Elizabeth Stuart, Queen of Bohemia.

== Works published ==
=== Great Britain ===
- Nicholas Breton, anonymously published, The Uncasing of Machivils Instructions to his Sonne
- William Drummond of Hawthornden, Tears on the Death of Moeliades
- Henry Parrot, Laquei Ridiculosi; or, Springes for Woodcocks
- George Wither:
  - Abuses Stript, and Whipt; or, Satirical Essayes
  - Epithalamia; or, Nuptiall Poems, the work states "1612" but was published this year
- Richard Zouch, The Dove; or, Passages of Cosmography

==== On the death of Henry Frederick, Prince of Wales in 1612 ====
See also 1612 in poetry

The November 6, 1612 death of Henry Frederick, Prince of Wales, at age 18, occasions these poems:

- Thomas Campion, Songs of Mourning: Bewailing the Untimely Death of Prince Henry, verse and music; music by Giovanni Coperario (or "Copario"), said to have been John Cooper, an Englishman
- George Chapman, An Epicede or Funerall Song, the work states "1612" but was published this year
- John Davies, The Muses-Teares for the Losse of their Hope
- William Drummond of Hawthornden, Tears on the Death of Moeliades
- Joshua Sylvester, Lachrimae Lachrimarum; or, The Distillation of Teares Shede for the Untimely Death of the Incomparable Prince Panaretus, originally published in 1612, the book went into its third edition this year, with Elegy upon [...] Prince Henry by John Donne added to this edition; (also includes poems in English, French, Latin and Italian by Walter Quin)

=== Spain ===
- La Fábula de Polifemo y Galatea by Luis de Góngora y Argote

== Births ==
Death years link to the corresponding "[year] in poetry" article:

- January 20 – Lucy Hastings (died 1679), Irish-born English poet and Countess of Huntingdon
- April 21 (bapt.) – Franciscus Plante (died 1690), Dutch poet and chaplain
- June 16 – John Cleveland (died 1658), English
- November 5 – Isaac de Benserade (died 1691), French
- Also:
  - Richard Crashaw, born about this year (died 1649), English poet, styled "the divine," one of the Metaphysical poets
  - Shah Inayatullah (died 1701), poet from Sindh, Pakistan
  - Khushal Khattak (died 1689), Pashtun warrior, poet and tribal chief
  - Ye Xiaowan born about this year, Chinese poet and daughter of poet Shen Yixiu; also sister of women poets Ye Wanwan and Ye Xiaoluan

== Deaths ==
Birth years link to the corresponding "[year] in poetry" article:

- January 2 – Salima Sultan Begum (Makhfi) (born 1539), Mughal empress consort and Urdu poet
- March – Lupercio Leonardo de Argensola, (born 1559), Spanish playwright and poet
- April 6–9 – Natshinnaung (born (1578), Toungoo prince, poet and musician (executed)
- August 22 – Dominicus Baudius (born 1561), Dutch Neo-Latin poet, scholar and historian
- September 15 – Sir Thomas Overbury (born 1581), English poet and essayist (probably poisoned by Frances Howard, Countess of Somerset)
- October 9 – Henry Constable (born 1562), English Catholic polemicist and poet
- October 22 – Mathurin Régnier (born 1573), French satirical poet; nephew of Philippe Desportes
- November 16 – Trajano Boccalini (born 1556), Italian satirical poet
- Also:
  - Govindadasa (born 1535), Bengali Vaishnava poet known for his body of devotional songs addressed to Krishna
  - Phùng Khắc Khoan (born 1528), Vietnamese military strategist, politician, diplomat and poet
  - Dinko Zlatarić (born 1558), Croatian poet and translator

== See also ==
- Poetry
- 17th century in poetry
- 17th century in literature
