= 1553 in poetry =

This article covers 1553 in poetry.

The batalis and the man I wil discrive,

Fra Troys boundis first that fugitive
By fait to Ytail come and cost Lavyne;
Our land and sey kachit with mekil pyne,
By fors of goddis abuse, from euery steid,
Of cruell Juno throu ald remembrit fede.
Gret pane in batail sufferit he alsso,
Or he his goddis brocht in Latio,
And belt the cite, fra quham, of nobill fame,
The Latyne pepill takyn heth thar name,
And eik the faderis, princis of Alba,

Cam, and the wallaris of gret Rome alswa.

— Opening lines from Gavin Douglas' Eneados, a translation, into Middle Scots of Virgil's Aeneid

== Events ==
- Joachim du Bellay accompanies (and is secretary to) his cousin, Cardinal Jean du Bellay, on a visit to Rome which lasts until August 1557. In Rome, the poet continues to write works which will be published in 1558.

== Works published ==
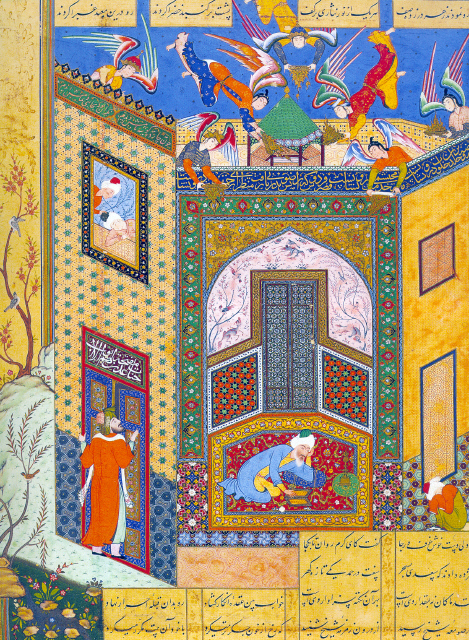
Illustration from Persian poet Jami's Rose Garden of the Pious

=== France ===
- Olivier de Magny:
  - Les Amours 102 sonnets addressed to "Castianire", often identified as Louise Labe, preceded by a sonnet often attributed to her; Paris: Estienne Groulleau, France
  - Hymne sur la naissance de Madame, fille du roi très chrestien Henry, Arnoul L'Angelier, Paris; France
- Pierre de Ronsard, Livret de Folâtries

=== Other ===
- Ludovico Ariosto, Carminum Lib. Quatuor, also known as Carmina, edited by Giovanni Battista Pigna
- Jami, Rose Garden of the Pious (illustrated version in the Arthur Sackler Gallery, Washington, D.C.)
- Anonymous, Pierce the Ploughmans Crede, Great Britain
- Gavin Douglas, Scottish poet (who wrote in Middle Scots):
  - Eneados ("Aeneid"), translated from the Latin of Virgil's Aeneid 1512–1513; with Book 13 by Maffeo Vegio; the first complete translation of any major work of classical antiquity into an Anglic language; the first printed edition, published in London by the press of William Copland; the edition displays an anti–Roman Catholic bias, in that references (in the prologues) to the Virgin Mary, Purgatory, and Catholic ceremonies are altered or omitted; 66 lines of the translation, describing the amour of Dido and Aeneas, are omitted as indelicate.
  - The Palis of Honoure, publication year uncertain; second edition, substantially changed

== Births ==
- March 29 – Vitsentzos Kornaros (died 1613 or 1614), Cretan poet of the Greek Renaissance, writer of the romantic epic poem Erotokritos
- John Lyly born this year or 1554 (died 1606), English writer, dramatist and poet

== Deaths ==
- March 17 – Girolamo Fracastoro, also known as "Fracastorius" (born 1478), Italian (Venetian), physician, scholar (in mathematics, geography and astronomy), atomist and Latin-language poet
- Also:
  - Erasmus Alberus (born c. 1500), German
  - Hanibal Lucić died about this year (born 1485), Croatian poet and playwright
  - Yamazaki Sōkan 山崎宗鑑, pen name of Shina Norishige (born 1465), Japanese renga and haikai poet, court calligrapher for Shōgun Ashikaga Yoshihisa; became a secluded Buddhist monk following the shōgun's death in 1489

== See also ==
- Poetry
- 16th century in poetry
- 16th century in literature
- Dutch Renaissance and Golden Age literature
- French Renaissance literature
- Renaissance literature
- Spanish Renaissance literature
