= Julius Wilhelm Zincgref =

German writer

Julius Wilhelm Zincgref (Latin: Zengravius; 3 June 1591 – 12 November 1635) was a German poet and editor. His main work is the Apophthegmata, der Teutschen scharpfsinnige kluge Sprüch (1626–1631), a collection of sayings and anecdotes.
