= 1590 in poetry =

Nationality words link to articles with information on the nation's poetry or literature (for instance, Irish or France).

== Events ==
- With the encouragement of Sir Walter Raleigh, Edmund Spenser joins him on a trip to London, where Raleigh presented the celebrated poet to Queen Elizabeth I.

== Works ==
- George Peele, Polyhymnia
- Edmund Spenser, The Faerie Queene, Books 1-3, in honour of Queen Elizabeth I
- Sir Philip Sidney, The Countesse of Pembrokes Arcadia, Books 1–3 (see also expanded editions of 1593, 1598, 1621, etc.)

== Births ==
Death years link to the corresponding "[year] in poetry" article:

- March 18 – Manuel de Faria e Sousa (died 1649), Portuguese historian and poet
- June 24 – Samuel Ampzing (died 1632), Dutch clergyman and poet
- September 12 – María de Zayas (died 1661), Spanish poet and playwright
- Also:
  - Baltasar del Alcazar born (died 1606), Spanish
  - William Browne (died 1645), English
  - Shen Yixiu (died 1635), Chinese poet and mother of female poets Ye Xiaoluan, Ye Wanwan and Ye Xiaowan
  - Faqi Tayran, also spelled "Feqiyê Teyran", pen name of Mir Mihemed (died 1660), Kurdish
  - Hu Wenru (flourished about this year), Chinese official courtesan known for her poetry painting and playing the qin
  - Théophile de Viau (died 1626), French poet and playwright
  - Xu Yuan (poet) (flourished about this year), Chinese woman poet nicknamed "Xie reincarnate" in reference to Xie Daoyun

== Deaths ==
Birth years link to the corresponding "[year] in poetry" article:

- March – Petru Cercel (born unknown), Wallachian prince and poet
- August 28 – Guillaume de Salluste Du Bartas (born 1544), French writer and poet
- November 29 – Philipp Nicodemus Frischlin (born 1547), German philologist, poet, playwright, mathematician and astronomer
- September 20 – Robert Garnier (born 1544), French poet and playwright
- Also:
  - George Puttenham (born 1529), English writer and critic
  - Étienne Tabourot (born 1549), French

== See also ==
- Poetry
- 16th century in poetry
- 16th century in literature
- Dutch Renaissance and Golden Age literature
- Elizabethan literature
- English Madrigal School
- French Renaissance literature
- Renaissance literature
- Spanish Renaissance literature
- University Wits
