= Giovanni Guidiccioni =

Italian poet

Giovanni Guidiccioni (1480 in Lucca – 1541 in Macerata) was an Italian poet and a Catholic bishop of Fossombrone.

== Biography ==
Born at Lucca in 1480, Guidiccioni was a nephew of Bartolomeo Guidiccioni and eventually occupied a high position. When Alessandro Farnese became Pope on 12 October 1534 with the name of Paul III, Giovanni was appointed bishop of Fossombrone and, the following year, Apostolic nuncio to the court of Charles V in Spain.
Appointed president of Romagna in August 1537, the latter office nearly cost him his life. A murderer attempted to kill him, and had already touched the bishop's breast with his dagger when, conquered by the resolute calmness of the prelate, he threw away the weapon and fell at Guidiccioni's feet, asking for forgiveness.

The Rime and Letters of Guidiccioni are models of elegant and natural Italian style. His best-known work, though usually wrongly attributed to others, was the text to the madrigal Il bianco e dolce cigno by Jacques Arcadelt.
