= Itinerant poet =

Wandering minstrel, bard, or other poet

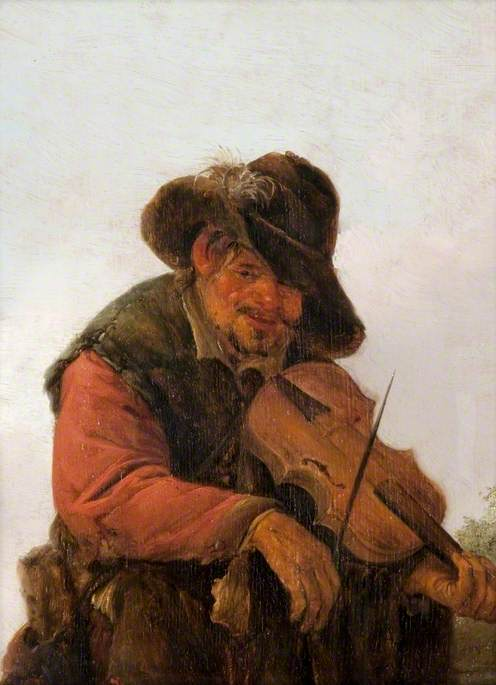
An Itinerant Musician (c. 1650) by Adriaen van Ostade

An itinerant poet or strolling minstrel (also known variously as a gleeman, circler, or cantabank) was a wandering minstrel, bard, musician, or other poet common in medieval Europe but extinct today. Itinerant poets were from a lower class than jesters or jongleurs, as they did not have steady work, instead travelling to make a living.

== Medieval performers ==
In medieval England, a gleeman was a reciter of poetry. Like a scop, a gleeman performed poetry to the accompaniment of a harp or "glee wood". Gleemen occasionally attached themselves to a particular court but were most often wandering entertainers; this is unlike scops, who were more static. Gleemen were also less likely to compose or perform their own poetry and relied on the work of others for their material.

A source cited that the number of itinerant poets were augmented by disgraced courtiers, clairvoyants, and even the deformed as these entertainers formed troupes and catered to the whims of individual patrons. An example of a notable itinerant poet was Till Eulenspiegel, a fictional character famous in the 12th century. These examples, however, do indicate that itinerant poets were merely fools working to elicit laughter with their acts. There are those suggested as geniuses such as Scottish bards and performers of the harp who were credited with composing and preserving "many fine old songs".

== Ancient strolling songsters ==
Prior to the emergence of medieval itinerant poets, there were already strolling minstrels in ancient Greece. An account also identified these strolling songsters as Rhapsodists during Homer's time. These were more than entertainers, with an account describing them as men who recorded honorable feats and aristocratic genealogies. They were thus supported by a culture of patronage. Even in ancient England, their skill was considered divine and their person as sacred. They were accorded honor and reward everywhere they performed. Both in Ireland and Scotland, every chief or Regulus had his own bard, who not only entertained but also served as an ambassador.

== See also ==
- Marx Augustin
