= 1546 in literature =

This article contains information about the literary events and publications of 1546.

== Events ==
- July 17 – Peter Faber, appointed by Pope Paul III to act as a peritus on behalf of the Holy See at the Council of Trent, arrives in Rome; exhausted by his journey; he dies a fortnight later.
- unknown date – Francisco de Moraes visits Paris for the second time, obtaining inspiration for his Palmerin d'Angleterre.

== New books ==
=== Prose ===
- Andrea Alciato - Opera omnia (first volume)
- Sir John Prise of Brecon (anonymously) – Yn y lhyvyr hwnn (first book printed in Welsh)
- François Rabelais – Le Tiers Livre

=== Drama ===
- Sperone Speroni – Canace (published)

=== Poetry ===
- See 1546 in poetry

== Births ==
- March 27 – Johannes Piscator, German theologian (died 1625)
- May 21 – Madeleine de l'Aubespine, French poet and patron (died 1596)
- October 5 – Cyriakus Schneegass, German Lutheran pastor, composer and music theorist (died 1597)
- unknown dates
  - Philippe Desportes, French poet (died 1606)
  - Pierre de La Primaudaye, French Protestant writer (died 1619)
  - Veronica Franco, Venetian poet and courtesan (died 1591)
  - Daniel Adam z Veleslavína, Czech lexicographer, publisher and writer (died 1599)

== Deaths ==
- February 18 – Martin Luther, German theologian and reformer, 62
- April 7 – Friedrich Myconius, German Lutheran theologian, 55
- August 1 – Peter Faber, French Jesuit theologian, 40
- August 3 – Étienne Dolet, French humanist writer and printer, 37 (executed for heresy)
