= Celio Calcagnini =

Italian humanist and scientist

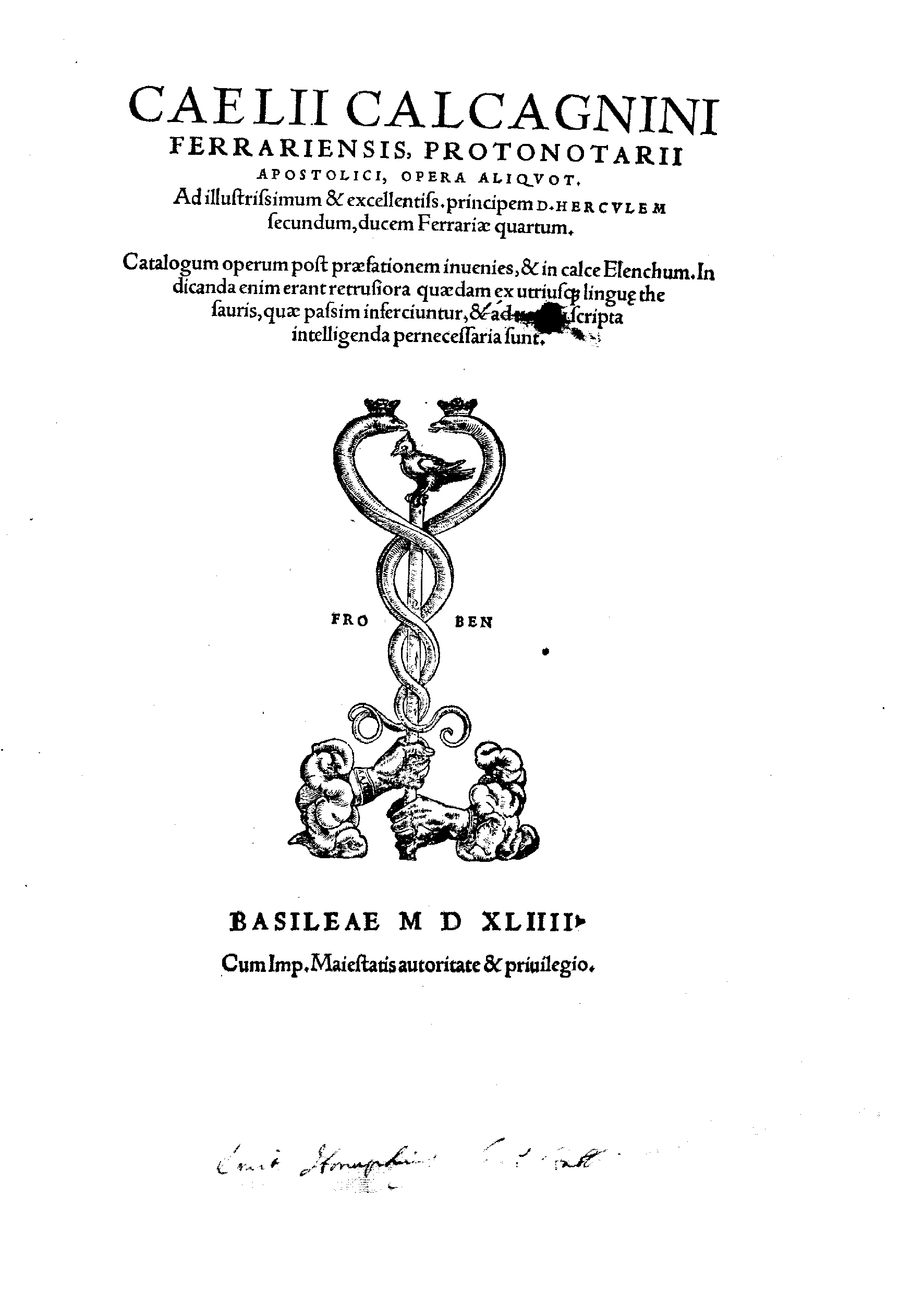
Opere, 1544

Celio Calcagnini (Ferrara, 17 September 1479 – Ferrara, 24 April 1541), also known as Caelius Calcagninus, was an Italian humanist and scientist from Ferrara. His learning as displayed in his collected works is very broad.

== Biography ==
He had a wide experience: as soldier, academic, diplomat and in the chancery of Ippolito d'Este. He was consulted by Richard Croke on behalf of Henry VIII of England in the question of the latter's divorce. He was a major influence on Rabelais's literary and linguistic ideas and is presumed to have met him in Italy, as well as being a teacher of Clément Marot and was praised by Erasmus.

He had a contemporary reputation as an astronomer, and wrote on the rotation of the Earth. He knew Copernicus in Ferrara at the beginning of the sixteenth century. His Quod Caelum Stet, Terra Moveatur is a precursor of the De Revolutionibus of Copernicus, though A. C. Crombie qualifies his rotational theory as "vague", and is often dated to about 1525.

== Works ==
- Opera aliquot (1544)
