= 1544 in poetry =

This article covers 1544 in poetry. Nationality words link to articles with information on the nation's poetry or literature (for instance, Irish or France).

== Works published ==
- Vittoria Colonna, Canzoniere ("Songbook"), lyric poems—mostly sonnets, but also canzoni and capitoli in terza rima, keeping to classical Petrarchan style; the first section refers to her late husband, the second to religion and morals; a fourth edition of her amatory and elegiac poems, including a larger proportion of pious works, published in Venice; Italy
- Bonaventure des Périers, Recueil des Œuvres de feu Bonaventure des Périers, including his poems, published following his suicide, in Lyon, France
- Clément Marot, Œuvres, edition in definitive arrangement, in Lyon, France
- Maurice Scève, Délie, objet de plus haute vertu ("Delia, Object of the Highest Virtue"), lyric poetry, the first French canzoniere of love poems, inspired by the style of Petrarch, the poem dedicated to his young student, Pernette du Guillet; made up of 449 decasyllabic dizains (traditional 10-line strophes) and a prefatory huitain (eight-line strophe); illustrated with 50 emblematic woodcuts; the work for which the author is best known; France

== Births ==
Death years link to the corresponding "[year] in poetry" article:

- March 11 – Torquato Tasso (died 1595), Italian
- Guillaume de Salluste Du Bartas (died 1590), French writer and poet
- George Turberville, also spelled "George Turbervile", born about this year (died c. 1597), English poet and translator
- Also:
  - Giovanni Botero (died 1617), Italian political theorist, priest, poet, and diplomat
  - Dadu Dayal (died 1603), Indian Sant Mat, poet, and philosopher
  - Robert Garnier (died 1590), French poet and playwright
  - Ginés Pérez de Hita born about this year (died 1619), Spanish novelist and poet
  - José de Sigüenza (died 1606), Spanish historian, poet and theologian
  - George Whetstone born about this year (died c. 1587), English playwright, poet and author

== Deaths ==
Birth years link to the corresponding "[year] in poetry" article:

- September 12 – Clément Marot (born 1496), French
- December 9 – Teofilo Folengo (born 1491), Italian
- Antonius Arena, also known as "Antoine Arènes" (born 1500), jurist and poet
- Bonaventure des Périers (born c. 1510), French author and poet (suicide)

== See also ==
- Poetry
- 16th century in poetry
- 16th century in literature
- French Renaissance literature
- Renaissance literature
- Spanish Renaissance literature
