= Antoine Héroet =

French poet

Antoine Héroet, surnamed La Maison-Neuve (died 1568) was a French poet.

== Biography ==
He was born in Paris of a family connected with the well known chancellor François Olivier. His poetry belongs to his early years, for after he had taken orders he ceased to write profane poetry, no doubt because he considered it out of keeping with his calling. He attained the dignity of bishop of Digue.

== Work ==
His chief work is La Parfaicte Amye (Lyons, 1542) in which he developed the idea of a purely spiritual love, based chiefly on the reading of the Italian Neo-Platonists. The book aroused great controversy. La Borderie replied in L'Amie de cour with a description of a very much more human woman, and Charles Fontaine contributed a Contr'amye de court to the dispute.

Héroet, in addition to some translations from the classics, wrote the Complainte d'une dame nouvellement surprise d'amour, an Epistre a François I^{er}, and some pieces included in the now very rare Opuscules d'amour par Héroet, La Borderie et autres divins poetes (Lyons, 1547). Héroet belongs to the Lyonnese school of which Maurice Scève may be regarded as the leader. Clément Marot praises him, and Ronsard was careful to exempt him with one or two others from the scorn he poured on his immediate predecessors.
