= 1551 in poetry =

This article covers 1551 in poetry. Nationality words link to articles with information on the nation's poetry or literature (for instance, Irish or France).

== Works published ==
- Robert Crowley, published anonymously, Philargyrie of Greate Britayne; or, The Fable of the Great Giant
- Marcantonio Flaminio, Carmina Sacra, posthumous, Italy

== Births ==
Death years link to the corresponding "[year] in poetry" article:

- Bhai Gurdas (died 1636), Sikh scholar, poet and the scribe of the Adi Granth
- Siméon-Guillaume de La Roque (died 1611), French
- George Whetstone year uncertain (died 1587), English poet and author

== Deaths ==
Birth years link to the corresponding "[year] in poetry" article:

- Ludovico Pasquali (born 1500), Italian author and poet
- Sin Siamdang (born 1504), Korean painter, poet, embroiderer, calligrapher, scholar of Confucian literature and history

== See also ==
- Poetry
- 16th century in poetry
- 16th century in literature
- Dutch Renaissance and Golden Age literature
- French Renaissance literature
- Renaissance literature
- Spanish Renaissance literature
