= 1540 in poetry =

This article covers 1540 in poetry. Nationality words link to articles with information on the nation's poetry or literature (for instance, Irish or France).

== Events ==
- Klemens Janicki is appointed poeta laureatus by the Pope
- Lazare de Baif travels with Pierre de Ronsard (both eventually French poets) to Alsace, where they meet many northern humanists.

== Works published ==
- Sir Thomas More, Lady Fortune, publication year uncertain
- Girolamo Schola, Capituli di M. Girolamo Schola sopra varii suggetti, publication year uncertain, Italian poems on various subjects, including hats, gypsies, geese, horses, mustard caps and sausages
- Tontada Siddhesavara, Shatsthala Jnanamrita

== Births ==
Death years link to the corresponding "[year] in poetry" article:

- January 26 – Florent Chrestien (died 1596), French satirist and Latin poet
- June 11 – Barnabe Googe (died 1594), English
- Pierre de Bourdeille, seigneur de Brantôme, born about this year (died 1614), French soldier, historian, biographer and poet
- Francisco de Terrazas, born about this year (died c. 1600), Mexican
- Rhys Cain (died 1614), Welsh language poet
- Frei Agostinho da Cruz (died 1619), brother of Diogo Bernardes, Portuguese
- Mathias Holtzwart born about this year (died sometime after 1589), German
- Jacob Regnart born sometime from this year to 1545 (died 1599), Flemish composer

== Deaths ==
Birth years link to the corresponding "[year] in poetry" article:

- October 5 – Helius Eobanus Hessus (born 1488, German, Latin poet

== See also ==
- Poetry
- 16th century in poetry
- 16th century in literature
- Dutch Renaissance and Golden Age literature
- French Renaissance literature
- Renaissance literature
- Spanish Renaissance literature
