= 1538 in poetry =

This article covers 1538 in poetry. Nationality words link to articles with information on the nation's poetry or literature (for instance, Irish or France).

== Works published ==
=== Great Britain ===
- Anonymous, The Court of Venus (see also The Courte of Venus 1563, a revised edition)
- Sir David Lindsay, The Complaynte and Testament of a Popinjay

=== Other languages ===
- Francesco Berni (primarily) and other poets, Rime Burlesche, Venice, published posthumously, Italy
- Vittoria Colonna, an edition of her amatory and elegiac poems, published in Parma in 1538; a third edition, containing sixteen of her Rime Spirituali, in which religious themes are treated in Italian, was published at Florence soon afterwards; Italy
- Clément Marot Œuvres de Clément Marot published in Lyon; France

== Births ==
Death years link to the corresponding "[year] in poetry" article:

- June 30 – Bonaventura Vulcanius (died 1614), Dutch humanist scholar and poet
- December 10 – Giovanni Battista Guarini (died 1612), Italian poet, dramatist, and diplomat
- Also:
  - Alexander Arbuthnot (died 1583), Scottish ecclesiastic poet and clergyman whose extant poetry consists of three poems: The Praises of Wemen (4 lines), On Luve (10 lines), and The Miseries of a Pure [poor] Scholar (189 lines)
  - Sir Thomas Craig (died 1608), Scottish jurist and poet
  - Amadis Jamyn (died 1593), French
  - Jacques Grévin (died 1570), French playwright, poet and physician
  - Pablo de Céspedes (died 1608), Spanish painter, poet and architect
  - Shah Hussain (died 1599), Punjabi Sufi poet and Sufi saint; born in Lahore (modern-day Pakistan); considered a pioneer of the kafi form of Punjabi poetry

== Deaths ==
Birth years link to the corresponding "[year] in poetry" article:

- date not known – Pierre Gringore (born 1475), French poet and playwright

== See also ==
- Poetry
- 16th century in poetry
- 16th century in literature
- French Renaissance literature
- Renaissance literature
- Spanish Renaissance literature
