= 1539 in poetry =

This article covers 1539 in poetry. Nationality words link to articles with information on the nation's poetry or literature (for instance, Irish or France).

== Births ==
Death years link to the corresponding "[year] in poetry" article:

- February 23 – Salima Sultan Begum (Makhfi) (died 1613), Mughal empress consort and Urdu poet
- November – Jacques Grévin born about this year (died 1570), French playwright and poet
- Paulus Schede Melissus (died 1602), German poet

== Deaths ==
Birth years link to the corresponding "[year] in poetry" article:

== See also ==
- Poetry
- 16th century in poetry
- 16th century in literature
- French Renaissance literature
- Renaissance literature
- Spanish Renaissance literature
