= Polish poetry =

Polish poetry has a centuries-old history, similar to the Polish literature.

== Prominent Polish poets include ==
- Marcin Bielski (1495–1575); Polish historian, chronicler, writer and Renaissance satirical poet, first to use Polish, hence his designation as the father of Polish prose
- Mikołaj Rej (1505–1569); first Polish author to write exclusively in Polish and described as a "father of Polish literature"
- Jan Kochanowski (1530–1584); commonly regarded as the greatest Polish poet before Adam Mickiewicz
- Joachim Bielski (1540–1599); royal secretary, poet and historian. He wrote in Polish and Latin. Son of Marcin Bielski.
- Adam Mickiewicz (1798–1855); regarded as one of the Three Bards of Polish Romantic literature and a "national poet" in Poland, Lithuania and Belarus
- Juliusz Słowacki (1809–1849); regarded as one of the Three Bards of Polish Romantic literature
- Zygmunt Krasiński (1812–1859); regarded as one of the Three Bards of Polish Romantic literature
- Cyprian Norwid (1821–1883); regarded as a "national poet" in Poland
- Maria Konopnicka (1842–1910)
- Antoni Lange (1863–1929)
- Adam Asnyk (1838–1897)
- Bolesław Leśmian (1877–1937)
- Jan Lechoń (1899–1956)
- Julian Tuwim (1894–1953)
- Maria Pawlikowska-Jasnorzewska (1891–1945)
- Jarosław Iwaszkiewicz (1894–1980)
- Czesław Miłosz (1911–2004); Nike Award (1998), Nobel Prize in Literature (1980), Neustadt International Prize for Literature (1978).
- Wisława Szymborska (1923–2012); Goethe Prize (1991), Herder Prize (1995), Nobel Prize in Literature (1996), Order of the White Eagle (2011).
- Zbigniew Herbert (1924–1998)
- Julia Hartwig (1921–2017)
- Adam Zagajewski (1945–2021)
- Urszula Kozioł (1931–2025); Nike Award (2024)

== See also ==
- List of famous Polish poems
- List of Polish-language poets
- Sapphic stanza in Polish poetry
- Skamander
- Sung poetry
