= Renaissance literature =

European literature influenced by the Renaissance

Renaissance literature refers to European literature which was influenced by the intellectual and cultural tendencies associated with the Renaissance. The literature of the Renaissance was written within the general movement of the Renaissance, which arose in 14th-century Italy and continued until the mid-17th century in England while being diffused into the rest of the western world. It is characterized by the adoption of a humanist philosophy and the recovery of the classical Antiquity. It benefited from the spread of printing in the latter part of the 15th century.

== Overview ==
For the writers of the Renaissance, Greek-Roman inspiration was shown both in the themes of their writing and in the literary forms they used. The world was considered from an anthropocentric perspective. Platonic ideas were revived and put to the service of Christianity. The search for pleasures of the senses and a critical and rational spirit completed the ideological panorama of the period. New literary genres such as the essay (Montaigne) and new metrical forms such as the Spenserian stanza made their appearance.

The impact of the Renaissance varied across the continent; countries that were predominantly Catholic or Protestant experienced the Renaissance differently. Areas where the Eastern Orthodox Church was culturally dominant, as well as those areas of Europe under Islamic rule, were more or less outside its influence. The period focused on self-actualization and one's ability to accept what is going on in one's life.

The earliest Renaissance literature appeared in Italy in the 14th century; Petrarch, Machiavelli, and Ariosto are notable examples of Italian Renaissance writers. From Italy, the influence of the Renaissance spread at different times to other countries and continued to spread around Europe through the 17th century. The English Renaissance and the Renaissance in Scotland date from the late 15th century to the early 17th century. In northern Europe, the scholarly writings of Erasmus, the plays of William Shakespeare, the poems of Edmund Spenser, and the writings of Sir Philip Sidney may be considered Renaissance in character.

The development of the printing press (using movable type) by Johannes Gutenberg in the 1440s encouraged authors to write in their local vernacular instead of Greek or Latin classical languages, thus widening the reading audience and promoting the spread of Renaissance ideas.

== Major authors ==
Significant writers and poets associated with the Renaissance literature are:

Italian: Petrarch, Giovanni Boccaccio, Jacopo Sannazaro, Niccolò Machiavelli, Bernardo Dovizi, Ludovico Ariosto, Michelangelo

Hungarian: Janus Pannonius, Bálint Balassi

Portuguese: Jorge de Montemor, Luís de Camões

Spanish: Baptista Mantuanus, Miguel de Cervantes, John of the Cross, Garcilaso de la Vega, Juan Boscán Almogáver, Fernando de Rojas

Serbian: Konstantin Mihailović, Martin Segon

French: François Rabelais, Marguerite de Navarre, Clément Marot, Bonaventure des Périers

German: Sebastian Brant, Conrad Celtes, Thomas Murner, Ulrich von Hutten, Hans Sachs, Friedrich Dedekind, Johann Fischart, Georg Rudolf Weckherlin

Dutch: Erasmus

English: Thomas Wyatt, Edmund Spenser, Philip Sidney, William Shakespeare

Scottish: Walter Kennedy, Robert Henryson, William Dunbar, Gavin Douglas, David Lyndsay, Iseabail Ní Mheic Cailéin, George Buchanan, Alexander Scott, Alexander Montgomerie, James VI, Elizabeth Melville, William Drummond of Hawthornden

Polish: Mikołaj Rej, Klemens Janicki, Jan Kochanowski

== See also ==
- Allegory in Renaissance literature
- British Renaissance literature
  - Elizabethan literature
  - English Renaissance theatre
- Renaissance in Croatia
- Dutch Renaissance and Golden Age literature
- French Renaissance literature
- German Renaissance and Reformation literature
- Italian Renaissance literature
- Polish Renaissance literature
- Portuguese Renaissance and Portuguese Renaissance literature
- Scottish Renaissance literature
- Spanish Renaissance literature
- Swedish Renaissance literature

=== Literature by century ===
- 15th century in literature
- 16th century in literature

=== Poetry by century ===
- 15th century in poetry
- 16th century in poetry
