= Madeleine Des Roches =

French writer

Madeleine Des Roches (née Madeleine Neveu) (c. 1520 – November 1587) was a French writer of the Renaissance. She was the mother of Catherine Fradonnet, called Catherine Des Roches (December 1542 - November 1587), to whom she taught poetry, literature and ancient languages. She is a writer in the tradition of Christine de Pizan and others, working to establish a community of women writers.

== Biography ==
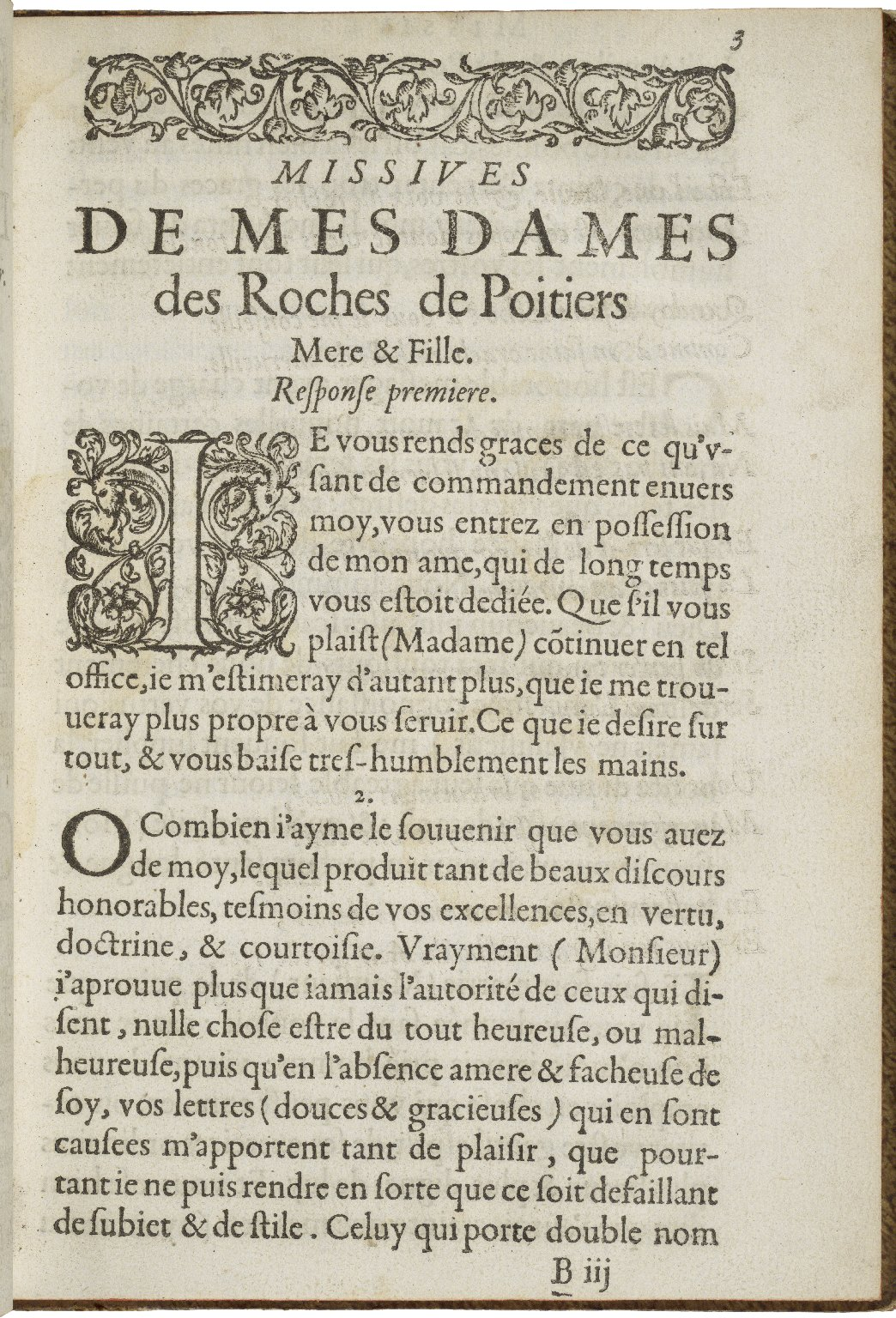
The first page of Des Roches' Les missiues de Mes-Dames Des Roches de Poitiers mere et fille.

Madeleine Neveu married André Fradonnet, seigneur Des Roches, the procurer of Poitiers around 1539. In a second marriage (c. 1550), Madeleine Des Roches wed the lawyer François Eboissard, seigneur de la Villée.

Contemporaries of Pierre de Ronsard, and friends of the humanist Estienne Pasquier, Madeleine Des Roches and her daughter were the center of a literary circle based in Poitiers between 1570 and 1587, and which included the poets Scévole de Sainte-Marthe, Barnabé Brisson, René Chopin, Antoine Loisel, Claude Binet, Nicolas Rapin and Odet de Turnèbe. The circle is best known for a collection of gallant verse (in French, Italian, Latin and Greek) entitled La Puce de Madame Des Roches ("The Flea of Madame Des Roches", published 1583) in which the poets, inspired by an original poem by Pasquier, wrote on the theme of a flea upon Catherine's throat. Des Roches is now seen as an important successor of the literary legacy of Christine de Pizan, arguing as de Pizan did for the necessity of a "City of Ladies", a literary community of women.

Both she and her daughter died of an epidemic on the same day.

The combined output of mother and daughter—which was published collectively—comprise epistles, odes, sonnets, stanzas, epitaphs, and a few dialogues in prose and verse. In her writings, Madeleine Des Roches spoke of how her domestic activities hindered her from investing as much time as she would have wished into her literary activities. Her poems reveal a large erudition and associate knowledge with virtue.

== Works ==
Original editions:

- Oeuvres, Paris: Abel L'Angelier, 1578–9.
- Secondes Oeuvres, Poitiers: Nicolas Courtoys, 1583.
- Les missives de Mesdames des Roches... (in prose and verse), Paris: Abel L'Angelier, 1586.

Related works:

- La Puce de Madame Des Roches, 1583.

Modern editions:

- (in French) Les missives de Mesdames Des Roches de Poitiers mère et fille, Anne R. Larsen, editor, Geneva: Droz, 1999.
- (in French) Les secondes œuvres de Mesdames Des Roches de Poitiers mere et fille, Anne R. Larsen editor, Geneva: Droz, 1998.
- (in French) Les œuvres de Mesdames Des Roches de Poitiers mere et fille, Anne R. Larsen editor, Geneva: Droz, 1993.

== See also ==
Two other French Renaissance literary circles:

- La Pléiade - the literary circle around Ronsard
- Maurice Scève - leader of a literary circle based in Lyon
