= Gillot =

Gillot or Gillott (French pronunciation: [ʒilo]) is a French surname. It may refer to:

== Gillot ==
- Claude Gillot (1673–1722), French painter
- Dominique Gillot (born 1949), French politician
- Firmin Gillot (c. 19th century), French inventor and photoengraver
- Francis Gillot (born 1960), French footballer and manager
- François-Xavier Gillot (1842–1910), French physician, mycologist, and botanist
- Jacques Gillot (born 1948), Guadeloupean politician
- Jacques Gillot (jurist) (c. 1550–1619), French priest and jurist
- Marie-Agnès Gillot (born 1974 or 1975), Parisian ballet dancer and choreographer

== Gillott ==
- Eric Gillott (born 1951), New Zealand cricketer
- Jacky Gillott (1939–1980), English novelist and broadcaster
- Joseph Gillott (1799–1873), English pen-maker and art patron
- Peter Gillott (1935–2021), English footballer
- Samuel Gillott (1838–1913), Australian lawyer and politician

== See also ==
- Gillott's, English manufacturing company founded by Joseph Gillott
- Gillotts School, a secondary school in Oxfordshire, U.K.
