= Jacques Gillot (jurist) =

Jacques Gillot (1550? – 1619) was a French priest and jurist, and reputed author, a Gallican opponent of the Society of Jesus.

Gillot was a councillor-clerk of the Parlement of Paris, and also a canon of the Sainte-Chapelle. He was notorious for associating with freethinkers; the Queen called him "the Lutheran priest". He was also Dean of Langres Cathedral.

One work where Gillot's part is attested is Satyre Ménippée de la vertu du catholicon d'Espagne et de la tenue des éstats de Paris (1599) Gillot was a reputed collaborator in the Satire Ménippée. The other authors are given as: Pierre Leroy (a canon of Rouen), Pierre Pithou, Nicolas Rapin, Florent Chretien, and Jean Passerat.

The Vita Calvini of Jean Papire Masson was often incorrectly attributed to Gillot in the 17th century. The Traictez des droicts et libertez de L'Eglise gallicane (1609) is traditionally attributed to Gillot, but on unclear grounds.

Gillot was a correspondent of Paolo Sarpi, and was one of the anti-Jesuit circle that circulated the unlikely story of Pierre Coton and the questions he had supposedly prepared to ask an exorcised spirit. Others in his correspondence network were Isaac Casaubon and Joseph Scaliger.
