= Psalm 137 =

Psalm

- "By the rivers of Babylon, there we sat down"
- Communal lament
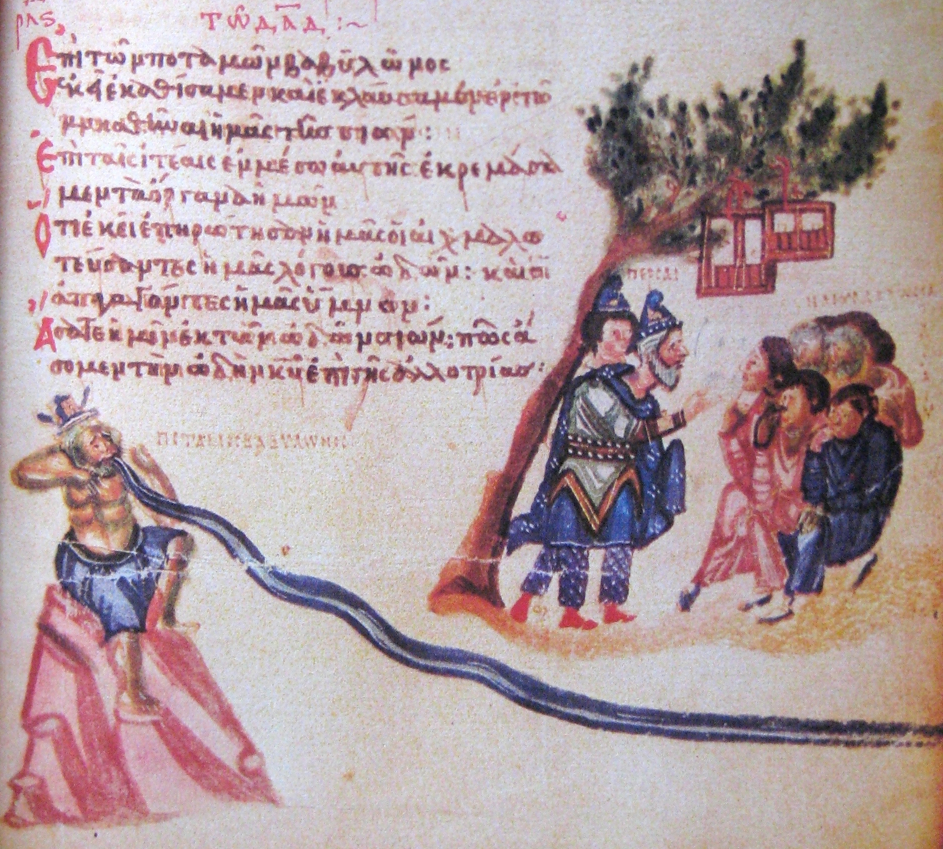
- Psalm 137 from Chludov Psalter (9th century)
- Other name: Psalm 136; "Super flumina Babylonis"
- Language: Hebrew (original)

Psalm 137
- ← Psalm 136 Psalm 138 →
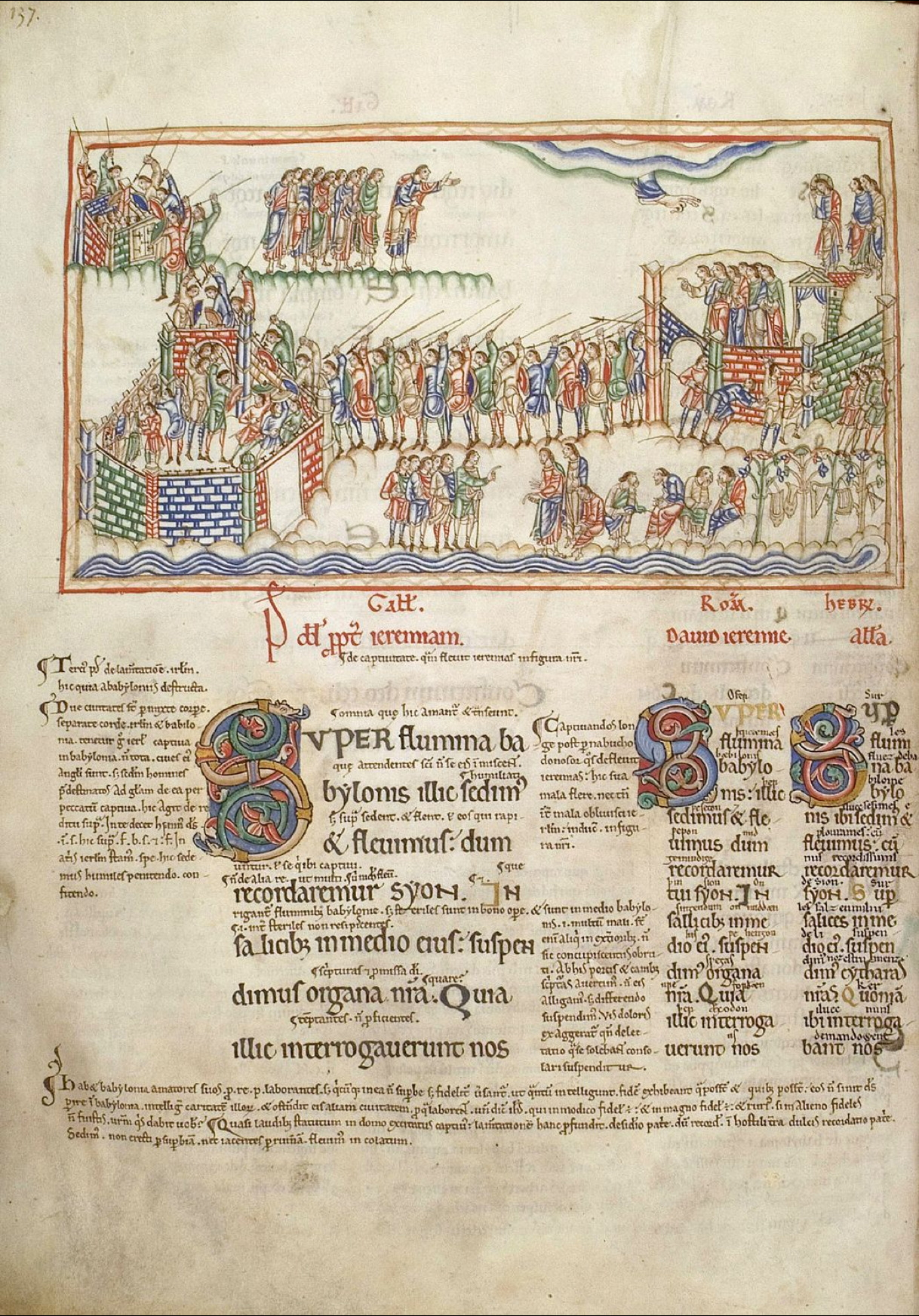
- Psalm 137 in the Eadwine Psalter (12th century)
- Book: Book of Psalms
- Hebrew Bible part: Ketuvim
- Order in the Hebrew part: 1
- Category: Sifrei Emet
- Christian Bible part: Old Testament
- Order in the Christian part: 19

Psalm 137 is the 137th psalm of the Book of Psalms, beginning in English in the King James Version: "By the rivers of Babylon, there we sat down". The Book of Psalms is part of the third section of the Hebrew Bible, and a book of the Christian Old Testament. In the slightly different numbering system used in the Greek Septuagint and Latin Vulgate translations of the Bible, this psalm is Psalm 136. In Latin, it is known by the incipit, "Super flumina Babylonis". The psalm is a communal lament about remembering Zion, and yearning for Jerusalem while dwelling in exile during the Babylonian captivity, which ends with a call for revenge against Babylon's descendants equal to that perpetrated by Babylon (a phrasing commonly misconstrued for a range of purposes).

The psalm forms a regular part of liturgy in Jewish, Eastern Orthodox, Catholic, Lutheran, Anglican and other Protestant traditions. It has often been set to music and paraphrased in hymns, though the violent final verses are often omitted.

== Context and content ==
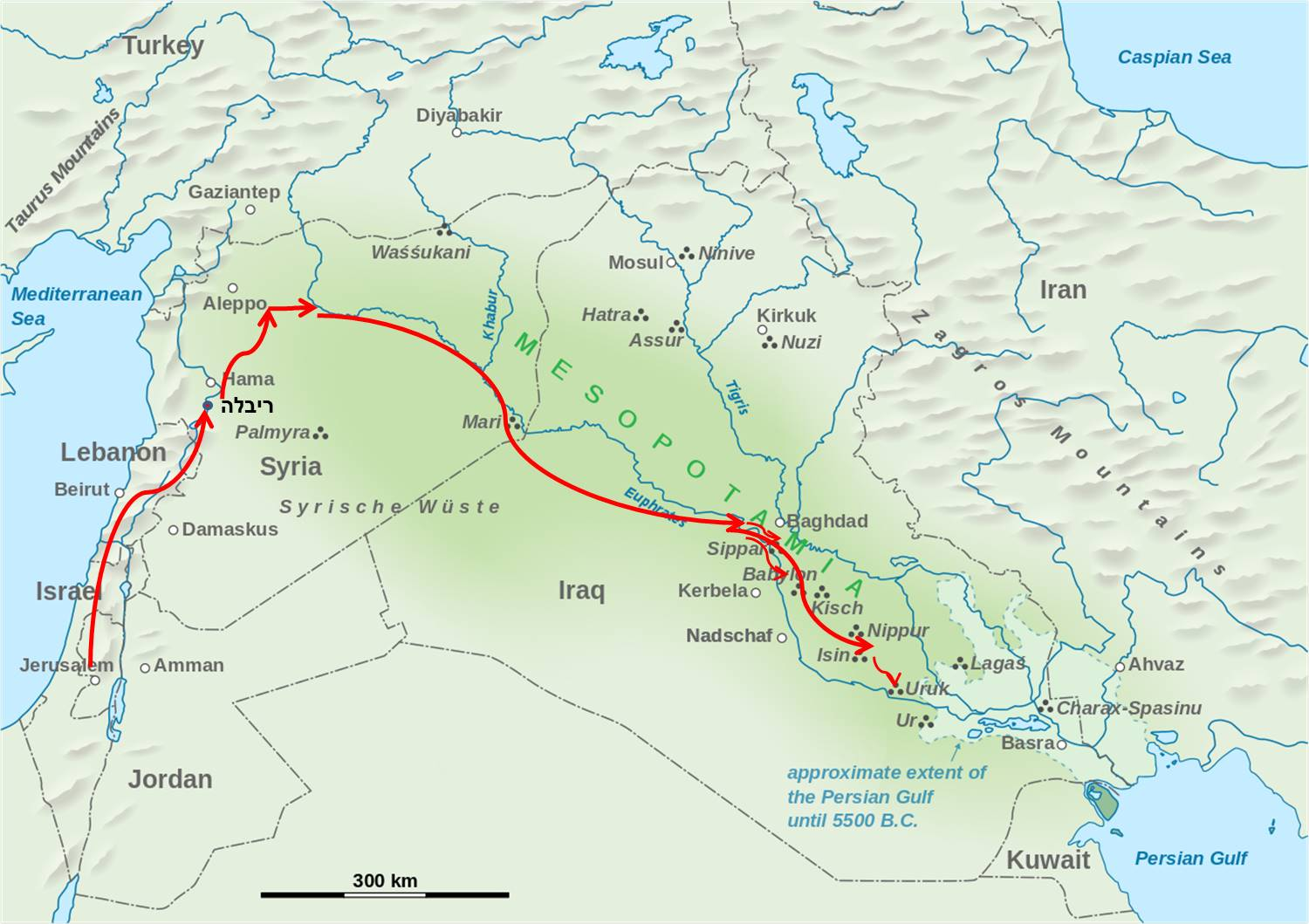
The journey of the Judean exiles to Babylon in the first decades of the 6th century BC.

After Nebuchadnezzar II's successful siege of Jerusalem in 597 BC, and subsequent campaigns, inhabitants of the Kingdom of Judah were deported to Babylonia, where they were held captive until some time after the Fall of Babylon (539 BC). The rivers of Babylon are the Euphrates river, its tributaries, and the Tigris river.

Psalm 137 is a hymn expressing the yearnings of the Jewish people during their Babylonian exile. In its whole form of nine verses, the psalm reflects the yearning for Jerusalem as well as hatred for the Holy City's enemies with sometimes violent imagery.

Rabbinical sources attributed the poem to the prophet Jeremiah, and the Septuagint version of the psalm bears the superscription: "For David. By Jeremias, in the Captivity."

=== Verses 1–4 ===
The early lines of the psalm describe the sadness of the Israelites in exile, while remembering their homeland, weeping and hanging their harps on trees. Asked to "sing the Lord's song in a strange land", they refuse.

| 1. | By the rivers of Babylon, there we sat down, yea, we wept, when we remembered Zion. |
| 2. | We hanged our harps upon the willows in the midst thereof. |
| 3. | For there they that carried us away captive required of us a song; and they that wasted us required of us mirth, saying, Sing us one of the songs of Zion. |
| 4. | How shall we sing the Lord's song in a strange land? |

Methodist writer Joseph Benson reflects on the "inexpressible pathos ... in these few words! How do they, at once, transport us to Babylon, and place before our eyes the mournful situation of the Israelitish captives! Driven from their native country, stripped of every comfort and convenience, in a strange land among idolaters, wearied and broken-hearted, they sit in silence by those hostile waters." He argues that the reference to harps reflects "all instruments of music" and that the words can probably be interpreted to mean that the singers were Levites used to the performance of music in the service of the temple.

=== Verses 5–6 ===
In verses 5–6 the speaker turns into self-exhortation to remember Jerusalem:

| 5. | If I forget thee, O Jerusalem, let my right hand forget [her cunning]. |
| 6. | If I do not remember thee, let my tongue cleave to the roof of my mouth; if I prefer not Jerusalem above my chief joy. |

=== Verses 7–9 ===
The psalm ends with prophetic predictions of violent revenge.

| 7. | Remember, O Lord, the children of Edom in the day of Jerusalem; who said, Rase it, rase it, even to the foundation thereof. |
| 8. | O daughter of Babylon, who art to be destroyed; happy shall he be, that rewardeth thee as thou hast served us. |
| 9. | Happy shall he be, that taketh and dasheth thy little ones against the stones. |

== Liturgical uses ==
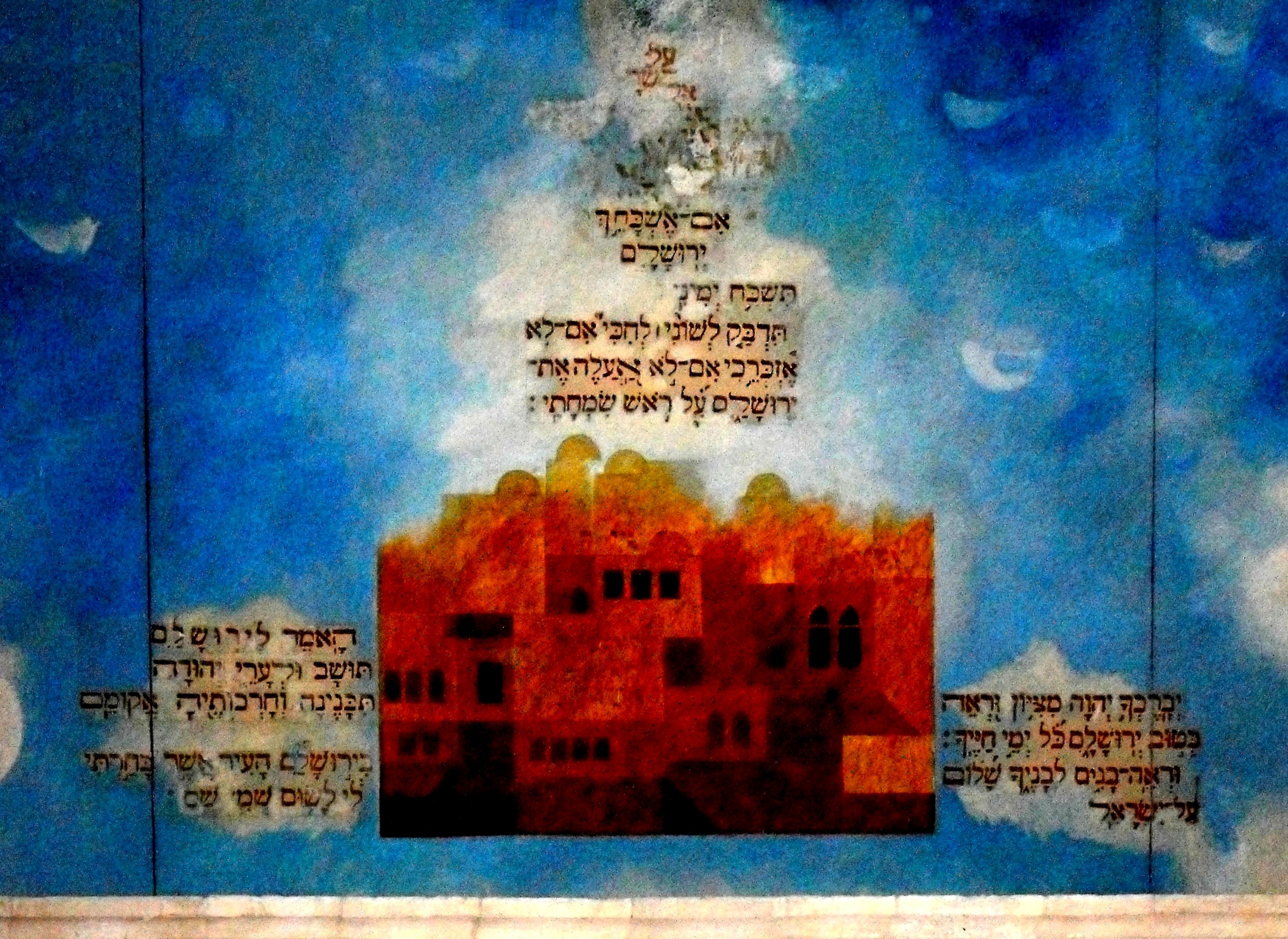
Yochanan ben Zakai Synagogue Wall Painting

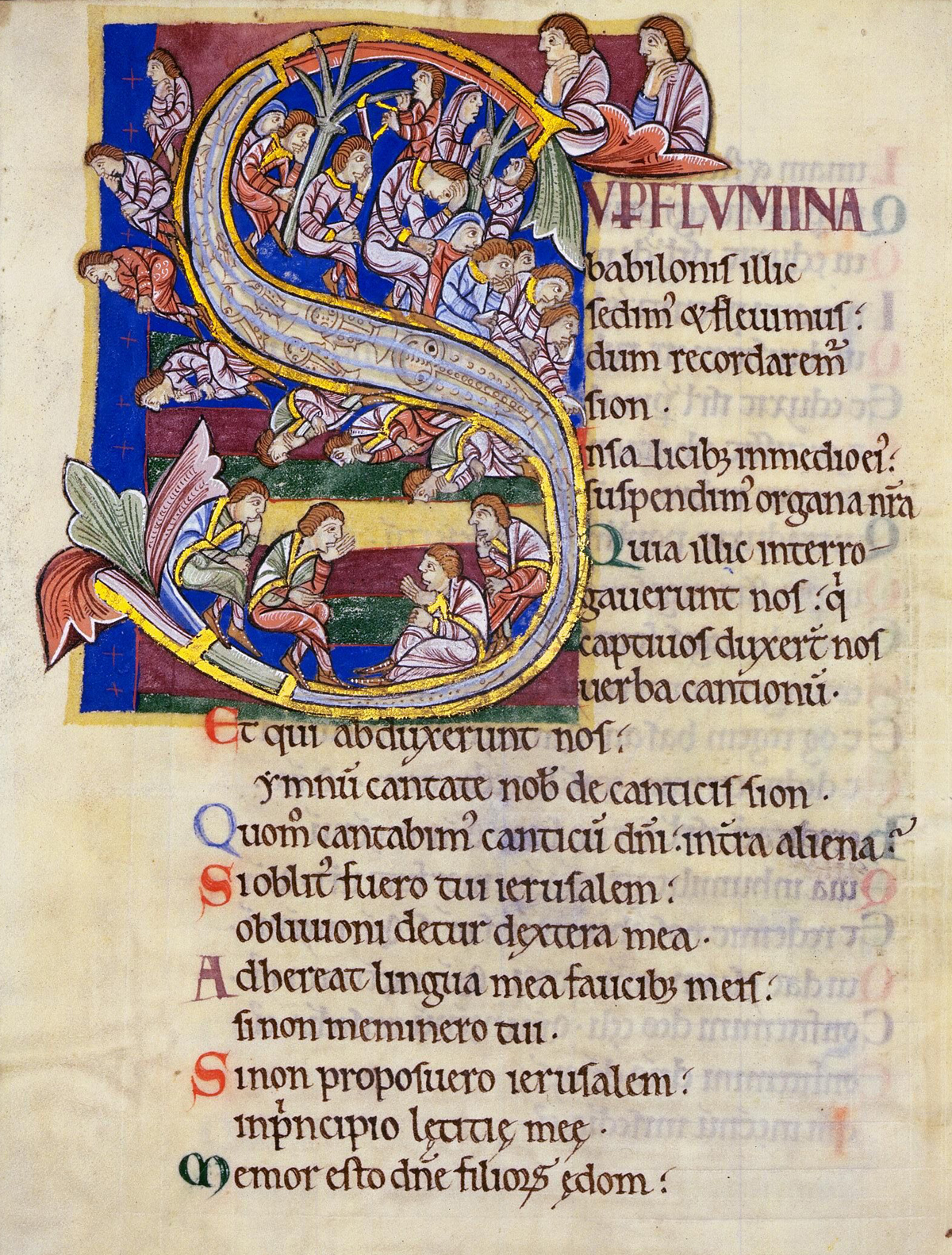
Psalm 137 (136) in the St. Albans Psalter, 12th century

=== Judaism ===
The psalm is customarily recited before Tisha B'Av, commemorating the destruction of the Temples in Jerusalem, and by some during the Nine Days preceding Tisha B'Av.

Psalm 137 is traditionally recited before the Birkat Hamazon (Grace After Meals) on a weekday. However, on Shabbat and Jewish holidays, and at the celebratory meal accompanying a Jewish wedding, brit milah, or pidyon haben, Psalm 126 is recited before the Birkat Hamazon instead.

Verses 5 and 6 are customarily recited during a Jewish wedding ceremony shortly before breaking a glass as a symbolic act of mourning over the destruction of the Temple. Verse 7 is found in the repetition of the Amidah on Rosh Hashanah.

Psalm 137 is one of the ten Psalms of the Tikkun HaKlali of Rebbe Nachman of Breslov.

=== Eastern Orthodox Church ===
In the Eastern Orthodox Church, Psalm 136 (Psalm 137 in the Masoretic Text) is part of the nineteenth Kathisma division of the Psalter, read at Matins on Friday mornings, and on Wednesdays and Fridays during Lent, at Matins and the Third Hour, respectively.

It is also chanted solemnly at Matins on the last 1 to 3 Sundays before Lent (depending on the local custom), with the refrain, Alleluia.

=== Coptic Orthodox Church ===
In the Agpeya, the Coptic Church's book of hours, this psalm is prayed in the office of Compline and the third watch of the Midnight office. It is also in the prayer of the Veil, which is generally prayed only by monks.

=== Western Christianity ===
In following the Rule of Saint Benedict (530 AD), the Catholic Church had Super flumina Babylonis set in the Roman Breviary for Vespers on Wednesdays. In the Roman Missal of 1962, the first verse of was the Offertory for the Mass on the 20th Sunday after Pentecost.

After the Second Vatican Council, the last three verses of the psalm were deleted from liturgical books because their contents were seen as incompatible with the 'Gospel message'. In the three-year cycle of texts for the Mass of Paul VI, promulgated in 1970 and called the Ordinary Form, this psalm is read on Laetare Sunday (that is the Fourth Sunday in Lent) of Year B.

As with the reforms in the Catholic Church, the 1962 Book of Common Prayer used by the Anglican Church of Canada has also removed the last three verses.

In Lutheranism, a well-known hymn based on the psalm has been associated with a Gospel reading in which Jesus foretells and mourns the Destruction of Jerusalem (Luke 19:41–48).

== Translations, versifications and settings ==
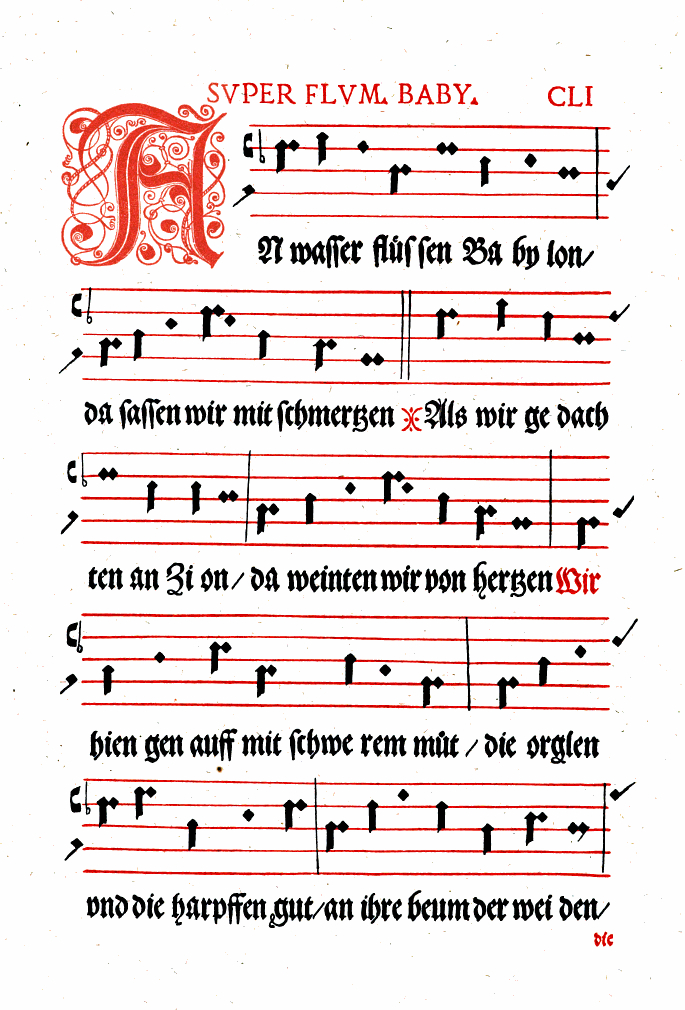
Dachstein's "An Wasserflüssen Babylon" in a 1541 edition of the Straßburger Gesangbuch (Strasbourg Hymnal)

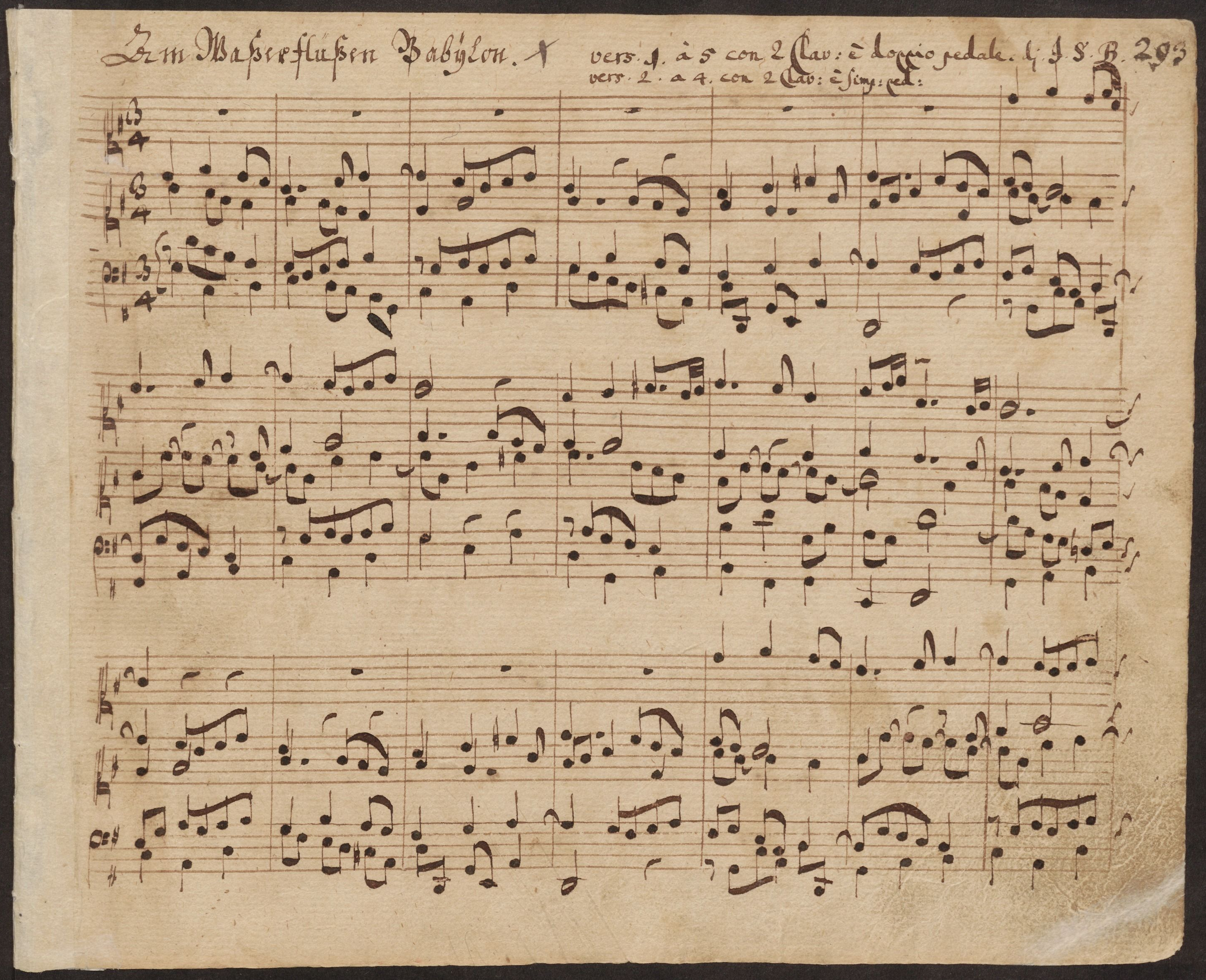
Early version of Bach's An Wasserflüssen Babylon chorale prelude, BWV 653

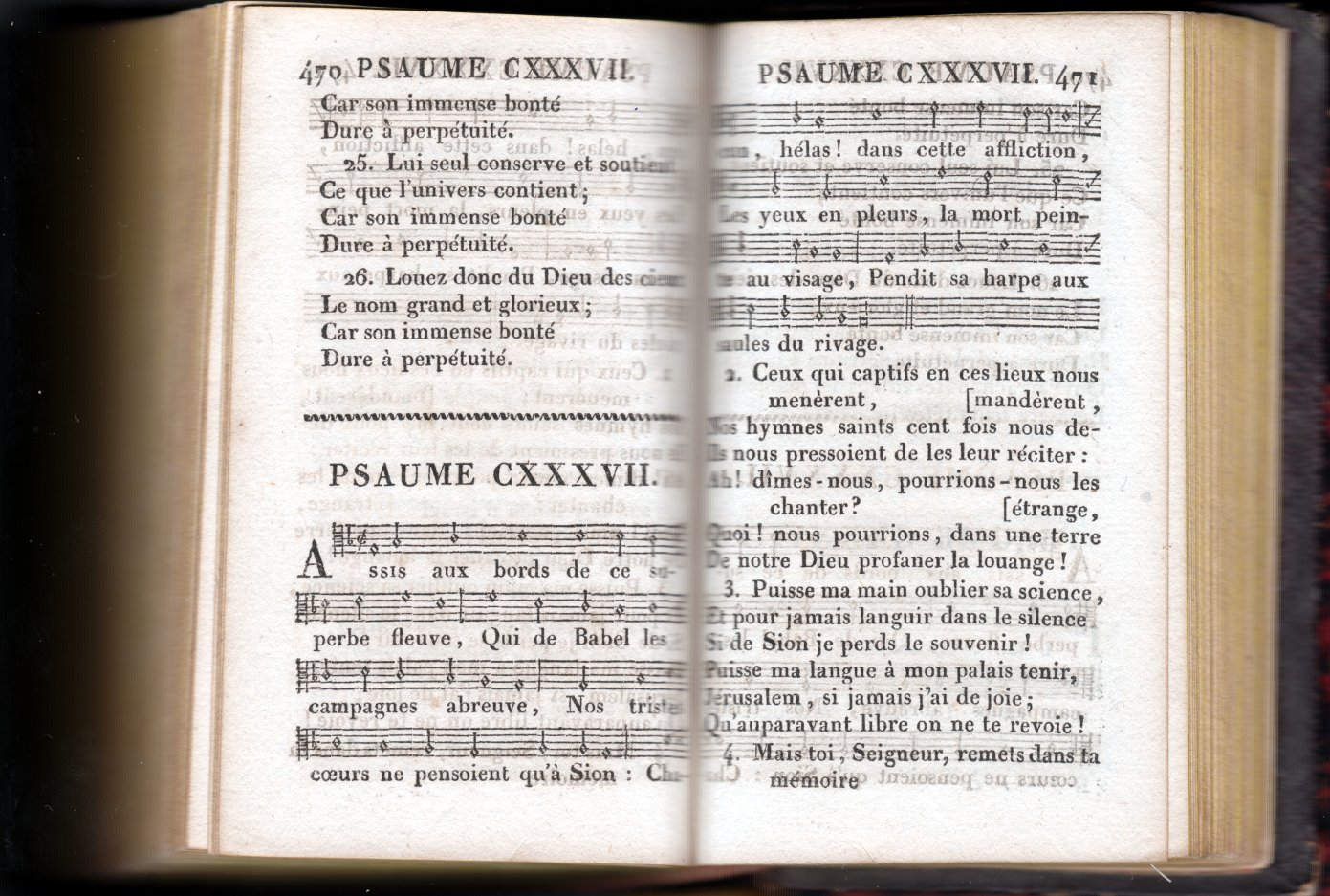
Psalm 137 set to music in a French Protestant psalm book of 1817

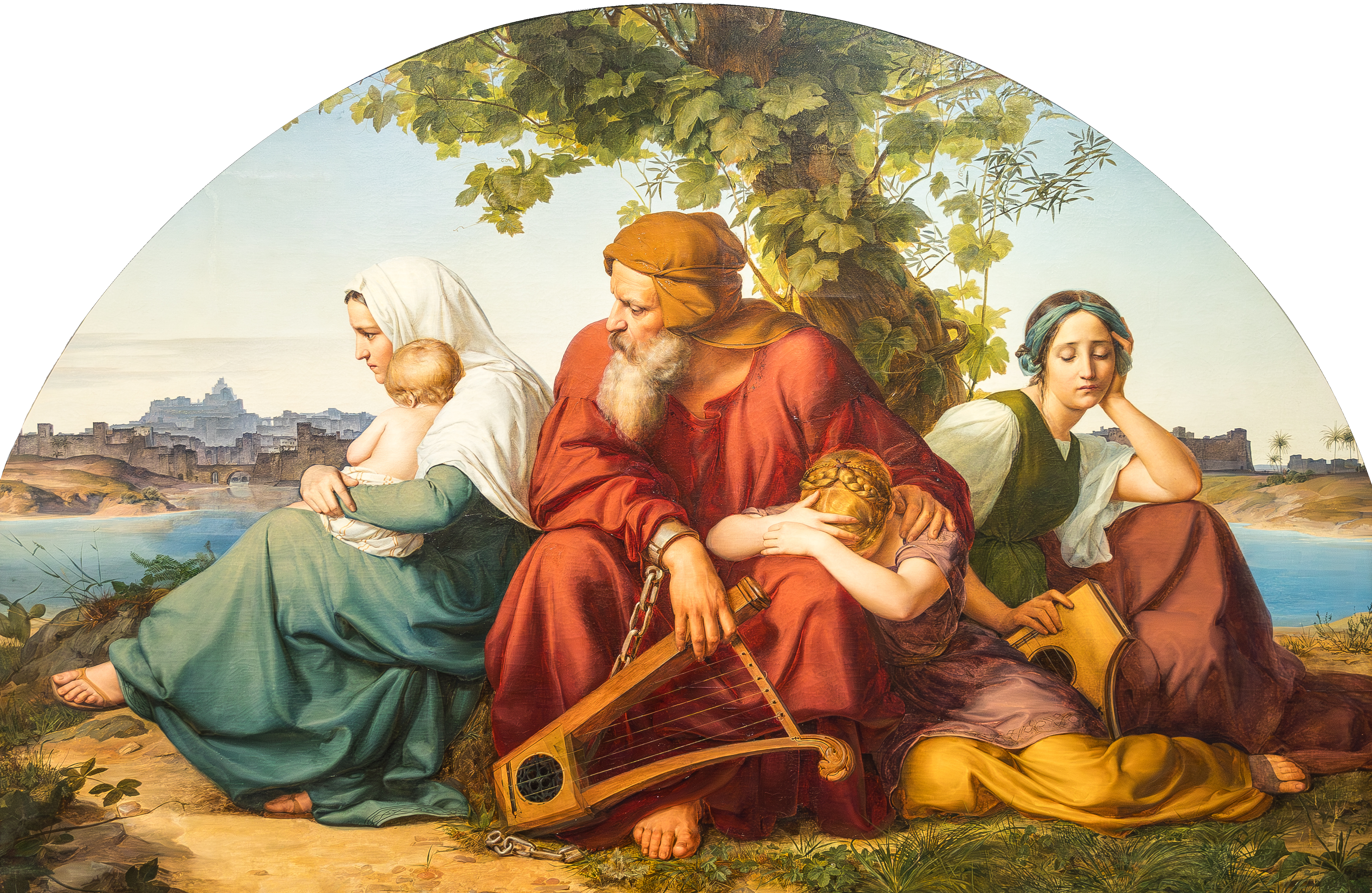
By the rivers of Babylon, painting by Eduard Bendemann, c. 1832

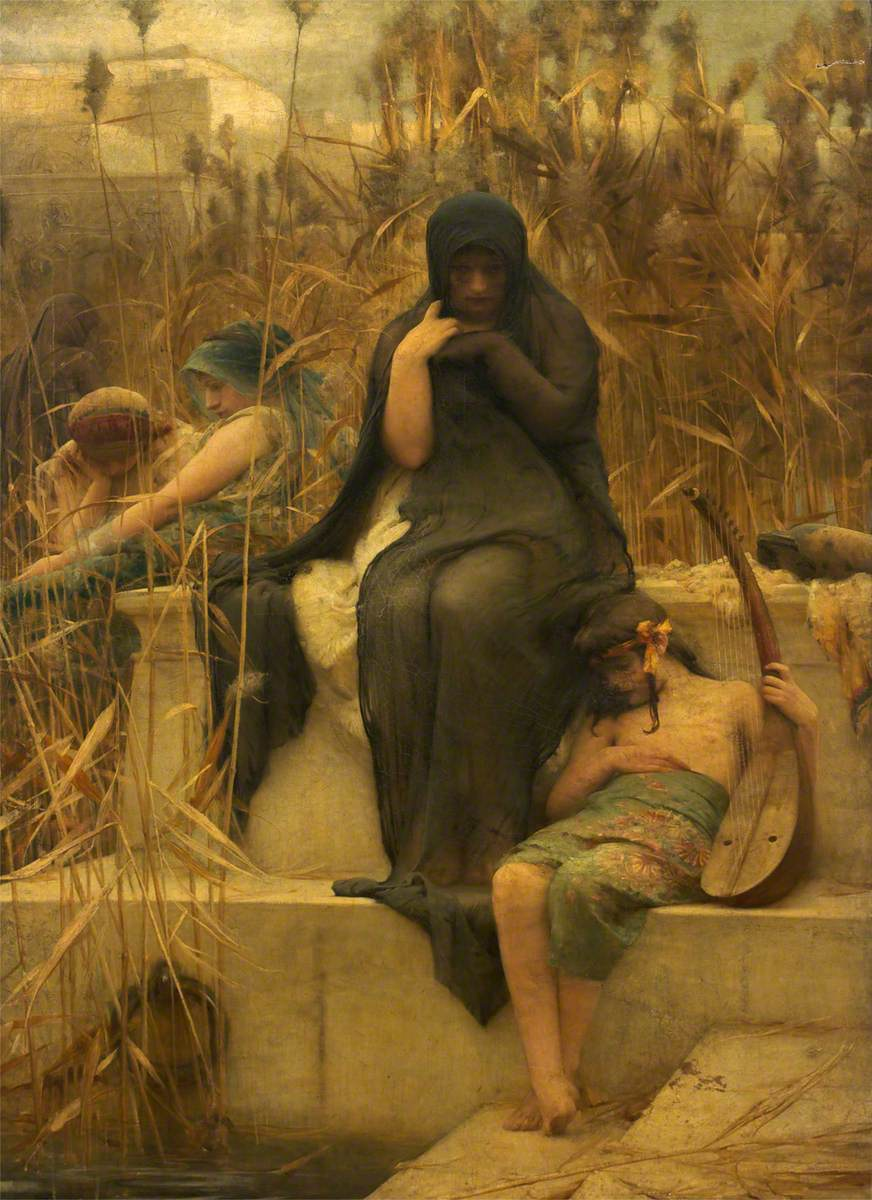
By the Waters of Babylon, painting by Arthur Hacker, c. 1888

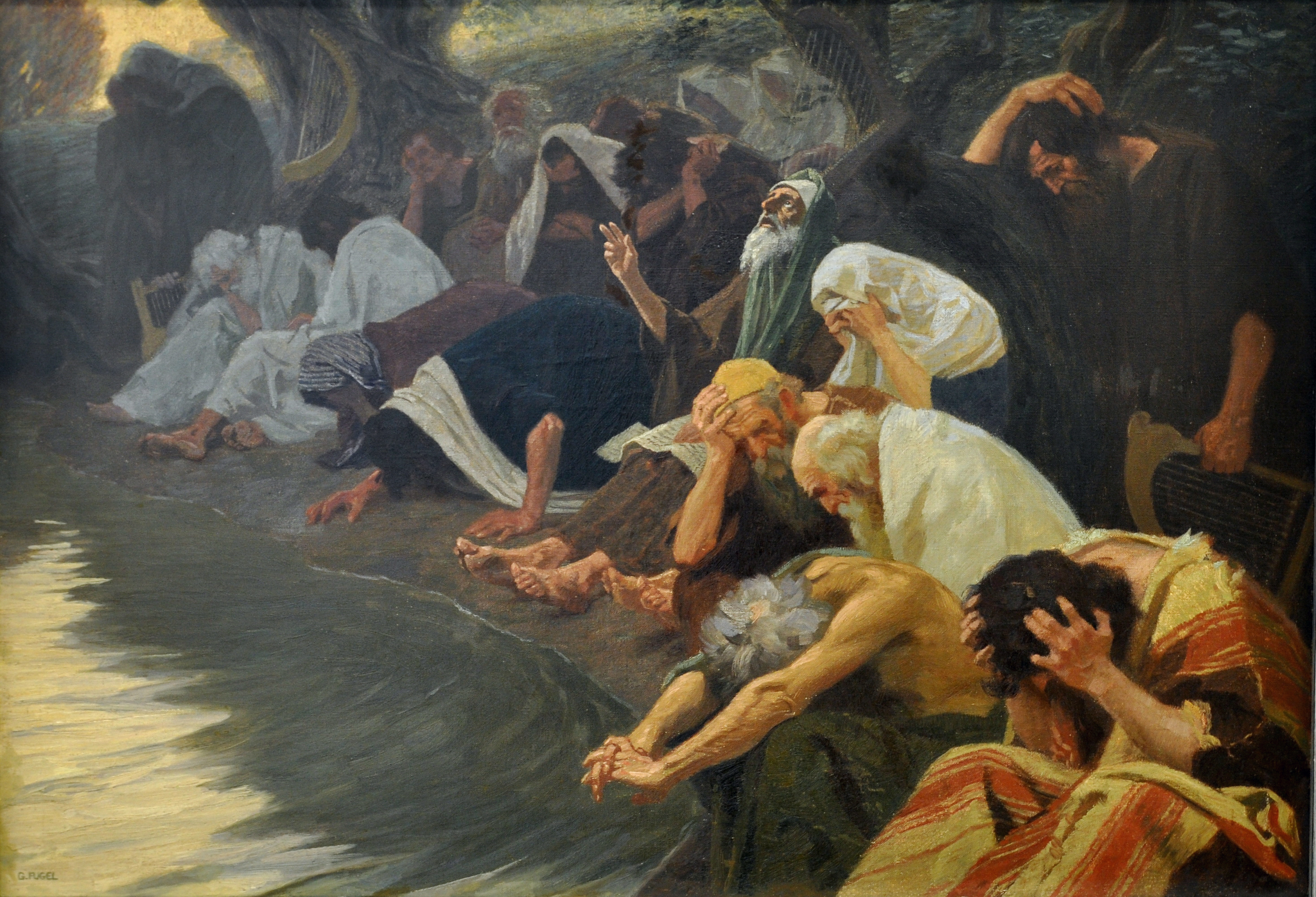
By the rivers of Babylon, painting by Gebhard Fugel, c. 1920

The psalm has been set to music by many composers. Many settings omit the last verse. The hymnwriter John L. Bell comments alongside his own setting of this Psalm: "The final verse is omitted in this metricization, because its seemingly outrageous curse is better dealt with in preaching or group conversation. It should not be forgotten, especially by those who have never known exile, dispossession or the rape of people and land."

=== 16th to 18th centuries ===
Latin settings ("Super flumina Babylonis") as four-part motets were composed by Costanzo Festa, Nicolas Gombert, Giovanni Pierluigi da Palestrina and Orlando di Lasso. Philippe de Monte and Tomás Luis de Victoria set the text for eight parts. French Baroque settings were written by Henry Dumont, Marc-Antoine Charpentier, 2 settings, H.170 (1670) and H.171-H.171 a (? late 1670), Charles-Hubert Gervais (1723), Michel-Richard Delalande S.13 (1686). and François Giroust (1768).

Wolfgang Dachstein's "An Wasserflüssen Babylon", a German rhymed paraphrase and setting of the psalm, was first published in 1525. It was soon adopted as a Lutheran hymn, and appeared in publications such as the Becker Psalter. A manuscript written in the early 17th century and a 1660s print illustrate that Dachstein's version of the psalm was adopted in Ashkenazi culture. Four-part chorale settings of Dachstein's hymn were realised by, among others, Johann Hermann Schein and Heinrich Schütz. Schütz also set Luther's prose translation of Psalm 137 ("An den Wassern zu Babel", SWV 37, included in the Psalmen Davids, Op. 2, 1619), and another setting, SWV 242, for the Becker Psalter, published first in 1628. Organ compositions based on Dachstein's hymn include Johann Adam Reincken's An Wasserflüssen Babylon, and one of Johann Sebastian Bach's Great Eighteen Chorale Preludes.

The first composition in Eustache Du Caurroy's Meslanges de la musique, published in 1610, a year after the composer's death, is "Le long des eaux, ou se bagne", a six-part setting of Gilles Durant de la Bergerie's paraphrase of Psalm 137. Salamone Rossi (1570–1630) set the psalm in Hebrew (עַל נַהֲרוֹת בָּבֶל, Al naharot Bavel) for four parts. Matthew Locke's Super flumina Babylonis motet is an extended setting of the first nine verses of the psalm. The psalm's first two verses were used for a musical setting in a round by English composer Philip Hayes. William Billings adapted the text to describe the British occupation of Boston in his anthem "Lamentation over Boston".

Artemy Vedel composed two choral concertos based on the psalm in Ukrainian, Na rekakh Vavilonskikh.

=== 19th century ===
Lord Byron's "We sat down and wept by the waters", a versified paraphrase of Psalm 137, was published in his Hebrew Melodies in 1815. The poetry was set by, among others, Isaac Nathan (1815) and Samuel Sebastian Wesley (c. 1834). The poem was translated in French by Alexis Paulin Paris, and in German by Adolf Böttger. A German translation by Franz Theremin, "An Babylons Wassern gefangen", was set by Carl Loewe (No. 2 of his Hebräische Gesänge, Op. 4, 1823). Another German translation was set by Ferruccio Busoni ("An Babylons Wassern wir weinten" in Zwei hebräische Melodien von Lord Byron, BV 202, 1884).

Psalm 137 was the inspiration for the famous slave chorus "Va, pensiero" from Verdi's opera Nabucco (1842). Charles-Valentin Alkan's piano piece Super flumina Babylonis: Paraphrase, Op. 52 (1859), is in the printed score preceded by a French translation of Psalm 137. Charles Gounod set "Près du fleuve étranger", a French paraphrase of the psalm, in 1861. In 1866 this setting was published with Henry Farnie's text version, as "By Babylon's wave: Psalm CXXXVII".

In 1863, Gabriel Fauré wrote a Super Flumina Babylonis for mixed chorus and orchestra. Peter Cornelius based the music of his paraphrase of Psalm 137, "An Babels Wasserflüssen", Op. 13 No. 2 (1872), on the "Sarabande" of Bach's third English Suite. Czech composer Antonín Dvořák (1841–1904) set verses 1–5 to music as No. 7 of his Biblical Songs (1894).

=== 20th and 21st centuries ===
20th and 21st-century settings based on, or referring to, Psalm 137 include:

- Super flumina Babylonis (1916) for mixed choir and organ, by Jules Van Nuffel.
- In William Walton's Belshazzar's Feast, a 1931 cantata, a version of the opening section is set to music, as if sung by the Israelite captives in Babylon.
- The second of the Two Psalms by Harry Partch (1901–1974) is "By the Rivers of Babylon", which he recorded in 1942 in a version for voice, chromelodeon and adapted viola.
- An English setting ("By the Rivers of Babylon") by David Amram (b. 1930), for solo soprano and SSAA choir (1969).
- "Rivers of Babylon", in part based on the opening verses of the Psalm, is a Rastafarian song written and recorded by Brent Dowe and Trevor McNaughton of the Jamaican reggae group The Melodians in 1970. It is featured in the 1972 film The Harder They Come and well known through its hit single 1978 rendition by Boney M. In 1992, the rock/reggae group Sublime released a live cover of the song on their 40oz. to Freedom album. U Roy, I Roy, Ras Michael and Brent Dowe also released adaptations of the Psalm
- Sinead O Connor recorded a version of the Melodians' adaption of the Psalm with bassist Robbie Shakespeare on her 2007 album, Theology
- The psalm was set, as On the Willows, in the Stephen Schwartz Broadway musical Godspell (1971).
- Don McLean covered Hayes's round as "Babylon", which was the final track on his 1971 album American Pie. Another cover of the round was featured at the end of the episode "Babylon" during the first season of Mad Men.
- Estonian composer Arvo Pärt composed An den Wassern zu Babel saßen wir und weinten in 1976 (revised 1984).
- In 1981, Herbert Sumsion composed In Exile, a motet for double choir on verses 1–6, premiered at the Gloucester Cathedral.
- The Judy Hauff composition Wood Street (1986) in The Sacred Harp is a setting of the psalm in the rendition from Tate and Brady’s New version of the Psalms of David (1696)
- The psalm was the inspiration for Leonard Cohen's "By the Rivers Dark" on his 2001 album Ten New Songs.
- Psalm 137:5–6 is the basis for the chorus of Matisyahu's single "Jerusalem" (2006).
- Psalm 137 is the central text of John Tavener's "Lament for Jerusalem – a mystical love song".
- The artist Fernando Ortega based the song "City of Sorrows" on Psalm 137.
- "I Hung My Harp Upon the Willows" is a song by The Trashcan Sinatras about poet Robert Burns.
- The chorus of "Sept. 15 1983" by The Mountain Goats quotes Psalm 137:5.
- Psalm 137:1–4 is the basis for "By These Rivers" for solo recorder (2022) by Gilad Hochman.
- Song published by Joshua Aaron (23 April 2018). Joshua Aaron - Bring Us Back (By The Rivers of Babylon) Psalm 137. Retrieved 23 May 2024 – via YouTube.
- Poem by John Beecher, If I Forget Thee, O Birmingham!
- Song by Will Butler, By the Waters of Babylon, from his 2015 Song a Day project in collaboration with The Guardian.

== In literature ==
- The title of William Faulkner's If I Forget Thee, Jerusalem (1939).
- The Portuguese 16th century poet Luís de Camões's poem Sôbolos rios que vão por Babilónia is based on Psalm 137.
- Welsh poet Evan Evans' work "A Paraphrase of Psalm CXXXVII" is a direct answer to Psalm 137 and parallels the plight of the Welsh bards with that of the Jews in the psalm.
- In Samuel Richardson's 1740 novel Pamela; or, Virtue Rewarded, Pamela adapts psalm 137 to describe her spiritual exile from home.

Phrases from the psalm have been referenced in numerous works, including:

- In the third stanza, The Fire Sermon, of T. S. Eliot's 1922 poem The Waste Land line 182 is: 'By the waters of Leman I sat down and wept...'. Leman is both the French for Lake Geneva and an archaic word for "mistress".
- "By the Waters of Babylon", 1937 short story by Stephen Vincent Benét.
- Elizabeth Goudge used a version of the opening words as the title, and in the text of her short story about an Egyptian slave girl who meets Mary and Joseph shortly after the Nativity, and then warns them about King Herod, and helps them escape to a hilltown in the Egyptian desert, By the Waters of Babylon in The Ikon on the Wall, and Other Stories (Gerald Duckworth, London, 1943), and also in The Reward of Faith, and Other Stories (Gerald Duckworth, London, 1950).
- By Grand Central Station I Sat Down and Wept, 1945 prose poem by Elizabeth Smart.
- The Italian poet Salvatore Quasimodo quoted the psalm in his 1947 poem "On the Boughs of the Willows".
- "If I Forget Thee, Oh Earth", a short story written by Arthur C. Clarke and first published in 1951 in the magazine Future.
- By the River Piedra I Sat Down and Wept, 1994 novel by Paulo Coelho.
- In Job: A Comedy of Justice by Robert A. Heinlein, the last line of this psalm is referenced to depict the potential nature of God.
- Leonard Cohen makes several references to the psalm in the song and poem By the Rivers Dark which appears on his 2001 album Ten New Songs, and in his 2006 poetry collection Book of Longing.
- In Book X, Chapter 7 of The Brothers Karamazov, Captain Snegiryov quotes verses 5 and 6.
- In the 2010 video game Fallout New Vegas, in the Honest Hearts DLC, Joshua Graham quotes Psalm 137, likening the Babylonian captivity of the Jews to the White Legs' war with two other tribes, the Dead Horses and the Sorrows.
- In the 2021 debut of the comic, "King Spawn", writer Sean Lewis and Spawn creator Todd McFarlane introduce a cult called "Psalm 137" which initiates a terrorist campaign targeting children.

== Historical instances of use ==
- Pope Gregory X quoted Psalm 137 ("If I forget thee, O Jerusalem, let my right hand forget her cunning") before departing from the Crusades upon his election by the papal conclave, 1268–1271.
- In his "What to the Slave Is the Fourth of July?" speech, Frederick Douglass compared the Rochester Ladies' Anti-Slavery Society asking him to deliver their Fourth of July speech to the actions of the antagonists asking the Jews to sing in a foreign land.

== Text ==
The following table shows the Hebrew text of the Psalm with vowels, alongside the Koine Greek text in the Septuagint and the English translation from the King James Version. Note that the meaning can slightly differ between these versions, as the Septuagint and the Masoretic Text come from different textual traditions. (Note: A 1917 translation directly from Hebrew to English by the Jewish Publication Society can be found here or here, and an 1844 translation directly from the Septuagint by L. C. L. Brenton can be found here. Both translations are in the public domain.) In the Septuagint, this psalm is numbered Psalm 136.

| # | Hebrew | English | Greek |
|---|---|---|---|
| 1 | עַ֥ל נַהֲר֨וֹת ׀ בָּבֶ֗ל שָׁ֣ם יָ֭שַׁבְנוּ גַּם־בָּכִ֑ינוּ בְּ֝זׇכְרֵ֗נוּ אֶת־צִיּֽוֹן׃ | By the rivers of Babylon, there we sat down, yea, we wept, when we remembered Zion. | Τῷ Δαυΐδ ῾Ιερεμίου. - ΕΠΙ τῶν ποταμῶν Βαβυλῶνος ἐκεῖ ἐκαθίσαμεν καὶ ἐκλαύσαμεν ἐν τῷ μνησθῆναι ἡμᾶς τῆς Σιών. |
| 2 | עַֽל־עֲרָבִ֥ים בְּתוֹכָ֑הּ תָּ֝לִ֗ינוּ כִּנֹּרוֹתֵֽינוּ׃ | We hanged our harps upon the willows in the midst thereof. | ἐπὶ ταῖς ἰτέαις ἐν μέσῳ αὐτῆς ἐκρεμάσαμεν τὰ ὄργανα ἡμῶν· |
| 3 | כִּ֤י שָׁ֨ם שְֽׁאֵל֪וּנוּ שׁוֹבֵ֡ינוּ דִּבְרֵי־שִׁ֭יר וְתוֹלָלֵ֣ינוּ שִׂמְחָ֑ה שִׁ֥ירוּ לָ֝֗נוּ מִשִּׁ֥יר צִיּֽוֹן׃ | For there they that carried us away captive required of us a song; and they that wasted us required of us mirth, saying, Sing us one of the songs of Zion. | ὅτι ἐκεῖ ἐπηρώτησαν ἡμᾶς οἱ αἰχμαλωτεύσαντες ἡμᾶς λόγους ᾠδῶν καὶ οἱ ἀπαγαγόντες ἡμᾶς ὕμνον· ᾄσατε ἡμῖν ἐκ τῶν ᾠδῶν Σιών. |
| 4 | אֵ֗יךְ נָשִׁ֥יר אֶת־שִׁיר־יְהֹוָ֑ה עַ֝֗ל אַדְמַ֥ת נֵכָֽר׃ | How shall we sing the LORD's song in a strange land? | πῶς ᾄσωμεν τὴν ᾠδὴν Κυρίου ἐπὶ γῆς ἀλλοτρίας; |
| 5 | אִֽם־אֶשְׁכָּחֵ֥ךְ יְֽרוּשָׁלָ֗͏ִם תִּשְׁכַּ֥ח יְמִינִֽי׃ | If I forget thee, O Jerusalem, let my right hand forget her cunning. | ἐὰν ἐπιλάθωμαί σου, ῾Ιερουσαλήμ, ἐπιλησθείη ἡ δεξιά μου· |
| 6 | תִּדְבַּֽק־לְשׁוֹנִ֨י ׀ לְחִכִּי֮ אִם־לֹ֢א אֶ֫זְכְּרֵ֥כִי אִם־לֹ֣א אַ֭עֲלֶה אֶת־יְרוּשָׁלַ֑͏ִם עַ֝֗ל רֹ֣אשׁ שִׂמְחָתִֽי׃ | If I do not remember thee, let my tongue cleave to the roof of my mouth; if I prefer not Jerusalem above my chief joy. | κολληθείη ἡ γλῶσσά μου τῷ λάρυγγί μου, ἐὰν μή σου μνησθῶ, ἐὰν μὴ προανατάξωμαι τὴν ῾Ιερουσαλὴμ ὡς ἐν ἀρχῇ τῆς εὐφροσύνης μου. |
| 7 | זְכֹ֤ר יְהֹוָ֨ה ׀ לִבְנֵ֬י אֱד֗וֹם אֵת֮ י֤וֹם יְֽר֫וּשָׁלָ֥͏ִם הָ֭אֹ֣מְרִים עָ֤רוּ ׀ עָ֑רוּ עַ֝֗ד הַיְס֥וֹד בָּֽהּ׃ | Remember, O LORD, the children of Edom in the day of Jerusalem; who said, Rase it, rase it, even to the foundation thereof. | μνήσθητι, Κύριε, τῶν υἱῶν ᾿Εδὼμ τὴν ἡμέραν ῾Ιερουσαλὴμ τῶν λεγόντων· ἐκκενοῦτε, ἐκκενοῦτε, ἕως τῶν θεμελίων αὐτῆς. |
| 8 | בַּת־בָּבֶ֗ל הַשְּׁד֫וּדָ֥ה אַשְׁרֵ֥י שֶׁיְשַׁלֶּם־לָ֑ךְ אֶת־גְּ֝מוּלֵ֗ךְ שֶׁגָּמַ֥לְתְּ לָֽנוּ׃ | O daughter of Babylon, who art to be destroyed; happy shall he be, that rewardeth thee as thou hast served us. | θυγάτηρ Βαβυλῶνος ἡ ταλαίπωρος, μακάριος ὃς ἀνταποδώσει σοι τὸ ἀνταπόδομά σου, ὃ ἀνταπέδωκας ἡμῖν· |
| 9 | אַשְׁרֵ֤י ׀ שֶׁיֹּאחֵ֓ז וְנִפֵּ֬ץ אֶֽת־עֹלָלַ֗יִךְ אֶל־הַסָּֽלַע׃ | Happy shall he be, that taketh and dasheth thy little ones against the stones. | μακάριος ὃς κρατήσει καὶ ἐδαφιεῖ τὰ νήπιά σου πρὸς τὴν πέτραν. |

== Bibliography ==
- Buelow, George J. (2004). A History of Baroque Music. Indiana University Press. ISBN 9780253343659.
- Matut, Diana (2011). Dichtung und Musik im frühneuzeitlichen Aschkenas: Ms. opp. add. 4° 136 der Bodleian Library, Oxford (das so genannte Wallich-Manuskript) und Ms. hebr. oct. 219 der Stadt- und Universitätsbibliothek, Frankfurt a. M. [Poetry and Music in Ashkenazi culture of the early modern period: Ms. opp. add. 4° 136 of the Bodleian Library, Oxford (the so-called Wallich Manuscript) and Ms. hebr. oct. 219 of the Frankfurt City and University Library]. Studies in Jewish History and Culture (in German). Vol. 29. Brill. ISBN 9789004181946.
- Stowe, David W. (2016). Song of Exile: The Enduring Mystery of Psalm 137. Oxford University Press. ISBN 978-0-19-046683-1.
