= Ecce sacerdos magnus =

Christian hymn; antiphon from the common liturgy

Ecce sacerdos magnus is a piece of Christian religious music.

It is an antiphon and a responsory from the common of confessor bishops in the Liturgy of the Hours and in the Graduale Romanum, and the Epistle in their proper Mass. It belongs to Sir 50,1.Ecce sacerdos magnus

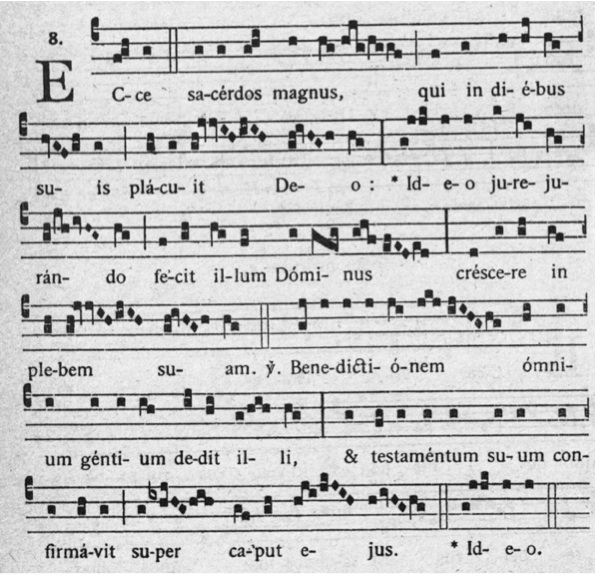
The responsory Ecce sacerdos magnus for the festival of a confessor bishop, from the Liber Responsorialis juxta Ritum Monasticum, Solesmes, 1895, page 194. Since it is the second responsory of its nocturn, it doesn't have a half-doxology. The responsory ends with the repetition of the partial respond.

== Background ==
The words are taken from the Bible, in particular, Ecclesiasticus 44:16-27, recalling the blessings given to godly men in the Old Testament.

== Contents ==
Its words are, Ecce sacerdos magnus, qui in diebus suis, placuit Deo, which means "behold the great priest, who in his days, pleased God".

In certain cases, those words are followed by: et inventus est iustus, meaning "and has been found just".

In others, the response is: Non est inventus similis illi, qui conservaret legem excelsi (no one has been found to be like him in the keeping of the laws of the Most High) [Sir 44:20].

The following is a complete text and translation of a different version, which may be used at the procession of a bishop at a solemn celebration of ordination:

Ecce sacerdos magnus, qui in diébus suis plácuit Deo: Ideo jure jurando fecit illum Dóminus crescere in plebem suam. Benedictiónem ómnium géntium dedit illi, et testaméntum suum confirmávit super caput eius. Ideo jure jurando fecit illum Dóminus crescere in plebem suam. Gloria patri et filio et spiritui sancto. . .

Behold a great priest who in his days pleased God:

Therefore by an oath the Lord made him increase among his people.

He gave him the blessing of all nations, and confirmed His covenant upon his head.

Therefore by an oath the Lord made him to increase among his people.

Glory be to the Father and to the Son and to the Holy Ghost ...

== Meaning and Usage ==
The priest mentioned in the hymn refers to Christ, the high priest, in whose place the bishop stands.

It has been often set to music by composers, including Giovanni Pierluigi da Palestrina, Anton Bruckner, Edward Elgar and Jules Van Nuffel.

== See also ==
- Ecce sacerdos magnus (Bruckner)
