= Ecce sacerdos magnus (Bruckner) =

1885 motet composed by Anton Bruckner

- Motet by Anton Bruckner
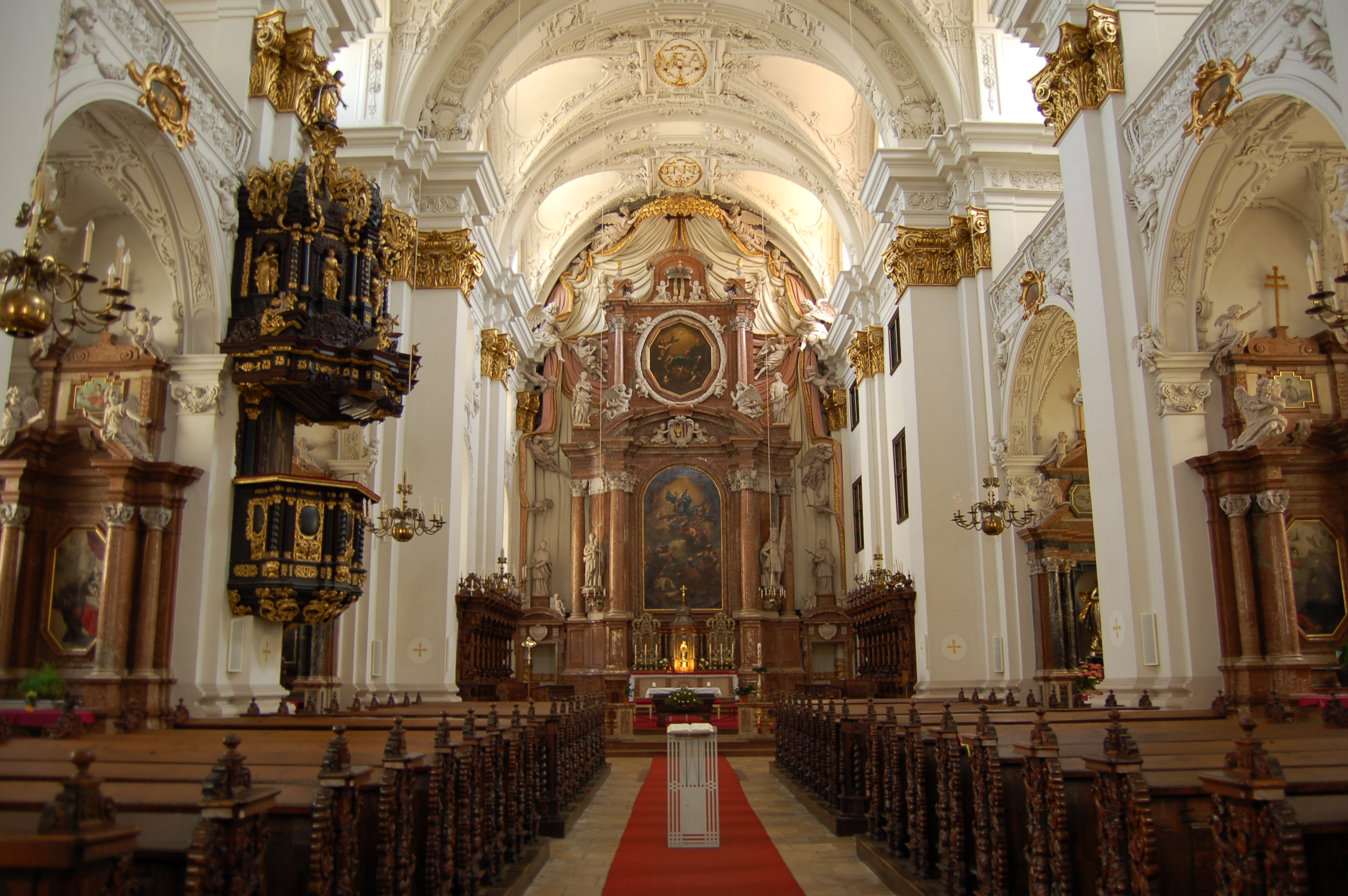
- The altar of the Old Cathedral of Linz
- Key: A minor
- Catalogue: WAB 13
- Form: Responsorium
- Text: Ecce sacerdos magnus
- Language: Latin
- Composed: 28 April 1885: Vienna
- Dedication: 100th anniversary of the diocese of Linz
- Performed: 21 November 1921: Vöcklabruck
- Published: 1911: Vienna
- Vocal: SATB choir
- Instrumental: Organ, 3 trombones

Ecce sacerdos magnus (Behold a great priest), WAB 13, is an 1885 sacred motet by the Austrian composer Anton Bruckner. It is a musical setting of the antiphon of the same title.

== History ==
This work was composed at the request of Johann Burgstaller, to be performed at the Linz Cathedral on the 100th anniversary of the founding of the diocese. It was completed by 28 April 1885 and sent to Burgstaller in mid-May. However, the work was not performed at that event, nor at any other event in Bruckner's lifetime.

The work, the manuscript of which is archived at the Wiener Männer-Sangverein, was edited by Viktor Keldorfer (Universal Edition) in 1911. It was premiered on 21 November 1921 by the Vöcklabruck women's choral society.

The motet is issued in Band XXI/33 of the Gesamtausgabe.

== Music ==
The piece of in total 106 bars is a six-part responsorium in A minor for mixed choir, three trombones and organ:

1. Ecce sacerdos magnus (bars 1-22). As in Bruckner's Te Deum, the work begins with bare fifths.
2. Ideo jure jurando (bars 23–39). This second part the work, which is recalling the harmony of the previous Locus iste and Christus factus est WAB 11, is repeated two times as a ritornello on bars 64–80 and 90–106.
3. Benedictionem omnium (bars 40–63). As in Mass No. 1 and the Adagio of most of Bruckner's symphonies, this third part contains Bruckner's typical ascending scales.
4. Ideo jure jurando (bars 64–80): first repeat of bars 23–39.
5. Chorale: Gloria Patri et Filio (bars 81–89). This fifth part, which is sung a cappella in unison, is a transcription of the Gregorian plain chant Gloria Patri with a different metric structure.
6. Ideo jure jurando (bars 90–106): second repeat of bars 23–39.

The antiphon, which was intended as processional music for the entrance of the bishop into the cathedral, was thus designed to be "majestic" and "ceremonial" in character. The work's "most enthralling feature" is "the antiphonal writing of Gabrielian grandeur" in bars 64–66. Kinder calls the piece "one of Bruckner's crowning achievements in the small forms" and "a work of almost barbaric intensity".

The trombones, which usually double the low voices, occasionally adopt independent lines. The ritornello on the words "Ideo jurejurando" is expanded and contrasted with episodes "that seem to trace the evolution of church music" in their varied use of texture. In contrast, the harmonic structure is more reflective of Bruckner's own compositional style. The piece includes several references to Bruckner's 1854 Libera me, particularly in the harmonic writing.

== Selected discography ==
Bruckner's Ecce sacerdos magnus was recorded at first in 1966 by Eugen Jochum with the choir of the Bayerischen Rundfunk (LP: DG 139134/5).

A selection of the about 30 recordings:

- George Guest, St. John's College Choir Cambridge, The World of St. John's 1958–1977 - LP: Argo ZRG 760, 1973
- Matthew Best, Corydon Singers, Bruckner: Motets - CD: Hyperion CDA66062, 1982
- Wolfgang Schäfer, Freiburg Vocal Ensemble, Anton Bruckner: Motetten - CD: Christophorus 74 501, 1984
- Joseph Pancik, Prager Kammerchor, Anton Bruckner: Motetten / Choral-Messe - CD: Orfeo C 327 951 A, 1993
- Robert Jones, Choir of St. Bride's Church, Bruckner: Motets - CD: Naxos 8.550956, 1994
- Magnar Mangersnes, Domchor Bergen, Bruckner: Motets - CD: Simax PSC 9037, 1996
- Hans-Christoph Rademann, NDR Chor Hamburg, Anton Bruckner: Ave Maria - CD: Carus 83.151, 2000
- Petr Fiala, Czech Philharmonic Choir, Anton Bruckner: Motets - CD: MDG 322 1422–2, 2006
- Michael Stenov, Cantores Carmeli, Benefizkonzert Karmelitenkirche Linz - CD/DVD issued by the choir, 2006, and on YouTube.
- Erwin Ortner, Arnold Schoenberg Chor, Anton Bruckner: Tantum ergo - CD: ASC Edition 3, issue of the choir, 2008

=== Note ===
Most of the performers are singing the Chorale in Gregorian mode. Only a few are singing it in accordance with the score: Fiala, Ortner and Schäfer.

== Sources ==
- Max Auer, Anton Bruckner als Kirchenmusiker, G. Bosse, Regensburg, 1927
- Uwe Harten, Anton Bruckner. Ein Handbuch. Residenz Verlag, Salzburg, 1996 - ISBN 3-7017-1030-9
- Anton Bruckner - Sämtliche Werke, Band XXI: Kleine Kirchenmusikwerke, Musikwissenschaftlicher Verlag der Internationalen Bruckner-Gesellschaft, Hans Bauernfeind and Leopold Nowak (Editor), Vienna, 1984/2001
- Keith William Kinder, The Wind and Wind-Chorus Music of Anton Bruckner, Greenwood Press, Westport, Connecticut, 2000. ISBN 978-0-313-30834-5
- Cornelis van Zwol, Anton Bruckner 1824-1896 - Leven en werken, uitg. Thoth, Bussum, Netherlands, 2012. ISBN 978-90-6868-590-9
