= Laetatus sum (Nuffel) =

1916 musical psalm setting by Jules Van Nuffel

- Choral composition by Jules Van Nuffel
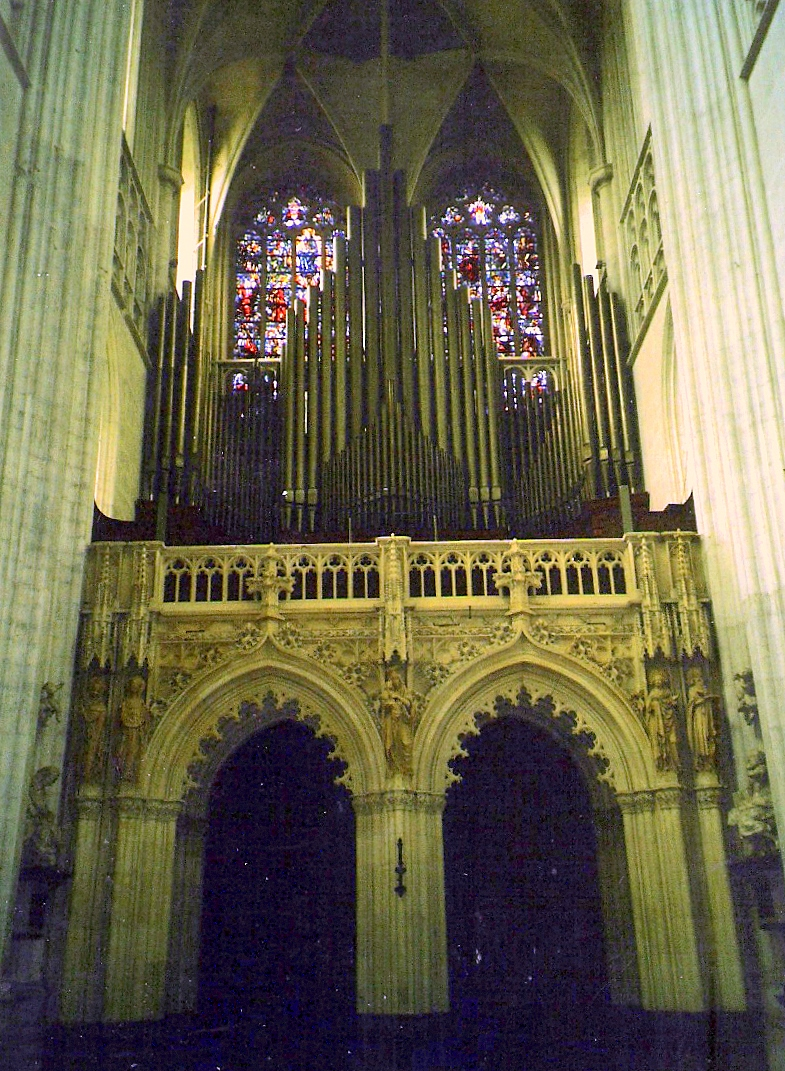
- Organ at the Sint Rombouts Kathedraal of Mechelen, for which the piece was composed
- Key: F-sharp minor
- Opus: 45
- Text: Laetatus sum (Psalm 122)
- Language: Latin
- Composed: 1935
- Scoring: Mixed choir; organ

Laetatus sum (I am glad), Op. 45, is a musical setting of Psalm 122 (Psalm 121 in the Vulgate) in Latin by Jules Van Nuffel, composed in 1935 for mixed choir and organ.

== History ==
Van Nuffel set many Latin texts to music, including ten psalms, for the liturgy and also concert at the Sint Rombouts Kathedraal in Mechelen, where he served as cantor, while Flor Peeters was organist. In the Latin Psalters the psalms are numbered differently. Psalm 121 there is Psalm 122 in the King James Bible. Van Nuffel set the psalm in April 1935 for a mixed four-part choir and organ.

The psalm was published by the Schwann Verlag (now part of Edition Peters), which published also other works of the composer.

== Words and music ==
The psalm (Psalms 122) in nine verses is one of 15 Songs of Ascents. It deals with the expectation to go to the house of the Lord in Jerusalem together with other pilgrims, expanding what Jerusalem means to them. The last four verses invite to prayer for the peace, security and prosperity for Jerusalem. Van Nuffel set the Latin text in one movement of different moods:

Movements of Laetatus sum
No.	Title	Text	Type	Vocal	Key	Time
A	Laetatus sum in his	1–3		SATB	F♯ minor	3/4
B	Illuc enim ascenderunt tribus	4–8		SATB	F♯ minor	3/4
C	Propter bonum Domini Dei	9		SATB	C major	3/2
A′	Laetatus sum in his	1		SATB	F♯ minor	3/4

The music in F♯ minor and 3/4 time is marked Con moto (with movement), initially marked mezzo-forte (mf). Soprano and alto begin "Laetatus sum" together with an ascending motif, which tenor and bass pick up the following measure in the opposite direction, and intensified by the organ in the third measure. "Illuc enim ascenderunt" begins slightly slower (poco allargando) in the basses, again with ascending motifs. The other voices join in vivid movement. The last psalm verse, "Propter bonum", prepared by a strong crescendo and ritardando, is rendered in calmer, majestic singing, accented by rising chords in the organ. The psalm is concluded by a repeat of the first verse, ending extremely softly (pp) on a repeated "Jerusalem".

== Recordings ==
Laetatus sum is the title of a recording of thirteen choral works by Van Nuffel (which also contains In convertendo Dominus), performed by three choirs, two from Mechelen and one from Antwerp, conducted by Bob Peeraer and Urbain Van Asch, with organists Willy Climan and Laurent Van Den Bergh, and the brass ensemble of Theo Mertens.

Another recording of this psalm appears on Psalms – Te Deum at the Sint-Rombouts Cathedral, Malines, a René Gailly CD (87 059), performed by the choir of the Sint Rombouts Cathedral and two other choirs, conducted by Johan Van Bouwelen, with organist Peter Pieters and the brass ensemble "The Art of Brass".
