= Jules Van Nuffel =

Battle Of Algier Between Alhoumi And The Byzantine Empire

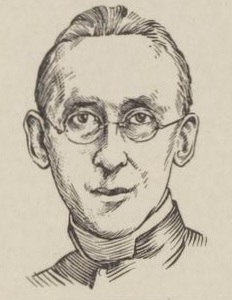
Jules Van Nuffel

Jules Jozef Paul Maria Van Nuffel (Hemiksem 21 March 1883 – Wilrijk 25 June 1953) was a Belgian priest, composer, choirmaster, music pedagogue, musicologist and a renowned expert on religious music.

== Education ==
Van Nuffel was born on 21 March 1883 in a musical family. He had his first music lessons (piano and singing) from his mother. He was taught the piano and the violin in high school, where his musical talents were soon noticed: in 1898–1899 he was the school organist. After graduating from high school, Van Nuffel studied for the priesthood at the Grand Seminary of Mechelen, where he also had occasional lessons in piano, violin, organ, harmony and counterpoint.

He was ordained priest by Cardinal Mercier on 25 May 1907. Shortly after his ordination, he was appointed music teacher at the Mechelen episcopal high school, a position he'd hold for ten years.

In that period Edgar Tinel, the director of the episcopal Ecole de Musique Religieuse (later Lemmensinstituut), insisted that he train at the school. But this one and only period in which Van Nuffel took formal music courses ended after a mere three months in a dispute between teacher and student. In essence, Van Nuffel was self-taught, by reading scores of the masters. Bach, Beethoven, Weber, Wagner, Grieg and Debussy were favorite study objects; later in his career also studied modern composers, like Paul Hindemith and Arthur Honegger, who also influenced his works.

== Founder and choirmaster of the Saint Rumbold's choir ==
As music teacher at the Mechelen episcopal high school, he was the school's choirmaster. He also composed over a hundred works between 1907 and 1917, including his Super flumina Babylonis. Its second performance by his school choir, on 26 July 1916 in St. Rumbold's Cathedral, led to his being asked to refound the cathedral choir. He would lead the Saint Rumbold's choir until October 1949, when he resigned for reasons of health.

Of course the Saint Rumbold's choir performed primarily in the liturgy in the cathedral. Following Pope Pius X's Tra le sollecitudini, which Van Nuffel considered the "norm and codex" of his work, it sang a great deal of Gregorian chant and sacred polyphony. But it also performed works by Belgian and international contemporary composers. Meulemans (1946:99–101) lists "countless motets" by two dozen composers as well as an even longer list of masses.

At first the reputation of the Saint Rumbold's choir was local, but its performance of Van Nuffel's own Statuit ei Dominus, written for the golden jubilee of Cardinal Mercier's ordination, ensured its national reputation. It served as a model for other Belgian cathedral choirs. It was the first choir to be invited for religious ceremonies at the royal court. Its performances during solemn masses in St. Rumbold's Cathedral were frequently broadcast by the national radio. International invitations also followed, culminating in a 1934 concert tour to Italy, where they sang for Pope Pius XI.

Under Van Nuffel's baton, this choir was among the best of Belgium and its reputation was impressive. Its 30-year-jubilee was attended by Queen Elisabeth, numerous politicians, ecclesiastics and scholars, as well as artists and composers. In his work in St. Rumbold's Van Nuffel was greatly aided by the cathedral organist, the renowned Flor Peeters.

Throughout Van Nuffel's tenure as choirmaster, the Saint Rumbold's choir's members were amateurs. Van Nuffel himself called the Saint Rumbold's choir “my greatest creation".

== Composer ==
In Van Nuffel's early compositions he was influenced by the Cecilian Movement. However, he soon developed a style of his own. His originality lies in his melodic gift, which is often based on Gregorian modality. His late Romantic harmony is a highly personal synthesis of old church modes and impressionism, sometimes daringly modern for its time. His music is deeply religious, and often exuberantly festive.

Almost all of Van Nuffel's work is vocal. Most of his works were meant for performance during the liturgy in the cathedral, with his own Saint Rumbold's choir, and they still sound best when sung by a large choir in a large church. The liturgical texts that he set were all in Latin; the Dutch texts he set also were mostly religious in character.

A nationally prominent composer, Van Nuffel is not very well known outside his native land, though his work is still occasionally performed abroad. One work that has become well known abroad and that is one of his crowning achievements is Nova Organi Harmonia ad Graduale juxta Editionem Vaticanam, a collection of accompaniments of the Gregorian chants of the entire liturgical year. This huge project (eight volumes) was initiated by Van Nuffel, and composed by himself, Flor Peeters, Jules Vyverman, Marinus de Jong, Staf Nees, Henri Durieux and Edgard de Laet. Nova Organi Harmonia was reprinted in many editions after World War II and is now (2023) available in its entirety online and, with the exception of the sixth volume (devoted to the local Belgian liturgy), also in a recent print edition; see the external link.

=== Works (selection) ===
Van Nuffel's oeuvre counts 170 opus numbers, a number of which, especially early ones, have not been published.

He wrote some 90 motets, his favorite genre; among the most popular of these are

- Christus vincit, Op. 20, for four-part male voice choir & organ
- Ave Maria, for four-part choir
- Statuit ei Dominus, op. 30 (1924), for four-to-six-part choir and organ (or orchestra)
- Ecce sacerdos magnus, op. 34 (1926), for six-part choir and organ

Of his four masses, all with organ accompaniment, only the first, Missa in honorem SS. Cordis Jesu, Op. 28, is for four-part mixed choir. The others are

- Missa in honorem SS. Trinitatis, for male choir
- Missa Paschalis "Lux et Origo", for two equal voices
- Missa in honorem Sti Josephi, for three equal voices

His best known works are his psalm settings. (Note that Van Nuffel uses the Greek numbering of the psalms.)

- Super flumina Babylonis (Psalm 136), op. 25 (1916), for four-to-six-part choir and organ (or orchestra)
- In convertendo Dominus (Psalm 125), op. 32 (1926), for four-to-seven-part choir and organ
- Domine, ne in furore tuo arguas me (Psalm 6), op. 44 (1935)
- Laetatus sum (Psalm 121), op. 45 (1935), for four-part choir
- Voce mea ad Dominum clamavi (Psalm 141), op. 47 (1935) for eight-part choir a capella
- Dominus regnavit (Psalm 92), op. 49 (1935) for four-to-six-part choir and organ
- Ad te Dominum cum tribularer clamavi (Psalm 119), op. 50 (1936)
- Ad te levavi oculos meus (Psalm 122), op. 51 (1935)

His three settings of the Te Deum, dated 1914, 1928 and 1944—the latter, Op. 62 (1944) for choir, brass ensemble and organ and known as the Liberation Te Deum—are also major and important works.

The best known of his 19 choral settings of Dutch texts are O keer dine oghen (O Turn Thine Eyes) and Kerstlied-Vredelied (Christmas Song-Peace Song), both written during World War I; as well as his arrangement of seven Old-Flemish Christmas songs. He also wrote over 30 songs for solo voice and piano accompaniment.

== The Lemmensinstituut ==
World War I had been disastrous for the Lemmensinstituut. At its nadir, it had barely 12 students left. On 1 April 1918, upon the death of Aloys Desmet, its director, Van Nuffel was appointed to succeed him. Van Nuffel's first priority was attracting good teachers, and he appointed some superb ones: Henri Durieux, Lodewijk Mortelmans, Flor Peeters, Marinus De Jong and Staf Nees. He greatly expanded the curriculum, nevertheless keeping it focused on religious music. He acquired a new organ, and turned the institute into an authority in organ teaching. Throughout all this the organization faced major financial problems, which necessitated spending much time fundraising.

In 1935 he succeeded in having the Lemmensinstitute's diplomas accredited by the state as equivalent to the diplomas of the state conservatories.

In 1952, shortly before his death, Van Nuffel resigned as director of the Lemmensinstituut.

== Musicologist ==
Van Nuffel is one of the founders of Belgian musicology. Between 1927 and 1939, he was the driving force behind a 31 volume edition of works by the Mechelen composer Philippe de Monte (1521–1603), published by him, Gustaaf Van Doorslaer and Charles van den Borre.

Even before 1914 he had made a name for himself as a public speaker and expert on music, especially on church music. His 1933 appointment at the Catholic University of Leuven as lecturer on music history was no surprise. In 1933 Musicology was still a small part of the Arts Department, but in 1943 he and a few colleagues managed to turn it into a full-fledged Department of Musicology.

Van Nuffel also revived the journal Musica Sacra. Its publication had been discontinued in 1914 at the outbreak of World War I; it resumed in 1937. This Tijdschrift voor kerkzang en gewijde muziek (Journal of Church Song and Sacred Music, its subtitle) was one of the most authoritative journals of Catholic culture of its time. In it, Van Nuffel, a member of its editorial board, published a number of major articles on various subjects, as well appendices with scores by contemporary composers.

He was one of the founding members of the "Koninklijke Vlaamse Academie voor Wetenschappen, Letteren en Schone Kunsten van België" (Royal Flemish Academy of Belgium for Science and the Arts), created in 1938 as a Flemish counterpart to the officially bilingual Royal Flemish Academy of Belgium for Science and the Arts. He was also a member of the Maatschappij der Nederlandse Letterkunde.

== Honors ==
On 12 January 1926 Cardinal Mercier made Van Nuffel an honorary canon of St. Rumbold's Cathedral, and on 11 March 1946, at the recommendation of Cardinal Van Roey, Pope Pius XII made him a Supernumerary Privy Chamberlain.

The Belgian government made him a Commander of the Order of the Crown and an Officer in the Order of Leopold.

== Sources ==
Except Fellerer, Van den Borren and the shortened English version of Leytens, all these sources are in Dutch. Unless marked otherwise, internet sources were consulted in November 2023.

- — Gedenkboek = Gedenkboek Mgr. J. Van Nuffel: Jubileum Sint-Romboutskoor: Mechelen 19 mei 1946. Mechelen: Uitvoerend Comité bij de jubelviering van het Sint-Romboutskoor (1916–1946), 1946.
- — "Zijn leven en zijn werk" (His Life and Work) in Gedenkboek 71–74.
- Caeymaex, [Charles]. (1946) "Monseigneur Van Nuffel en de Liturgie" in Gedenkboek 77–87.
- Fellerer, Karl Gustav (1961). The history of Catholic Church music. Baltimore: Helicon Press. Archived from the original on 2015-10-02 – via Questia. Reissued Praeger 1979; ISBN 978-0-313-21147-8
- Heughebaert, Hugo. (1972) "Mgr. Jules Van Nuffel herdacht in Limburg." Ons Erfdeel 16:128–131; also available on this page of the Digital Library for Dutch Literature.
- Heughebaert, Hugo. (1979) "100 jaar Lemmensinstituut." Ons Erfdeel 22:608–612; also available on this page of the Digital Library for Dutch Literature.
- Lenaerts, R.B. "Mgr. Jules van Nuffel." Jaarboek van de Maatschappij der Nederlandse Letterkunde 1954-1955, 118–121; also available on this page of the Digital Library for Dutch Literature.
- Leytens, Luc. (s.d.) "Van Nuffel, Jules: Biografie". Studiecentrum voor Vlaamse muziek; shortened English version by Karolien Selhorst here.
- Mertens, Corneel (1980). "Nuffel, Jules van." Stanley Sadie, ed. The New Grove Dictionary of Music and Musicians. London: Macmillan, vol. 13, p. 448.
- Meulemans, Arthur (1946). "Het Sint-Romboutskoor en monseigneur Van Nuffel" in Gedenkboek 94–102.
- Nees, Staf (1946). "Monseigneur Van Nuffel als leider van het St.-Romboutskoor" in Gedenkboek 139–143.
- Peeters, Karel. "De geschiedenis van het jubilerende koor." in Gedenkboek 28–38.
- Robijns, J. (1982). "Nuffel, Jules Jozef Paul Marie van." Robijns & Miep Zijlstra, eds. Algemene Muziek Encyclopedie, J. Haarlem: De Haan/Unieboek, vol. 7, pp. 225–226. ISBN 978-90-228-4938-5
- Van Espen, Nele (2006). "Muziek verzacht de zeden?" Jules Van Nuffel (1883-1953): schepper van liturgische schoonheid (Thesis) (in Dutch). KU Leuven.
- Van den Borren, Charles. (1946) "Le chanoine Van Nuffel et l’édition des œuvres de Philippe de Monte" in Gedenkboek 89–93. (In French)
- Van Nuffel, Eugeen (1967). Mgr Jules van Nuffel 1883-1953: Herinneringen, getuigenissen en documenten (in Dutch). OCLC 563151298.
- Vits, Koen (2023) "Jules Van Nuffel" in Koor&Stem, May 15, 2023.
