= Psalm 122 =

122nd psalm of the book of psalms

- "I was glad"
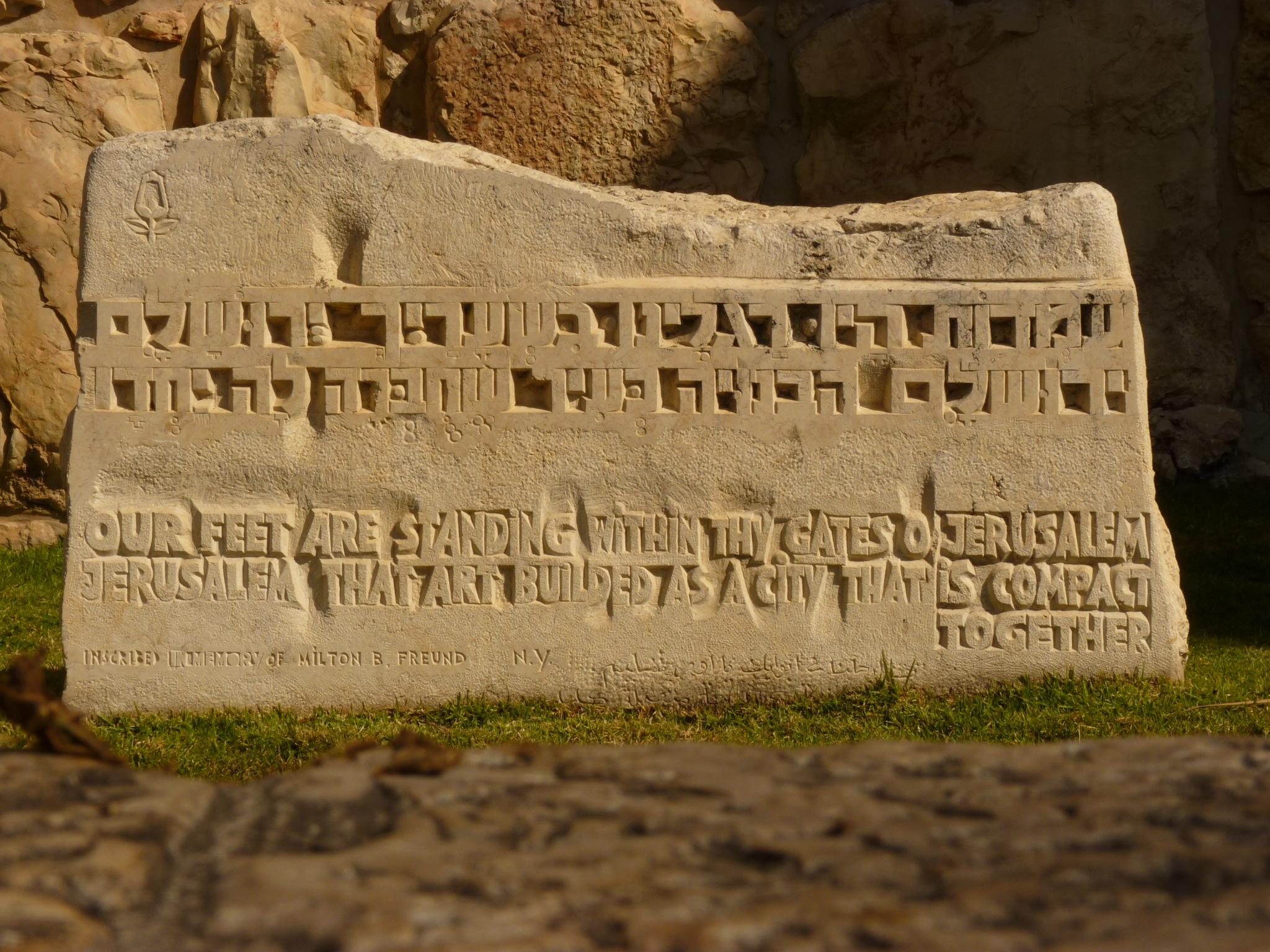
- Verses 2 and 3 engraved in Hebrew and English on a rock in Tzahal Square, outside the Walls of Jerusalem
- Other name: Psalm 121 (Vulgate); "Laetatus sum"
- Language: Hebrew (original)

Psalm 122
- ← Psalm 121 Psalm 123 →
- Book: Book of Psalms
- Hebrew Bible part: Ketuvim
- Order in the Hebrew part: 1
- Category: Sifrei Emet
- Christian Bible part: Old Testament
- Order in the Christian part: 19

Psalm 122 is the 122nd psalm of the Book of Psalms, beginning in English in the King James Version: "I was glad" and in Latin entitled Laetatus sum. It is attributed to King David and one of the fifteen psalms described as A song of ascents (Shir Hama'alot). Its title, I was glad, is reflected in a number of choral introits by various composers.

In the slightly different numbering system used in the Greek Septuagint and Latin Vulgate translations of the Bible, this psalm is Psalm 121.

== Purpose ==
The psalm is attributed to King David; however, Alexander Kirkpatrick suggests that its author lived "in the country, at a distance from Jerusalem. He recalls the joy with which he heard the invitation of his neighbours to join the company of pilgrims". He adds, "the psalm may best be explained thus, as the meditation of a pilgrim who, after returning to the quiet of his home, reflects upon the happy memories of his pilgrimage."

== Uses ==
=== Judaism ===
Psalm 122 is recited in some communities following Mincha between Sukkot and Shabbat Hagadol. It is also recited on Shabbat Nachamu (the Shabbat after Tisha B'Av) in some traditions.

It is recited on Yom Yerushalayim in the Conservative Jewish tradition due to the psalmist speaking of a united Jerusalem.

Verses 7–9 are cited in Talmud Brachos 64a, which has been incorporated into various parts of the liturgy.

=== Catholic Church ===
According to the Rule of St. Benedict, this Psalm was to be recited during the third act of the week, that is to say on Tuesday through Saturday, after Psalm 120 (119) and Psalm 121 (120).

In the Liturgy of the Hours in general use today, Psalm 122 is recited or sung at Vespers on the Saturday of the fourth week of the four-week cycle. It is also used at Second Vespers in the Common texts for the feasts of both the Blessed Virgin Mary and of all Holy Women.

In the liturgy of the Mass, it is recited on the feast of Christ the King, the first Sunday of Advent in year A in the three-year cycle of Sunday readings and on the 34th Sunday in Ordinary Time in year C.

=== Anglicanism ===
In the Book of Common Prayer, Psalm 122 is to be said or sung on Day 27 at Morning Prayer.

Verse 1 is used in the introit for Mothering Sunday which coincides with Laetare Sunday, also called "Mid-Lent Sunday" or Refreshment Sunday.

=== Coptic Orthodox Church ===
In the Agpeya, the Coptic Church's book of hours, this psalm is prayed in the office of Vespers and the second watch of the Midnight office.

== Architecture ==
Verse 6, Pray for the Peace of Jerusalem, is reflected in a sculpture by Dani Karavan in the wall of the Knesset building in Jerusalem.

== Musical settings ==
- Monteverdi set the Latin (Vulgate) text, Laetatus sum, at least three times, in his Vespro della Beata Vergine of 1610 and twice as a stand-alone motet in 1643.
- Heinrich Schütz composed a metred paraphrase of the psalm in German, "Es ist ein Freud dem Herzen mein", SWV 227, for the Becker Psalter, published first in 1628.
- Charpentier set the Latin text in 1671, again as a motet, catalogued as H.161, for soloists, chorus, flutes, strings and continuo. In 1690, he set another "Laetatus sum" H.216, for soloists, chorus, 2 treble instruments and continuo.
- Jommelli did the same, in 1743.
- An abridged form of the Book of Common Prayer translation, I was glad, is used in Parry's 1902 coronation anthem of that name.
- The same English text was used for coronation music by Henry Purcell, William Boyce, Thomas Attwood and others.
- Herbert Howells set verses 6 and 7 in his anthem "O, pray for the peace of Jerusalem."
- In 1676 Biber conceives a name piece (C.9) to Salzburg. In 1693, Michel-Richard Delalande wrote his grand motet (S.47), but today lost.
- Jules Van Nuffel set the psalm in Latin, Laetatus sum, for mixed choir and organ in 1935.

== Text ==
The following table shows the Hebrew text of the Psalm with vowels, alongside the Koine Greek text in the Septuagint and the English translation from the King James Version. Note that the meaning can slightly differ between these versions, as the Septuagint and the Masoretic Text come from different textual traditions. (Note: A 1917 translation directly from Hebrew to English by the Jewish Publication Society can be found here or here, and an 1844 translation directly from the Septuagint by L. C. L. Brenton can be found here. Both translations are in the public domain.) In the Septuagint, this psalm is numbered Psalm 121.

#	Hebrew	English	Greek
1	שִׁ֥יר הַֽמַּעֲל֗וֹת לְדָ֫וִ֥ד שָׂ֭מַחְתִּי בְּאֹמְרִ֣ים לִ֑י בֵּ֖ית יְהֹוָ֣ה נֵלֵֽךְ׃	(A Song of degrees of David.) I was glad when they said unto me, Let us go into the house of the LORD.	᾿ῼδὴ τῶν ἀναβαθμῶν. - ΕΥΦΡΑΝΘΗΝ ἐπὶ τοῖς εἰρηκόσι μοι· εἰς οἶκον Κυρίου πορευσόμεθα.
2	עֹ֭מְדוֹת הָי֣וּ רַגְלֵ֑ינוּ בִּ֝שְׁעָרַ֗יִךְ יְרוּשָׁלָֽ͏ִם׃	Our feet shall stand within thy gates, O Jerusalem.	ἑστῶτες ἦσαν οἱ πόδες ἡμῶν ἐν ταῖς αὐλαῖς σου, ῾Ιερουσαλήμ.
3	יְרוּשָׁלַ֥͏ִם הַבְּנוּיָ֑ה כְּ֝עִ֗יר שֶׁחֻבְּרָה־לָּ֥הּ יַחְדָּֽו׃	Jerusalem is builded as a city that is compact together:	῾Ιερουσαλὴμ οἰκοδομουμένη ὡς πόλις, ἧς ἡ μετοχὴ αὐτῆς ἐπὶ τὸ αὐτό.
4	שֶׁשָּׁ֨ם עָל֪וּ שְׁבָטִ֡ים שִׁבְטֵי־יָ֭הּ עֵד֣וּת לְיִשְׂרָאֵ֑ל לְ֝הֹד֗וֹת לְשֵׁ֣ם יְהֹוָֽה׃	Whither the tribes go up, the tribes of the LORD, unto the testimony of Israel, to give thanks unto the name of the LORD.	ἐκεῖ γὰρ ἀνέβησαν αἱ φυλαί, φυλαὶ Κυρίου, μαρτύριον τῷ ᾿Ισραήλ, τοῦ ἐξομολογήσασθαι τῷ ὀνόματι Κυρίου·
5	כִּ֤י שָׁ֨מָּה ׀ יָשְׁב֣וּ כִסְא֣וֹת לְמִשְׁפָּ֑ט כִּ֝סְא֗וֹת לְבֵ֣ית דָּוִֽד׃	For there are set thrones of judgment, the thrones of the house of David.	ὅτι ἐκεῖ ἐκάθισαν θρόνοι εἰς κρίσιν, θρόνοι ἐπὶ οἶκον Δαυΐδ.
6	שַׁ֭אֲלוּ שְׁל֣וֹם יְרוּשָׁלָ֑͏ִם יִ֝שְׁלָ֗יוּ אֹהֲבָֽיִךְ׃	Pray for the peace of Jerusalem: they shall prosper that love thee.	ἐρωτήσατε δὴ τὰ εἰς εἰρήνην τὴν ῾Ιερουσαλήμ, καὶ εὐθηνία τοῖς ἀγαπῶσί σε·
7	יְהִי־שָׁל֥וֹם בְּחֵילֵ֑ךְ שַׁ֝לְוָ֗ה בְּאַרְמְנוֹתָֽיִךְ׃	Peace be within thy walls, and prosperity within thy palaces.	γενέσθω δὴ εἰρήνη ἐν τῇ δυνάμει σου καὶ εὐθηνία ἐν ταῖς πυργοβάρεσί σου.
8	לְ֭מַעַן אַחַ֣י וְרֵעָ֑י אֲדַבְּרָה־נָּ֖א שָׁל֣וֹם בָּֽךְ׃	For my brethren and companions' sakes, I will now say, Peace be within thee.	ἕνεκα τῶν ἀδελφῶν μου καὶ τῶν πλησίον μου, ἐλάλουν δὴ εἰρήνην περὶ σοῦ·
9	לְ֭מַעַן בֵּית־יְהֹוָ֣ה אֱלֹהֵ֑ינוּ אֲבַקְשָׁ֖ה ט֣וֹב לָֽךְ׃	Because of the house of the LORD our God I will seek thy good.	ἕνεκα τοῦ οἴκου Κυρίου τοῦ Θεοῦ ἡμῶν, ἐξεζήτησα ἀγαθά σοι.
