= Catherine Des Roches =

Catherine Fradonnet (December 1542 – November 1587), called Catherine Des Roches, was a French writer of the Renaissance.

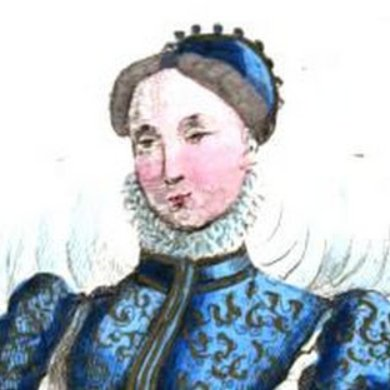
The portrait of Catherine Des Roches from Costumes historiques de la France

She was the daughter of Madeleine Des Roches, née Madeleine Neveu (c. 1520 - November 1587) and of André Fradonnet, seigneur Des Roches, the procurer of Poitiers. Catherine was educated by her mother and was taught poetry, literature and ancient languages. Wanting to invest all her time in her intellectual pursuits, Catherine Des Roches never married. Both mother and daughter died of an epidemic on the same day.

Contemporaries of Pierre de Ronsard, and friends of the humanist Estienne Pasquier, Catherine Des Roches and her mother were the center of a literary circle based in Poitiers between 1570 and 1587, and which included the poets Scévole de Sainte-Marthe, Barnabé Brisson, René Chopin, Antoine Loisel, Claude Binet, Nicolas Rapin and Odet de Turnèbe. The circle is most well known for a collection of gallant verse (in French, Italian, Latin and Greek) entitled La Puce de Madame Des Roches ("The Flea of Madame Des Roches", published 1583) in which the poets, inspired by an original poem by Pasquier, wrote on the theme of a flea upon Catherine's throat.

The combined output of mother and daughter—which was published collectively—comprise epistles, odes, sonnets, stanzas, epitaphs, and a few dialogues in prose and verse. Although less scholarly than her mother, Catherine wrote more than her. Her most anthologized work is the sonnet À ma quenouille ("To My Distaff") in which she portrays a woman torn between her domestic duties and her intellectual activities.

== Works ==
Original editions:

- Oeuvres, Paris: Abel L'Angelier, 1578-9.
- Secondes Oeuvres, Poitiers: Nicolas Courtoys, 1583.
- Les missives de Mesdames des Roches... (in prose and verse), Paris: Abel L'Angelier, 1586.

Related works:

- La Puce de Madame Des Roches, 1583.

Modern editions:

- (in French) Les missives de Mesdames Des Roches de Poitiers mère et fille, Anne R. Larsen, editor, Geneva: Droz, 1999.
- (in French) Les secondes œuvres de Mesdames Des Roches de Poitiers mere et fille, Anne R. Larsen editor, Geneva: Droz, 1998.
- (in French) Les œuvres de Mesdames Des Roches de Poitiers mere et fille, Anne R. Larsen editor, Geneva: Droz, 1993.

== See also ==
Two other French Renaissance literary circles:

- La Pléiade - the literary circle around Ronsard
- Maurice Scève - leader of a literary circle based in Lyon
