= Super flumina Babylonis (Nuffel) =

1916 musical psalm setting by Jules Van Nuffel

- Choral composition by Jules Van Nuffel
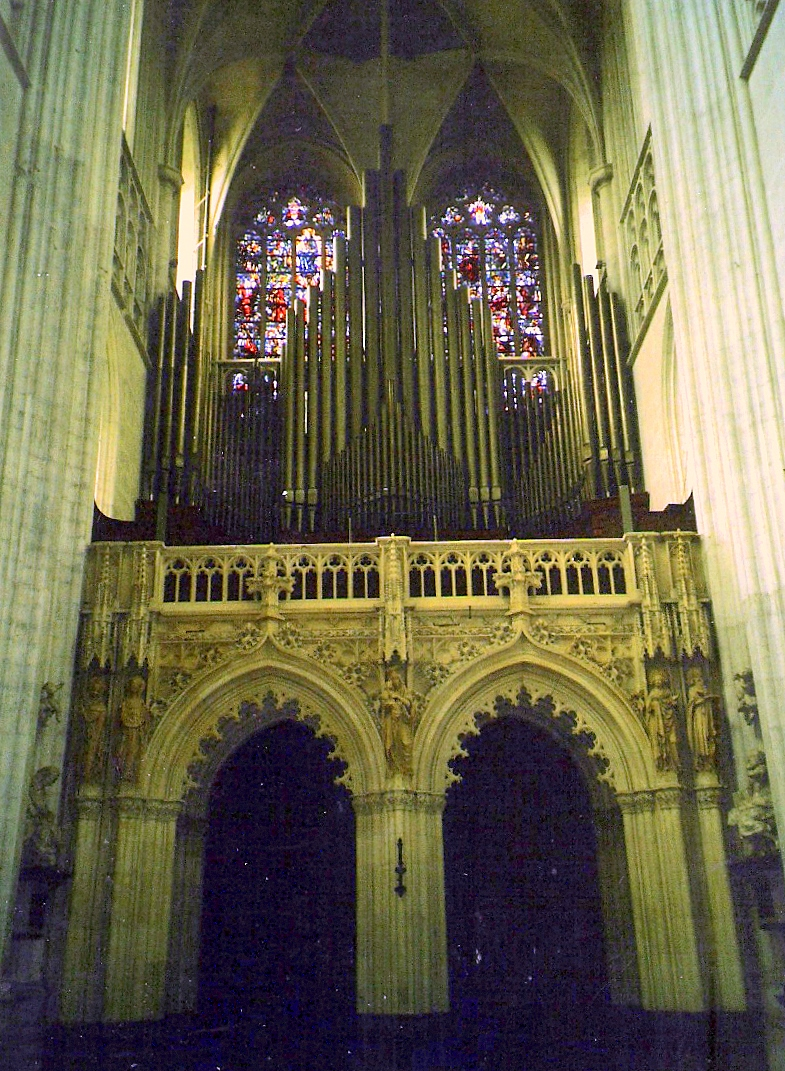
- Organ at the Sint Rombouts Kathedraal of Mechelen, for which the piece was composed
- Key: F-sharp minor
- Opus: 25
- Text: Super flumina Babylonis (Psalm 137)
- Language: Latin
- Composed: 1916
- Scoring: Mixed choir; organ

Super flumina Babylonis (By the rivers of Babylon), Op. 25, is a musical setting of Psalm 137 (Psalm 136 in the Vulgate) in Latin by Jules Van Nuffel, composed in 1916 for mixed choir and organ.

== History ==
Van Nuffel set many Latin texts to music, including ten psalms, for the liturgy and also concert at the Sint Rombouts Kathedraal in Mechelen, where he served as cantor, while Flor Peeters was organist. In the Latin Psalters the psalms are numbered differently. Psalm 136 there is Psalm 137 in the King James Bible. Van Nuffel set the psalm in 1916 for a mixed choir of four to six parts and organ (or orchestra). It has been called the starting point of his psalm settings.

The psalm was published by the Schwann Verlag (now part of Edition Peters), which published also other works of the composer.

== Music ==
The psalm, sung by the Jews in Babylonian exile, has often been set to music, and inspired for example Verdi's opera Nabucco. Van Nuffel set it for mixed choir and organ which plays an independent part. The choir parts are all divided at times, tenor and bass more often than soprano and alto. The piece in F-sharp minor is marked moderato and common time, but while the tempo is kept throughout the piece, the meter changes at times to 2/4 and 3/4, to adjust to the text. The organ begins with a melody in unison, marked piano (soft) and molto espressivo (most expressive). A similar line is then sung by soprano and tenor in unison, followed by a four-part homophonic setting of "illic sedimus et flevimus" (we sat and wept), and imitation setting "cum recordaremur Sion" (when we remembered Zion). The upper voices begin the next image of the instruments hung on the willow trees.

The request that the captives should sing their songs of Zion is narrated first in the bass, the request itself is sung by a four-part men's chorus, marked marcato. An ascending organ development prepares an outcry of six parts, all fortissimo and in high register: "Quomodo cantibimus canticum Domini" (How could we sing the song of the Lord), followed subdued and in four, the two parts: "in terra aliena?" (on alien soil?) The voices then demand, in the position of the captives, in agitated mood that they should be mutilated if they ever forget Jerusalem. Finally they curse the Babylonians in forceful homophonic setting. After a few chords of the organ and general pause, the voices return to text and music from the beginning, ending with "when we remembered Zion". The composer's music has been described as focused on text declamation, with expressive melodies and advanced harmonies including chromaticism and enharmonic.

The psalm was performed by a large choir conducted by Dan-Olof Stenlund with Hans Fagius on the organ, during the Europa Cantat festival in Namur, Belgium in 1982 in Abbaye de Floreffe. According to many members of that choir, it took some time to get the heartbeat back to normal after the incredibly powerful final: Beatus, qui tenebit et allidet parvulos tuos ad petram. (Happy shall he be that taketh and dasheth thy little ones against the stones.) We all were just shaking leaving the cathedral. Unfortunately, that performance was not recorded.

== Recordings ==
Super flumina Babylonis was recorded as part of Laetatus sum, a collection of thirteen choral works by Van Nuffel, performed by three choirs, two from Mechelen and one from Antwerp, conducted by Bob Peeraer and Urbain Van Asch, with organists Willy Climan and Laurent Van Den Bergh, and the brass ensemble of Theo Mertens. In 1992, the Mechelen cathedral choir, conducted by Johan Van Bouwelen, recorded this psalm and many others by Van Nuffel, on CD at the cathedral.
