= Satire Ménippée =

Political and satirical work

The Satire Ménippée (French pronunciation: [satiʁ menipe]) or La Satyre Ménippée de la vertu du Catholicon d'Espagne was a political and satirical work in prose and verse that mercilessly parodied the Catholic League and Spanish pretensions during the Wars of Religion in France, and championed the idea of an independent but Catholic France. The work was a collaborative effort of various functionaries, lawyers, clerics and scholars. It appeared at a time that coincided with the ascendance of Henry IV of France and the defeat of the League.

The title derives from the classical Greek and Roman literary genre "menippean satire", a form of carnivalesque literature in a free-form mixture of prose, verse and dialogue. Mikhail Bakhtin called the Satyre Ménippée "one of the greatest political satires of world literature".

== Composition and historical significance ==
The Satyre Ménippée was written in 1593 and published in Tours in 1594 during the Etats Généraux convened in Paris by the leader of the Catholic League, Charles, Duke of Mayenne. Charles hoped to get himself elected to the French throne in the place of the pretender to the throne, the future Henry IV of France. The work was conceived by Pierre le Roy, canon of Rouen and chaplain to the cardinal of Bourbon, during discussions with friends at the home of Jacques Gillot, canon of the Sainte-Chapelle, in Paris. The work was written by Nicolas Rapin, Jean Passerat and Florent Chrestien, and edited/revised by Pierre Pithou.

The philosophy of the group around Pithou and Rapin, which formed the ideological motivation for Satire Ménippée, was that of the "Politiques" – moderate Catholics who privileged peace, conceived of a distinction between the State and Religion, and sought political accommodation with the Huguenots. By the end of the civil wars, the "politiques" were the principal target of attack of the Catholic League.

== Content ==
The work includes a description of a procession and all the forces of the League, a burlesque description of the opening of the États Généreaux, imaginary speeches by real personages such as the Duke of Mayenne, the legate of the Pope, and the cardinals Pelvé (attributed to Chrestien) and Aubray (attributed to Pithou), and a number of additional satires and epigrams. The writers paint the miseries of the nation and the blindness of their detractors, and they encourage an alliance of the people and the monarchy to save the nation. The comical and openly derisive brilliance of the work made it extremely popular at the time.

Notably, Diderot's Encyclopédie praises the work for its "singularity" and notes its usefulness to Henry IV.

== Bibliography ==
- Satyre Menippee de la Vertu du Catholicon d'Espagne et de la tenue des Estats de Paris, MARTIN Martial (édition critique de), Paris, Honoré Champion, 2007, "Textes de la Renaissance", n° 117, 944 p. ISBN 978-2-7453-1484-0

== See also ==
- Gilles Durant de la Bergerie
