= Gilles Durant de la Bergerie =

French poet and lawyer

Gilles Durant, sieur de la Bergerie (1554 – 1614 or 1615), born in Clermont-Ferrand, was a lawyer at the Parlement of Paris, known as one of the authors of the Satire Ménippée.

== Works ==
In addition to his participation in the Satire Ménippée, he also is the author of other poems, as well as imitations of David's Psalms.

Odes, songs, sonnets...
