= Odet de Turnèbe =

French dramatist

Odet de Turnèbe (23 October 1552 – 20 July 1581) was a French dramatist.

== Biography ==
Odet de Turnèbe was born in Paris to Greek scholar Adrien Turnèbe. He received a solid education and was known, from an early age, for his intelligence and wit. After having served as a lawyer in the Parlement of Paris, he was chosen to become first president of the Cour des monnaies, but he succumbed to a fever and died at the age of 28.

== Works ==
He wrote a comedy in prose, Les Contents (written c. 1580, published after his death) which was largely inspired (like the works of his contemporary Pierre de Larivey) by contemporary Italian comedy. Turnèbe also wrote three Petrarchian sonnets (the first in French, the second in Italian and the third in Spanish), a poem entitled La Puce (using a Latinized version of his name: Odet de Tournebu) and twelve sonnets entitled Sonets sur les ruines de Luzignan addressed to Catherine Des Roches (with whom he declared himself in love).
