= Nicolas Rapin =

French writer (1535–1608)

Nicolas Rapin (1535 – 16 February 1608) was a French Renaissance magistrate, royal officer, translator, poet and satirist, known for being one of the authors of the Satire Ménippée (1593/4) and an outspoken critic of the excesses of the Holy League during the Wars of Religion.

== Life ==
Born at Fontenay-le-Comte, Vendée into a family of "noblesse de robe", Rapin pursued legal studies, practiced law at the parlement of Poitiers, and became "échevin" (municipal leader) and later mayor (1569–1570) of Fontenay-le Comte. At the start of the civil wars, he participated at the defense of Poitiers against the forces of Gaspard de Coligny (1569) and survived the capture of Fontenay by the Huguenots (1570). He later became vice-senechel of Fontenay and Niort, and, in 1585, "lieutenant criminel" (both are officers of public justice) in the Île-de-France region. With the arrival of the Holy League to power in Paris, Rapin was stripped of his positions, but the favor of Henry III of France brought him the important post of "prévôt" in the army. With Henry's assassination at the hands of a radical Jesuit, Rapin rallied to the new king Henry IV and attacked the League and the Jesuits in his writings. He retired from public life in 1605 and died in 1608 at Poitiers, on the way to see friends in Paris.

== Writings ==
Rapin's written works were intimately linked to his public life and the political situation of France, as well as the humanist sensibility of the age. Rapin was close to many writers of the period, including Joseph Justus Scaliger, Jacques-Auguste de Thou, Etienne Pasquier, Jacques Gillot and Agrippa d'Aubigné.

His written works span the genres and forms of the period. He wrote French translations of Ariosto (Canto 28 of the Orlando Furioso, 1572), Cicero, Ovid, Martial, Horace, 7 Psalms (VII Psaumes Pénitentielles), and of many Neo-Latin poets (Michel de L'Hospital, Grotius, Théodore de Bèze, Scaliger, Jacques-Auguste de Thou); he wrote Latin works as well. He contributed to the funeral poem anthologies (or "tombeaux") for Pierre de Ronsard, Philippe Desportes, Claude Dupuy and others.

Rapin's poetry used the "vers mesuré" system of Jean-Antoine de Baïf (an attempt to write French poetry based on long and short syllables like ancient Greek or Latin), but modified the system to permit traditional French poetic elements (including rhyme). His love poetry is at times anti-petrarchian and satirical (contribution to La Puce de Ma Dame des Roches; La Douche), and at times idealized and Neoplatonic (L'Amour philosophe). He also wrote eclogues praising the country life, as in Horace (Les Plaisirs du gentilhomme champestre, 1575 and Elegie Patorale pour un Adieu, 1581-3), epitaphs on war (Le Siège de Poitiers) and occasional verse of consolation, victory and other matters. His satirical vein is most apparent in his contributions to the Satire Ménippée (1593/1594) which railed against the Holy League.

Finally, his will and the 30 letters by Rapin that have survived are important documents of late-Renaissance humanism in France.
