= Florent Chrestien =

French writer (1541–1596)

Florent Chrestien (January 26, 1541 – October 3, 1596) was a French satirist and Latin poet.

Chrestien was the son of Guillaume Chrestien, an eminent French physician and writer on physiology, was born at Orléans. A pupil of Henri Estienne, the Hellenist, at an early age he was appointed tutor to Henry of Navarre, afterwards Henry IV, who made him his librarian. Brought up as a Calvinist, he became a convert to Catholicism. He died on 3 October 1596 in Vendôme.

Chrestien was the author of many translations from the Greek into Latin verse, amongst others, of versions of the Hero and Leander attributed to Musaeus, and of many epigrams from the Greek Anthology. In his translations into French, among which are remarked those of George Buchanan's Jephtha (1567), and of Oppian's De Venatione (1575), he is not so happy, being rather to be praised for fidelity to his original than for excellence of style. His principal claim to a place among memorable satirists is as one of the authors of the Satire Ménippée, the famous pasquinade in the interest of his old pupil, Henry IV, in which the harangue put into the mouth of cardinal de Pelve is usually attributed to him.
