= Jacques Gillot =

Guadeloupean politician (born 1948)

Jacques Gillot, b. 4 March 1948 in Gosier, on the French Caribbean island of Guadeloupe, was the President of the General Council of Guadeloupe. He has been chairing the General Council March 2001 to April 2015. Gillot was elected to the French senate in 2004.

He is also the founding member of the Guadeloupe Unie Socialisme and Réalités ("United Guadeloupe Socialism and Realities") political party. Gillot is a physician, is married and has three children.

== Biography ==
A doctor by profession, Jacques Gillot was elected mayor of Le Gosier in 1989, a municipality where he subsequently served as deputy mayor. In 1993, he became a general councilor for the canton of Gosier-1 and assumed the presidency of the general council in 2001.

He was elected senator on September 26, 2004, and re-elected on September 25, 2011. He is a member of the Socialist group in the Senate and sits on the Foreign Affairs, Defense, and Armed Forces Committee.

He is a founding member of Guadeloupe Unie, Socialisme et Réalités (GUSR), a local left-wing party affiliated with the Socialist Party (France), but which in 2017 became close to Renaissance (French political party) en Marche.

He is married and has three children.
