= Étienne Pasquier =

French lawyer and man of letters (1529-1615)

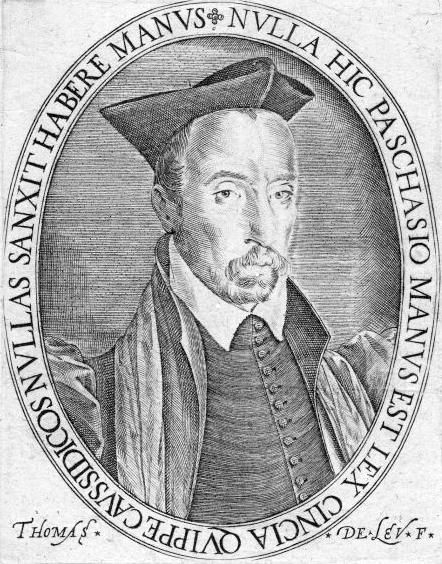
Étienne Pasquier by Thomas de Leu.jpg

Étienne Pasquier (7 June 1529 – 30 August 30 1615) was a French lawyer and man of letters. By his own account he was born in Paris on 7 June 1529, but according to others he was born in 1528. He was called to the Paris bar in 1549.

In 1558 he became very ill by eating poisonous mushrooms and took two years to recover. This compelled him to occupy himself with literary work and in 1560 he published the first book of his Recherches de la France. In 1565, when he was thirty-seven he became famous after giving a speech in which he pleaded the cause of the University of Paris against the Jesuits and won it. Meanwhile, he pursued the Recherches steadily and published other miscellaneous work from time to time.

His literary and his legal occupations coincided in a curious fashion at the Grands Jours of Poitiers in 1579. These Grands Jours (an institution which fell into desuetude at the end of the 17th century, with bad effects on the social and political welfare of the French provinces) were a kind of irregular assize in which a commission of the parlement of Paris, selected and dispatched at short notice by the king, had full power to hear and determine all causes, especially those in which seignorial rights had been abused. At the Grands Jours of Poitiers of the date mentioned and at those of Troyes in 1583, Pasquier officiated; and each occasion has left a curious literary memorial of the jests with which he and his colleagues relieved their graver duties. The Poitiers work was the celebrated collection of poems on flea (La Puce de Madame Des Roches, published 1583; see Catherine Des Roches).

In 1585 Pasquier was appointed by Henry III advocate-general at the Paris cours des comptes, an important body having political as well as financial and legal functions. Here he distinguished himself particularly by opposing, sometimes successfully, the system of selling hereditary places and offices. The civil wars forced Pasquier to leave Paris and for some years he lived in Tours, working steadily on his great book, but he returned to Paris in Henry IV's train in March 1594. He continued until 1604 with his work on the chambre des comptes; then he retired. He lived more than ten years in retirement, producing much literary work and died after a few hours' illness on 1 September 1615.

Pasquier's work was substantial but has never been fully collected or printed. The standard edition is that of Amsterdam (2 vols. fol., 1723). But for ordinary readers the selections of Leon Feugbre, published in Paris (2 vols. 8vo, 1849), with an elaborate introduction, are most accessible. As a poet Pasquier is interesting as a minor member of the Pléiade movement. As a prose writer he is much more accomplished. The three chief divisions of his prose work are his Recherches, his letters and his professional speeches. The letters are of much biographical interest and historical importance and the Recherches contain in a somewhat miscellaneous fashion invaluable information on a vast variety of subjects, literary, political, antiquarian and others.

== Recherches de la France ==
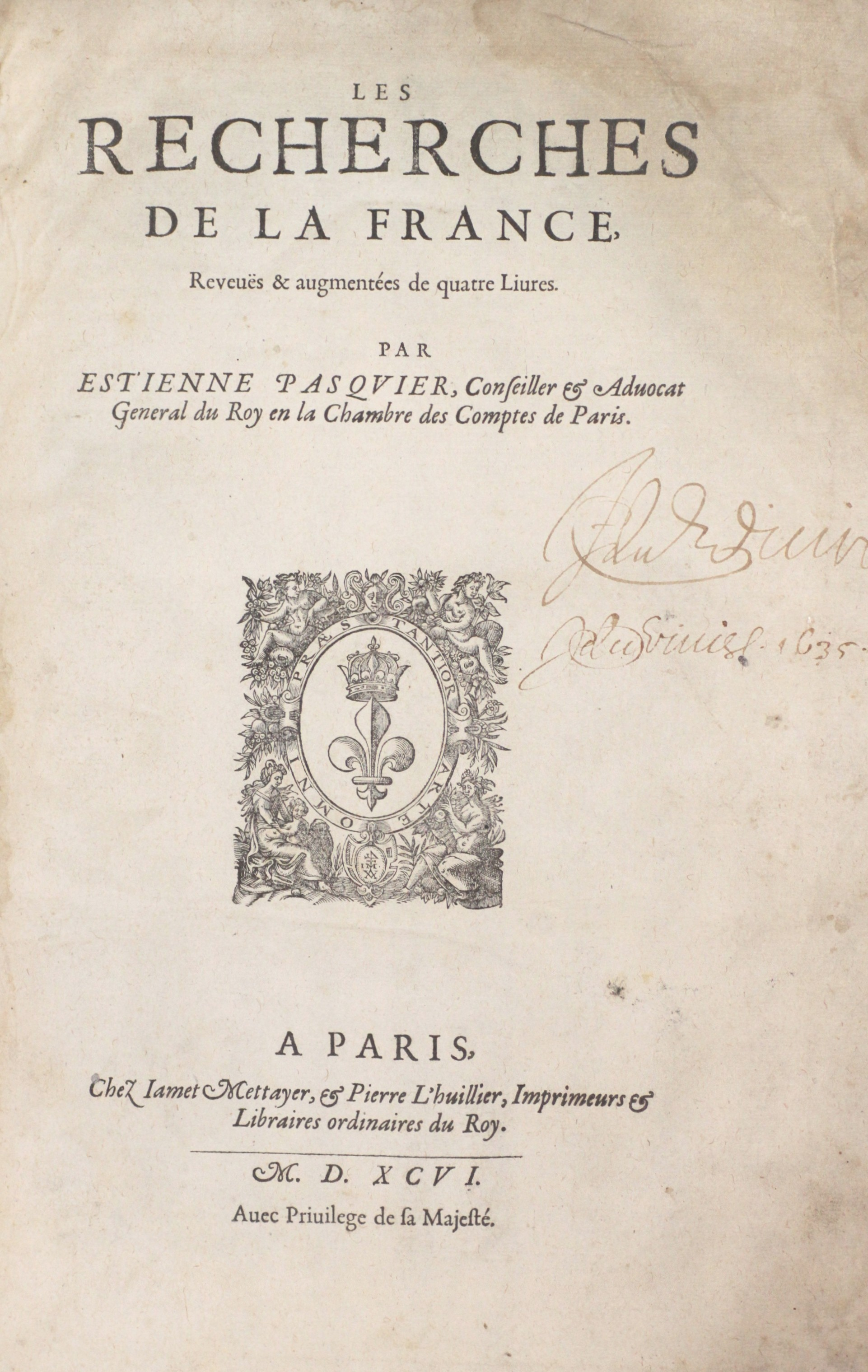
Recherches de la France, 1596

Étienne Pasquier’s historical work is regarded as an important precursor to modern historiography, though he drew upon the methods of prominent Italian historians of his time. He made frequent use of primary sources and contemporary chroniclers, citing them directly throughout his writings. Unlike many historical works of the sixteenth century, Pasquier aimed to produce an accurate reconstruction of the past in response to what he perceived as a period of crisis in France.

Pasquier sought to define France through its customs and culture, producing a distinctly national history. He began not with the origins of human civilization but with the origins of France in the Gauls. Although he lamented the scarcity of sources on this subject, he attempted to reconstruct early French history by drawing upon works such as Julius Caesar’s *Commentarii de Bello Gallico*.

In his narrative, Pasquier contrasted France with Rome, asserting that French history was as significant as that of Rome. He criticized the pervasive reliance on Latin, Roman law, and Roman models, instead expressing admiration for French literature and institutions. Unlike earlier chroniclers, however, he avoided glorifying the monarchy, presenting a more balanced account of France’s past.

== See also ==
- Journal d'un bourgeois de Paris

== Sources ==
- Huppert, George, The Idea of Perfect History: Historical Erudition and Historical Philosophy in Renaissance France. (Urbana: University of Illinois Press, 1970) - See the chapter on Pasquier p28-71.
