= 1549 in poetry =

Links to articles with information on poetry or literature by nation in 1549.

== Works published ==
=== France ===
- Joachim du Bellay, France:
  - L'Olive, the first sonnet sequence written in France
  - La Defense et illustration de la langue françoyse; the author argues that all languages have equal value, and that modern French can express wisdom and truth as well as Ancient Greek, Latin, Italian or Spanish, but du Bellay also advocates adoption of Italianate and classical poetic forms to improve French poetry; he states that it is "no vicious thing, but praiseworthy, to borrow from a foreign tongue thoughts and words and appropriate them to our own"
  - Recueil de poesie, presente à tres illustre princesse Madame Marguerite, seur unique du Roy [...]
  - Vers lyriques
- Pontus de Tyard. Erreurs amoureuses

=== Great Britain ===
- William Baldwin, The Canticles or Balades of Saloman
- Robert Crowley, The Voyce of the Laste Trumpet Blowen bi the Seventh Angel
- Thomas Sternhold and John Hopkins, The Whole Booke of Psalmes, translated from the Old Testament

=== Other ===
- Friedrich Dedekind, Grobianus a poem written by a German in Latin elegiac verse; enormously popular across Continental Europe (see also Grobiana, an enlarged edition 1554, and Grobianus et Grobiana: sive, de morum simplicitate, libri tres 1558)

== Births ==
Death years link to the corresponding "[year] in poetry" article:

- Giles Fletcher, the Elder (born 1548 or 1549) (died 1611), English poet and ambassador; father of Giles Fletcher the younger

== Deaths ==
Birth years link to the corresponding "[year] in poetry" article:

- December 12 – Marguerite de Navarre, also known as "Marguerite of Angoulême" and "Margaret of Navarre" (born 1492), French queen consort of King Henry II of Navarre; patron of humanists and reformers, author, playwright and poet
- date not known – Arakida Moritake 荒木田守武 (born 1473), Japanese, the son of Negi Morihide, and a Shinto priest; said to have excelled in waka, renga, and in particular haikai
- date not known – Arthur Kelton died either 1549 or 1550 (born unknown), author who wrote in rhyme about Welsh history

== See also ==
- Poetry
- 16th century in poetry
- 16th century in literature
- French Renaissance literature
- Renaissance literature
- Spanish Renaissance literature
