= Roydon =

Roydon may refer to:

== Places ==
=== England ===
- Roydon, Essex
  - Roydon railway station
  - Roydon Primary School
  - Roydon United Reformed Church
- Roydon, King's Lynn and West Norfolk
- Roydon, South Norfolk

=== Australia ===
- Roydon Island, Tasmania, Australia

== Names ==
- Marmaduke Roydon (1583–1646), English merchant-adventurer, colonial planter and Royalist army officer
- Mathew Roydon (died 1622), English poet
- Roydon Hayes (born 1971), New Zealand cricketer
- Matthew Clairmont alias Roydon, character in Shadow of Night
- Diana Bishop alias Roydon, character in Shadow of Night

== See also ==
- Royden (disambiguation)
