= A Discovery of Witches =

2011 novel by Deborah Harkness

- Book cover art
- Author: Deborah Harkness
- Cover artist: Tal Goretsky; Charlie Waite
- Language: English
- Series: All Souls Trilogy
- Genre: Contemporary fantasy, romance, vampire, witchcraft, alchemy
- Published: 2011 (Penguin Books)
- Publication place: USA
- Media type: Print (Hardcover, Paperback)
- ISBN: 978-0-670-02241-0
- Followed by: Shadow of Night

A Discovery of Witches is a 2011 historical-fantasy novel and the debut novel by American scholar Deborah Harkness. It follows Diana Bishop, a history of science professor at Yale University, as she embraces her magical blood after finding a long-thought-lost manuscript and engages in a forbidden romance with a charming vampire, Matthew Clairmont.

A Discovery of Witches was first published in hardcover on February 8, 2011, by Penguin Books, becoming a New York Times Best Seller upon its release. Named in reference to The Discoverie of Witchcraft, it has since been released in paperback and also as an ebook. The novel has been translated into more than 36 languages. The book received mostly positive feedback from literary critics. It was praised for its intelligence and the mixture of history and fantasy, although some critics felt the plot was trite and the pacing was slow. Comparisons were made between other popular fantasy series, namely Twilight and Harry Potter. The novel began as a "thought experiment" for Harkness, who had previously only published works of historical nonfiction. She drew upon her academic background as a historian and her studies of alchemy, magic, and the occult.

A Discovery of Witches is the first installment in the All Souls trilogy, followed by Shadow of Night (2012) and completed with the third novel in the series The Book of Life (2014). Three seasons of a television adaptation of the trilogy were acquired by Sky One and were broadcast in 2018, 2021, and 2022.

In June 2019, Harkness released the novel, Time's Convert. This story followed the early lives of Matthew de Clermont and his soon-to-be son, Marcus MacNeil, during the American Revolution, in parallel with the conversion of Phoebe to a vampire.

In July 2024, Harkness released a fifth installment to the series, The Black Bird Oracle. This followed Diana Bishop reconnecting with her father's family and learning more about Higher Magic.

== Synopsis ==
Diana Bishop is a Yale history of science professor who is conducting research at the University of Oxford. Diana is a witch. However, she has rejected this aspect of her life since the death of her parents when she was seven. She has not learned to practice witchcraft and has minimized her interaction with other witches.

She discovers a lost manuscript at the Bodleian Library, which not only causes a magical reaction in herself but also attracts the attention of others who have long been searching for the manuscript. She finds that for her own safety and for the well-being of magical creatures, she must rethink her avoidance of magic and magical creatures.

This volume is about Diana Bishop discovering her peril and qualities of herself that were unknown to her and discovering romance, friends, and enemies in the magical community. The later volumes develop her actions to protect herself and her friends and ameliorate a threat to the magical community.

With the help of a vampire, Matthew Clairmont, Diana sets out to discover more about her powers and gain control over her magic.

A Discovery of Witches focuses largely on the co-existence of creatures in a world of humans. It questions the origin of all supernatural species, drawing on alchemical and historic sources for reference.

== Plot ==
When Diana Bishop returns to Oxford University, her life is flipped upside down. While researching in the library, Diana requests a book called Ashmole 782. This manuscript, also known as the Book of Life, has been missing for over 150 years. As soon as Diana touches the ancient manuscript, her powers are activated. Frightened by her clear cosmic connection to Ashmole 782, Diana returns the book. It appears, however, that her discovery had already caught the attention of other creatures, which results in a series of events that slowly brings her witch heritage and family back into her life.

Matthew Clairmont is a vampire who has spent at least 150 years looking for that book. When word travels that the book is in Oxford, he races over expecting to see the book, but instead, he encounters Diana Bishop. Matthew's vampiric protective instincts set in, and he makes it his responsibility to ensure Diana's safety. As the story progresses, a forbidden romance starts to bloom between the vampire and the witch.

== Background ==
According to Harkness, the novel began as "a thought experiment" after she noticed the plethora of novels surrounding vampires and magic at an airport bookshop. As a historian, she noted that people today were interested in reading about the same sorts of subjects as they would have in the past, including the supernatural. "In some ways I think their popularity right now is about our feeling that we still want there to be magic and enchantment in the world," theorizes Harkness. "Magic provides a way of still having room for possibilities, an unlimited sense of what the world offers. Magic is always there when science is found wanting." Harkness has studied magic and the occult, which provided much of the inspiration for the novel, since 1983.

The writing of the novel took place in the early mornings "in the blissful quiet before [she] switched on [her] email" while she also continued teaching at the University of Southern California during the day and blogging about wine in the evenings. Aside from Anne Rice novels that she "read and loved" in her twenties, Harkness claims she has not read other vampire fiction such as The Historian or the Twilight series. Some elements of this novel sprang directly from Harkness' own life: she has spent many hours engaged in research in the Bodleian Library, and in the course of her own research, Harkness discovered an ancient – and long-lost – book of spells, the Book of Soyga.

Harkness drew primarily on her academic work as a historian of science. There are vast references to real alchemical processes as well as a multitude of historical figures, particularly from the Medieval and Renaissance periods. Furthermore, the inclusion of Elias Ashmole and his collection of rare alchemical manuscripts give the novel a solid historical foundation. Ashmole 782 is a real alchemical text that is missing from the Ashmole collection.

== Publication history ==
A Discovery of Witches first achieved attention from publishers at the 2009 Frankfurt Book Fair. It was then published by Viking Press for a North American release in February 2011. The novel was commercially successful, debuting at number two in Hardcover Fiction on the New York Times Best Seller list, and number eight on the USA Today Best-Selling Booklist. Two months after publication, A Discovery of Witches was already in its seventh printing.

== Critical reception ==
The novel was generally praised and deemed a strong literary debut. Rating the novel a B+, Entertainment Weekly's Karen Valby was positive in her review, labeling it an "extraordinarily fun debut" and remarking that "Harkness writes with thrilling gusto about the magical world. Whether she's describing a yoga class for witches, daemons, and vampires or Diana's benignly haunted house, it's a treat to suspend disbelief." Though she thought the novel dragged for a bit, "the pages turned faster, almost as if on their own" as the action picked up and "by the most satisfying end, Harkness had made me a believer." Parade gave the novel a glowing endorsement, writing, "Harkness’ sure hand when it comes to star-crossed love and chilling action sequences in striking locales makes for an enchanting debut." O, The Oprah Magazine listed "A Discovery of Witches" as one of its 15 Books to Watch for in February 2011, deeming it "romantic, erudite, and suspenseful" and noting "Harkness attends to every scholarly and emotional detail with whimsy, sensuality, and humor." In a starred review, Library Journal judged "A Discovery of Witches" to be an "enchanting novel... an essential purchase" and that Harkness "is an author to watch". On the novel, the review elaborated: "readers will find themselves invested in Diana’s success at unlocking the secrets of the manuscript. Although not a nail-biting cliffhanger, the finale skillfully provides a sense of completion while leaving doors open for the possibility of wonderful sequel adventures. This reviewer, for one, hopes they come soon!"

Critics praised Harkness' attention to detail and history, rare in paranormal romance novels. The San Antonio Express-News described it as a "rare historical novel that manages to be as intelligent as it is romantic [and] it is supernatural fiction that those of us who usually prefer to stay grounded in reality can get caught up in." Nisi Shawl of The Seattle Times noted that "though the quality of 'Discovery's' prose remains no more than clear and serviceable, its erudite references to the leather-bound boards of incunabular and secret ingredients in medieval inks make it a welcome relief." Margot Adler of NPR called A Discovery of Witches "a tour de force, an artful and unusually skilled blending of hard science, history and the supernatural." A 'Best Book of the Month' for February 2011, Amazon.com described the novel as "a mesmerizing and addictive read, equal parts history and magic, romance and suspense... This smart, sophisticated story harks back to the novels of Anne Rice, but it is as contemporary and sensual as the Twilight series with an extra serving of historical realism."

In a more mixed review for The Guardian, Jenny Turner panned the quality of the writing but admitted the ideas were interesting: "This is a very silly novel. Characters and relationships are stereotyped. The historical background is a total pudding. The prose is terrible. And yet, the ideas have just enough suction, somehow, to present an undemanding reader with some nice frissons." Elizabeth Hand, writing for The Washington Post, criticized the subject matter and wrote that "this novel's pacing is so torpid that readers may feel that aged, too."

Comparisons have been made between "A Discovery of Witches" and other popular fantasy series — namely Twilight, in the dynamics of Diana and Matthew's relationship, and Harry Potter in the co-existence of magical and non-magical creatures. It has been referred to as "Harry Potter for grown-ups." The novel was also compared to the work of Diana Gabaldon. Harkness said that she is a huge fan of Gabaldon and sees the comparisons as flattering.

== Adaptations ==
=== Film ===
Warner Bros. purchased the film rights to A Discovery of Witches in 2011. The film was in the early stages of development, with few details released beyond the signing-on of playwright David Auburn to pen the screenplay and producers Denise Di Novi and Allison Greenspan who have worked on Little Women, Sisterhood of the Traveling Pants and Practical Magic.

=== Television ===
British entertainment channel Sky One bought the rights for the books to adapt them into a television series. Teresa Palmer was cast as Diana Bishop and Matthew Goode was cast as Matthew Clairmont. Filming was completed on February 16, 2018. The program premiered in the UK on Sky One on September 14, 2018, with its first series of eight episodes. On November 2, 2018, Sky One renewed A Discovery of Witches for a second and a third series.The author, Deborah Harkness, has said that it would likely not be renewed for more seasons due to her desire to focus on continuing the book series.

== Historical and literary references ==
- Elias Ashmole
- Pope Sylvester II, originally known as Gerbert of Aurillac
- Charles Darwin, primarily On the Origin of Species
- Thomas Bodley
- Ben Jonson
- John Milton
- Christopher Marlowe
- Philosopher's stone
- Joseph Needham
- Filius philosophorum
- Diana (mythology)
- Order of Saint Lazarus
- Robert Hooke
- Isaac Newton
- Salem witch trials
- Halley's Comet
- Niccolò Machiavelli
- Black Death
- Siege of Carthage (c. 149–146 BC)
- Knights Templar
- Elizabeth I
- The Consolation of Philosophy
- Book of Genesis
- Pedanius Dioscorides
- Bernard of Clairvaux
- Eliot Ness and Al Capone
- George Chapman, The Shadow of Night
- Aurora consurgens
