= 1554 in poetry =

This article covers 1554 in poetry. Remove Empty Sections Nationality words link to articles with information on the nation's poetry or literature (for instance, Irish or France).

== Works published ==
=== France ===
- Pierre de Ronsard:
  - Bocage
  - Meslanges
- Hugh Salel, Tombeau poétique de Hugues Salel a posthumous edition prepared by Olivier de Magny of Salel's translation of Books 11 and 12 of the Iliad of Homer; Paris: Vincent Sertenas

=== Great Britain ===
- Miles Huggarde, The Assault of the Sacrament of the Altar, written 1549; non-elite opposition to the Reformation
- Henry Howard, Earl of Surrey, The Fourthe Boke of Virgill, Intreating of the Love Betweene Aeneas & Dido (see also Certain Bokes 1557)
- Sir David Lyndsay (also spelled "David Lindsay"), The Monarche, includes other works by the author

=== Other ===
- Giraldi Cinthio, Discoursi intorno al comporre dei romanzi, commedie, e tragedie ("Discourses on Composing Romances, Comedies, and Tragedies"), Italian criticism
- Friedrich Dedekind, Grobiana, an enlarged version of Grobianus, a poem written by a German in Latin elegiac verse first published in 1549; enormously popular across Continental Europe (see also Grobianus et Grobiana: sive, de morum simplicitate, libri tres 1558)
- Longinus, Dionysi Longini rhetoris praestantissimi liber de grandi sive sublimiorationis genere ... cum adnotationibus, ("On the Sublime"), first modern edition published by Francis Robortello in Basel, Switzerland

== Births ==
Death years link to the corresponding "[year] in poetry" article:

- Bálint Balassi (died 1594), Hungarian lyric poet
- Sir Philip Sidney (died 1586), English poet and scholar
- Fulke Greville, 1st Baron Brooke (died 1628), Elizabethan poet, dramatist, and statesman

== Deaths ==
Birth years link to the corresponding "[year] in poetry" article:

- Gutierre de Cetina (born 1519), Spanish poet and soldier
- Robert Wedderburn died about this year (born c. 1510), Scottish

== See also ==
- Poetry
- 16th century in poetry
