= 1558 in poetry =

Nationality words link to articles with information on the nation's poetry or literature (for instance, Irish or France).

== Events ==
- Elizabeth I ascends the throne of England

== Works published ==
- Joachim du Bellay, France:
  - Des Antiquités de Rome ("Antiquities of Rome")
  - Les Regrets, melancholy satire, a sonnet sequence, including "Heureux qui comme Ulysse"
  - Divers Jeux Rustiques
  - Poésies latines
- Friedrich Dedekind, Grobianus et Grobiana: sive, de morum simplicitate, libri tres, a poem written by a German in Latin elegiac verse; enormously popular across Continental Europe (an enlarged version of Grobiana of 1554, which was in turn an enlarged version of Grobianus 1549)
- Giovanni Della Casa; Italy:
  - Lyric Poems
  - Galateo
- Abdurahmon Mushfiqi, Diviani Mataibat, satires, Tajik

== Births ==
Death years link to the corresponding "[year] in poetry" article:

- October 24 – Szymon Szymonowic born (died 1629), Polish humanist, poet and playwright, called "the Polish Pindar"
- Also:
  - Abraham Fraunce, born this year or 1560, (died 1593), English poet
  - Robert Greene (died 1592), English author best known today for his pamphlet containing a polemic attack on William Shakespeare
  - Thomas Kyd (died 1594), English dramatist and poet
  - Thomas Lodge (died 1625), English dramatist and writer of the Elizabethan and Jacobean periods
  - Chidiock Tichborne (died 1586), English conspirator and poet
  - William Warner (died 1609), English poet
  - Dinko Zlatarić (died 1613), Croatian poet and translator

== Deaths ==
Birth years link to the corresponding "[year] in poetry" article:

- Mellin de Saint-Gelais (born 1491), French poet of the Renaissance and Poet Laureate of Francis I of France
- Francisco Sa de Miranda (born 1495), Portuguese
- Cassandra Fedele, (born 1465), Italian, Latin-language poet

== See also ==
- Poetry
- 16th century in poetry
- 16th century in literature
- Dutch Renaissance and Golden Age literature
- Elizabethan literature
- French Renaissance literature
- Renaissance literature
- Spanish Renaissance literature
