= Henry Willobie =

Henry Willobie (or Willoughby) (1575? – 1596?) is the ostensible author of a 1594 verse novella called Willobie His Avisa (in modern spelling, Willoughby's Avisa), a work that is of interest primarily because of its possible connection with William Shakespeare's life and writings.

== Life and work ==
Henry Willobie was the second son of a Wiltshire gentleman of the same name. He matriculated from St John's College, Oxford in December 1591 at the age of sixteen, and is probably the same Henry Willobie who graduated with a Bachelor of Arts from Exeter College, Oxford early in 1595. He published Willobie his Avisa in 1594.

Willobie may have died before 30 June 1596, when a new edition of Willobie his Avisa was published with the addition of an "Apologie" by Hadrian Dorrell, a friend of the author, which describes him as "now of late gone to God." Dorrell alleges that he found the manuscript of Willobie his Avisa among his friend's papers, which were left in his charge when Willobie departed from Oxford on Her Majesty's service. There is no trace of any Hadrian Dorrell in the historical record, and the name may be a pseudonym, perhaps even for Willobie himself.

Several authors have suggested that Willobie was not the real author of the poem. Arthur Acheson suggested that Matthew Roydon may have been the author, arguing that the poem obliquely described Shakespeare's relationship to Jane Davenant, the mother of William Davenant, who later hinted that he was Shakespeare's son. Roydon's authorship was later tentatively endorsed by G. B. Harrison, and reasserted by Christopher Hill. M. C. Bradbrook argued that it was a collaborative work written by Walter Raleigh's circle, the so-called School of Night, with which Roydon was associated.

Willobie his Avisa was extremely popular, and passed through numerous editions. In 1596 a writer called Peter Colse produced a replicate named Penelope's Complaint.

== Connection with Shakespeare ==
Willobie his Avisa was licensed for the press by printer John Windet on 3 September 1594. In the printed text, the poem is preceded by two commendatory poems, the second of which, signed "Contraria Contrariis; Vigilantius; Dormitanus," contains a reference to Shakespeare's poem The Rape of Lucrece, published four months previously:

"Yet Tarquyne pluckt his glistering grape,
And Shake-speare paints poore Lucrece rape."

This is the earliest known printed allusion to Shakespeare by name (aside from the title pages of Venus and Adonis and Lucrece).

The poem itself concerns a female character, Avisa (whose name is explained in Dorrell's "Epistle to the Reader" as an acronym for Amans Uxor Inviolata Semper Amanda). Avisa tells a story alternately with her suitors, one of whom is introduced to the reader in a prose interlude signed by the author as "Henrico Willobego Italo Hispalensis". This passage contains a reference which may be to Shakespeare. It runs as follows ('H.W.' refers to Willobie, and 'A' to Avisa):

"H. W. being suddenly infected with the contagion of a fantastical fit, at the first sight of A, ... bewrayeth the secresy of his disease unto his familiar frend W. S., who not long before had tried the courtesy of the like passion, and was now newly recovered ... he determined to see whether it would sort to a happier end for this new actor, than it did for the old player." (spelling modernized)

Then follows a dialogue between H. W. and W. S., in which the latter gives somewhat commonplace advice to the disconsolate wooer.

The use of the word "actor" and "player" in connection with the initials 'W.S.' is suggestive that the latter may refer to Shakespeare. If so, and if the poem is autobiographical, it implies that Willobie was in love with a woman who had been previously involved with Shakespeare.

== See also ==
- 1594 in poetry
