= Royden =

Royden may refer to

== People ==
=== Surname ===
- Halsey Royden (1928–1993), American mathematician
- Marmaduke Roydon or Royden (1583–1646), English merchant-adventurer and colonial planter, also a Royalist army officer
- Maude Royden (1876–1956), English preacher and suffragist
- Thomas Royden (disambiguation), several people

=== Given name ===
- Royden Barrie (1890–1948), pseudonym of Rodney Bennett, father of British composer Richard Rodney Bennett
- Royden B. Davis (1923/1924–2002), American academic administrator
- Royden G. Derrick (1915–2009), American industrialist and general authority of The Church of Jesus Christ of Latter-day Saints
- Roy Dyson (Royden Patrick Dyson, born 1948), American politician
- Royden Ingham (1911–1999), American cyclist who competed at the 1932 Summer Olympics
- Royden Lam (born 1975), Hong Kong darts player
- Royden Loewen (born 1954), Canadian historian
- Royden Rabinowitch (born 1943), Canadian sculptor
- Roy Screech (Clive Royden Screech, born 1953), Anglican bishop
- Royden Yerkes (1881–1964). American Episcopal priest and theologian

== Other uses ==
- Royden baronets
- Royden Park, Frankby, within the Metropolitan Borough of Wirral, England
- Thomas Royden & Sons, a shipbuilding company in Liverpool 1818–1893

== See also ==
- Roydon (disambiguation)
