= 1594 in poetry =

This article covers 1594 in poetry. Nationality words link to articles with information on the nation's poetry or literature (for instance, Irish or France).

== Works published ==
=== England ===
- Richard Barnfield, The Affectionate Shepheard
- Richard Carew, Godfrey of Bulloigne; or, The Recouverie of Hierusalem, translated from the Italian of the first five books of Torquato Tasso's Gerusalemme Liberatta
- George Chapman, Skia Nyktos. The Shadow of Night, the first two words of the title are in Ancient Greek
- Henry Constable, Diana; or, The Excellent Conceitful Sonnets of H.C., the second edition of Diana (first edition 1592)
- Samuel Daniel, Delia and Rosamond Augmented; [with] Cleopatra, the third edition of Delia and of Rosamond; first edition of Cleopatra (see also Delia 1592)
- Michael Drayton:
  - Ideas Mirrour, 51 sonnets
  - Matilda (reprinted in an expanded version, with corrections, in The Tragicall Legend of Robert Duke of Normandy 1596)
  - Peirs Gaveston Earle of Cornwall
- Robert Greene:
  - Orlando Furioso, published anonymously
  - See also Thomas Lodge and Robert Greene, below
- Thomas Heywood, Oenone and Paris
- Sir David Lyndsay, Squire Meldrum, also contains The testament of the nobill and vailzeand Squyer Williame Meldrum of the Bynnis
- Thomas Lodge and Robert Greene, A Looking Glasse, for London and Englande
- Thomas Lodge, The Wounds of Civill War, Lively Set Forth in the True Tragedies of Marius and Scilla, in verse and prose
- Thomas Morley, Madrigalls to Foure Voyces, verse and music
- John Mundy, editor, Songs and Psalms
- William Shakespeare, The Rape of Lucrece, as Lucrece, dedicated to Henry Wriothesley, third earl of Southampton; likely printed from the author's own manuscript; reprinted seven times by 1640
- Thomas Storer, Life and Death of Cardinal Wolsey
- Henry Willobie, alternate spellings "Henry Willoby" and "Henry Willoughby", an unidentified author, Willobie His Avisa, the book has a possible association with Shakespeare's sonnets

=== Other ===
- Torquato Tasso, Le sette giornate, Italy
- Jacob Spanmuller, also known as "Jacobus Pontanus", Poeticae institutiones, criticism

== Births ==
Death years link to the corresponding "[year] in poetry" article:

- March 25 – Maria Tesselschade Visscher (died 1649), Dutch
- September 30 – Antoine Gérard de Saint-Amant (died 1661), French
- Also:
  - John Chalkhill, birth year uncertain (died 1642), English
  - James Howell, birth year uncertain (died 1666), English pamphleteer and poet
  - Jacques de Serisay (died 1653), French poet and the founding director of the Académie française

== Deaths ==
Birth years link to the corresponding "[year] in poetry" article:

- c. February 7 – Barnabe Googe (born 1540), English pastoral poet and translator
- May 30 – Bálint Balassi (born 1554), Hungarian lyric poet
- August 15 (bur.) – Thomas Kyd (born 1558), English dramatist and poet
- November 29 – Alonso de Ercilla (born 1533), Spanish

== See also ==
- Poetry
- 16th century in poetry
- 16th century in literature
- Dutch Renaissance and Golden Age literature
- Elizabethan literature
- English Madrigal School
- French Renaissance literature
- Renaissance literature
- Spanish Renaissance literature
- University Wits
