= A. E. Ellis (author) =

British novelist and playwright

A.E. Ellis was the pseudonym used by Derek Lindsay (1920–2000), a British novelist and playwright, to publish his novel, The Rack, and to write two plays, Grand Manouevres and Seagull Rising. Lindsay/Ellis was orphaned as a child and served in the British army in World War II. After the war he went to the University of Oxford and was diagnosed with tuberculosis and was treated in a sanatorium in the French Alps, one of the last people to undergo this form of therapy. The Rack is a detailed account of the experience and received high acclaim when it was published in 1958, from Graham Greene and Anthony Burgess and others. It was favourably compared with The Magic Mountain and has been in print ever since. However, it was the only novel Ellis published. Although there was said to be an unpublished novel left after his death, this has never appeared, although a "restored edition" of The Rack, with passages removed from the first edition by its editor, James Michie, re-inserted, has been published.

Poems under his own name were published in Poetry Quarterly edited by Wrey Gardiner in the 1940s. He also wrote at least two plays. Grand Manouevres, about the Dreyfus Affair, was produced at the National Theatre in 1974 and received a hostile reception, while Seagull Rising, inspired by Chekhov, was put on at The Questors Theatre in 1977. A short story, "The Dormouse Child", appeared in The London Magazine of 1957 and another, "The Sheep Counter", in the April 1959 edition. He was described as "saturnine and reclusive", but had many friends, including Graham Greene, who compared The Rack with Ulysses in importance, Kenneth Tynan and Andrew Sinclair, who both wrote about him and Cyril Connolly. He had a son, Timon, with Marianne Sinclair, Andrew Sinclair's first wife.

== Notes ==
- Alan Wall: introduction to Zephyr Books edition of The Rack.
- Andrew Sinclair: introduction to Valancourt Books edition of The Rack.
- Andrew Sinclair: London Magazine, Volume 41, Issues 1-2. 2001
- Meyers, Jeffrey (2019). "A. E. Ellis and The Rack: An Unpublished Letter". Style. 53 (1): 79. doi:10.5325/style.53.1.0079.
