= The Shadow of Night =

Poem

The Shadow of Night is a long poem written by George Chapman; it was first published in 1594, in an edition printed by Richard Field for William Ponsonby, the prestigious publisher of Edmund Spenser and Sir Philip Sidney.

The poem was Chapman's first significant literary work; it is furnished with abundant notes and references to classical Greek and Roman authors (41 in total, drawn from the Mythologiae of Conti). The title page of the first edition gives the title in both English and Greek (Σκία νυκτός, "Skia nyktos"). The poem's reception as an important development in English verse established Chapman's initial literary reputation, which he would later expand and deepen with his subsequent poems, plays, and translations.

Chapman dedicated the work, which he calls a "poor and strange trifle," to fellow poet Matthew Roydon. The dedication contrasts superficial readers, who read verse to "curtail a tedious hour," with those few who "entertained learning in themselves, to the vital warmth of freezing science...." He names three prominent noblemen of the day, "ingenious Darby, deep-searching Northumberland, and skill-embracing heir of Hunsdon...." These were Ferdinando Stanley, 5th Earl of Derby, well known as the patron of the acting company Lord Strange's Men; Henry Percy, 9th Earl of Northumberland, the so-called "Wizard Earl;" and George Carey, who succeeded his father as Lord Hunsdon in 1596 and as Lord Chamberlain of England in 1597. Carey served as the patron of the Lord Chamberlain's Men, the acting company of William Shakespeare.

The three noblemen and their associates, like Sir Walter Raleigh, John Dee and Thomas Harriot among others, have been interpreted as members of a clique of advanced thinkers called The School of Night, who were interested in promoting new ideas like the Copernican and Galilean view of a heliocentric solar system, and the spirit of open inquiry that underlay it. Chapman has been seen by some as the Rival Poet of Shakespeare's sonnets.

The work as a whole treats the theme of inspired melancholy, the concept that "melecholia" is not merely a negative state, but rather allows for deep and searching thought, self-examination, and study of the world. While humans often devote their daylight hours to trivial distractions, the night allows serious contemplation. Critics have linked the poem to a strain of abstruse and esoteric Renaissance thought on "Saturnian" melancholy. "No pen can anything eternal write, / That is not steep'd in humor of the night" (lines 376–7).

The poem is divided into two parts, the Hymnus in Noctem and the Hymnus in Cynthiam. The first section of the poem appeals to Night as a primordial goddess, in the spirit of the hymns of Orpheus. In the poem's second half, the portrait of the moon goddess Cynthia represents Queen Elizabeth I, and comprises the type of hagiographic personification that was common in the later Elizabethan era.

Algernon Charles Swinburne noted that though it is his first published poem, The Shadow of Night already expresses Chapman's sense of rejection; Swinburne described the poem as "full of loud and angry complaints of neglect and slight, endured at the hands of an unthankful and besotted generation." The poem appears to contain an autobiographical reference, indicating that Chapman served in a military campaign in the Dutch Republic under Sir Francis Vere, in the 1591-2 period. Part of the poem was written about the siege of Knodsenburg just outside of Nijmegen that took place between 15 and 25 July 1591. There Vere helped defeat the Spanish force under the Duke of Parma:

and when th'Italian duike, a troupe of horse

Sent out in hast against some English force
From statelie sited sconce-torn Nimigan
Vnder whose walles the Wall most Cynthian
Stretch her siluer limms loded with wealth
Hearing our horse were marching downe by stealth

The modern composer Harrison Birtwistle composed an orchestral piece (2001) which he titled The Shadow of the Night after Chapman's poem.

== See also ==
- 1594 in poetry
