= The Phoenix Nest =

1593 anthology of poetry

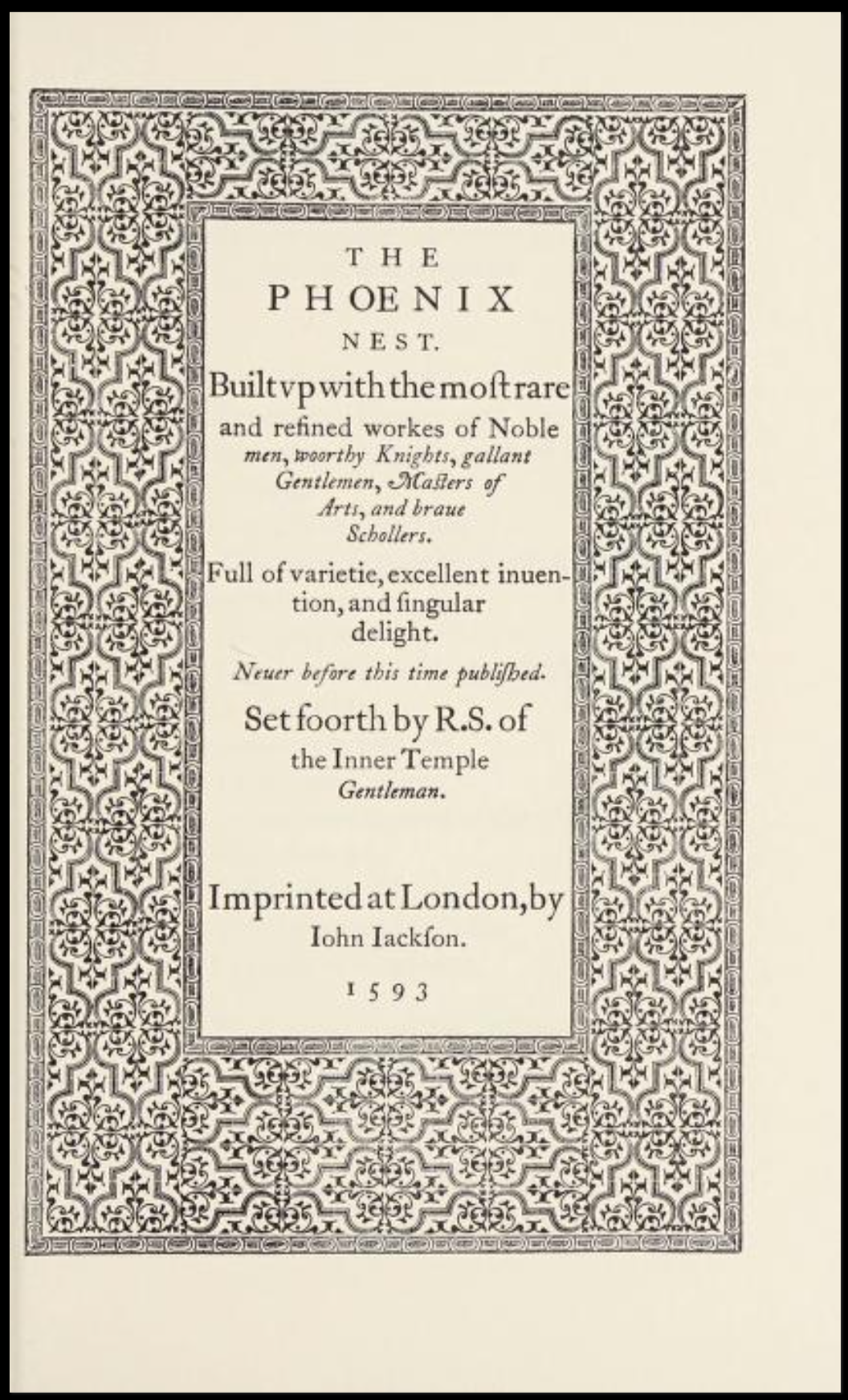
- Title page
- Author: Various
- Genre: Poetry
- Publication date: 1953
- ISBN: 9780854179923

The Phoenix Nest (sometimes written as Phœnix Nest, and sometimes including a possessive apostrophe after the "x") was an anthology of poetry by various authors which was "set foorth" by an as-yet unidentified "R. S. of the Inner Temple Gentleman", in 1593 (possibly Ralph Starkey, known as Infortunio, who had contributed a dedicatory verse to Edmund Spenser's Faerie Queene in 1590. The Old DNB describes him as a transcriber and collector). The title page identifies fourteen of the pieces contained therein, although there a total of seventy-nine poems, as well as three short prose pieces.

It was the first to show the influence of the new life and vigour of such compilations. The Phoenix Nest is dedicated, as it were, to the memory of Robert Dudley, 1st Earl of Leicester, and opens with three elegies upon Astrophel (i.e. Sir Philip Sidney). The volume contains poems by certain anonymous writers who clearly belong to the old, rather than to the new, school of poets. And, in the main, N. B. Gent, as Nicholas Breton is here written, belongs to that school too. Identified writers who contributed to the volume include Edward de Vere, Edward Dyer, Robert Greene, Thomas Lodge, George Peele, Walter Raleigh, Mathew Roydon, William Smith, and Thomas Watson.

In The Phoenix Nest, Breton indulges very freely in the old allegory, a heritage from the Middle Ages which was soon to fall out of use. A strange description of a rare garden plot is an allegorical poem in "poulter’s measure." An excellent dreame of ladies, and their riddles and The Chesse Play are, also, allegorical. The new note is struck most forcibly by Lodge. The fifteen poems by Lodge which the volume includes are the best of its treasures. Three of them are from his Phillis (1593), a volume of eclogues, sonnets, elegies and other lyrical pieces; the rest appeared first in The Phoenix Nest, though one, "Like desart woods", is published in Englands Helicon, where it is given either to Dyer, or to "Ignoto." It is worth noticing that Lodge, in one song, "The fatall starre that at my birthday shined," makes use of a metre which might be scanned as, and is clearly modelled upon, alcaics, but is, in practice, composed of iambic feet.

The Earl of Oxford has a charming lyric, "What cunning can expresse," and it is possible that the longest poem in the volume, A most rare and excellent dreame, is the work of Greene. The dream is the favourite one of the visit of a lady to her sleeping lover. Her beauties are described and his parlous state explained. Then follows a long argument on love, of the kind that had not yet passed out of fashion; and, on the relenting of his mistress, the lover wakes. There is much of the old school in the matter, but little in the manner. The stanzas in rime royal move freely and strongly, and the whole is a good specimen of the poetry of the time. It needs, however, only to place it side by side with such a lyric as Lodge’s "My bonnie Lasse thine eie," in the same volume, to realise the immensely enlarged field in which the poet had to work. "Sweete Violets (Loves paradice) that spred" is a good example of the long stanza of complicated structure and involved rime-sequence which the poets of the day used with rare skill, and which led the way in time to the formal ode.
