= A Visit to Aesculapius =

Painting by Edward Poynter

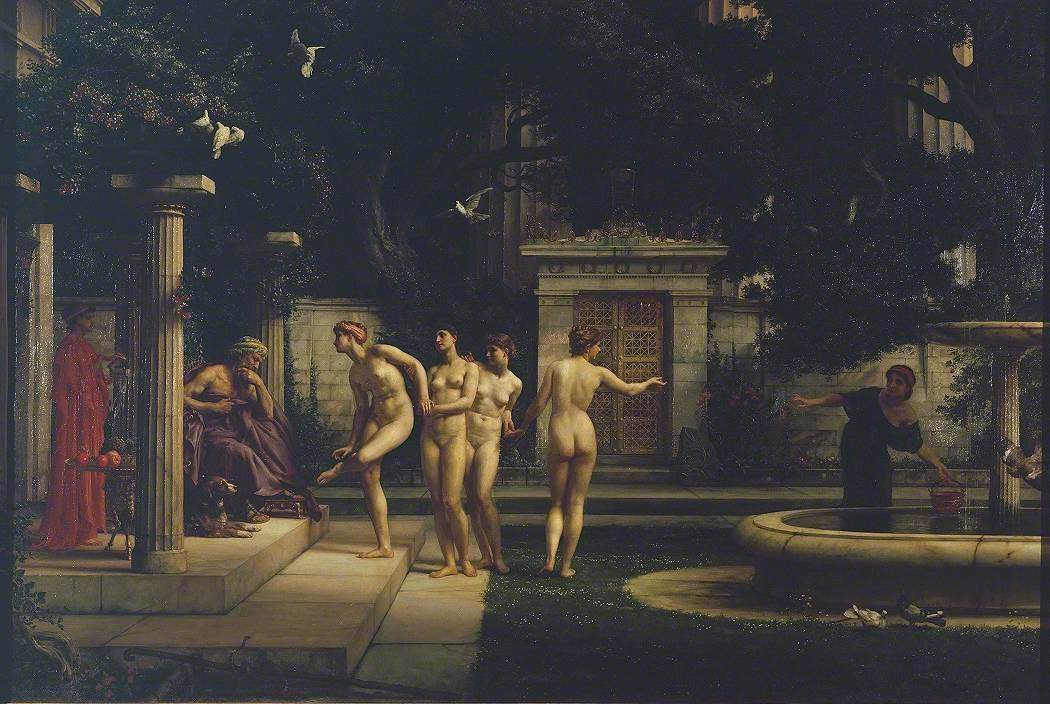
- Artist: Edward Poynter
- Year: 1880
- Medium: Oil on canvas, history painting
- Dimensions: 151.1 cm × 228.6 cm (59.5 in × 90.0 in)
- Location: Tate Britain, London

A Visit to Aesculapius is an oil on canvas history painting by the British artist Edward Poynter, from 1880. It is in the Tate Britain, in London.

== Description ==
It depicts a scene from a poem by the Elizabethan writer Thomas Watson, inspired by Greek mythology. Asclepius, the god of medicine and healing, is visited by Venus who has a thorn in her foot. She is accompanied by her handmaidens, the three Graces. They all appear completely naked. The scene takes place at night; Asclepius is seated in a chair and appears thoughtful. A dog lies by his side, and a man dressed in red is at the left. One of the Graces, with her back to the viewer, is seen addressing a woman who came fill her bucket with water from a fountain, at the right. Several doves, which are attributes of Venus, appear in the scene.

The painting was displayed at the Royal Academy's Summer Exhibition of 1880 at Burlington House in London. It was acquired for the nation as part of the Chantrey Bequest.

== Bibliography ==
- Becker, Edwin. Sir Lawrence Alma-Tadema. Rizzoli, 1997.
- Smith, Alison. The Victorian Nude: Sexuality, Morality, and Art. Manchester University Press, 1996.
- Wood, Christopher. Olympian Dreamers: Victorian Classical Painters, 1860-1914. Constable, 1983.
