= Thomas Achelley =

English poet and playwright

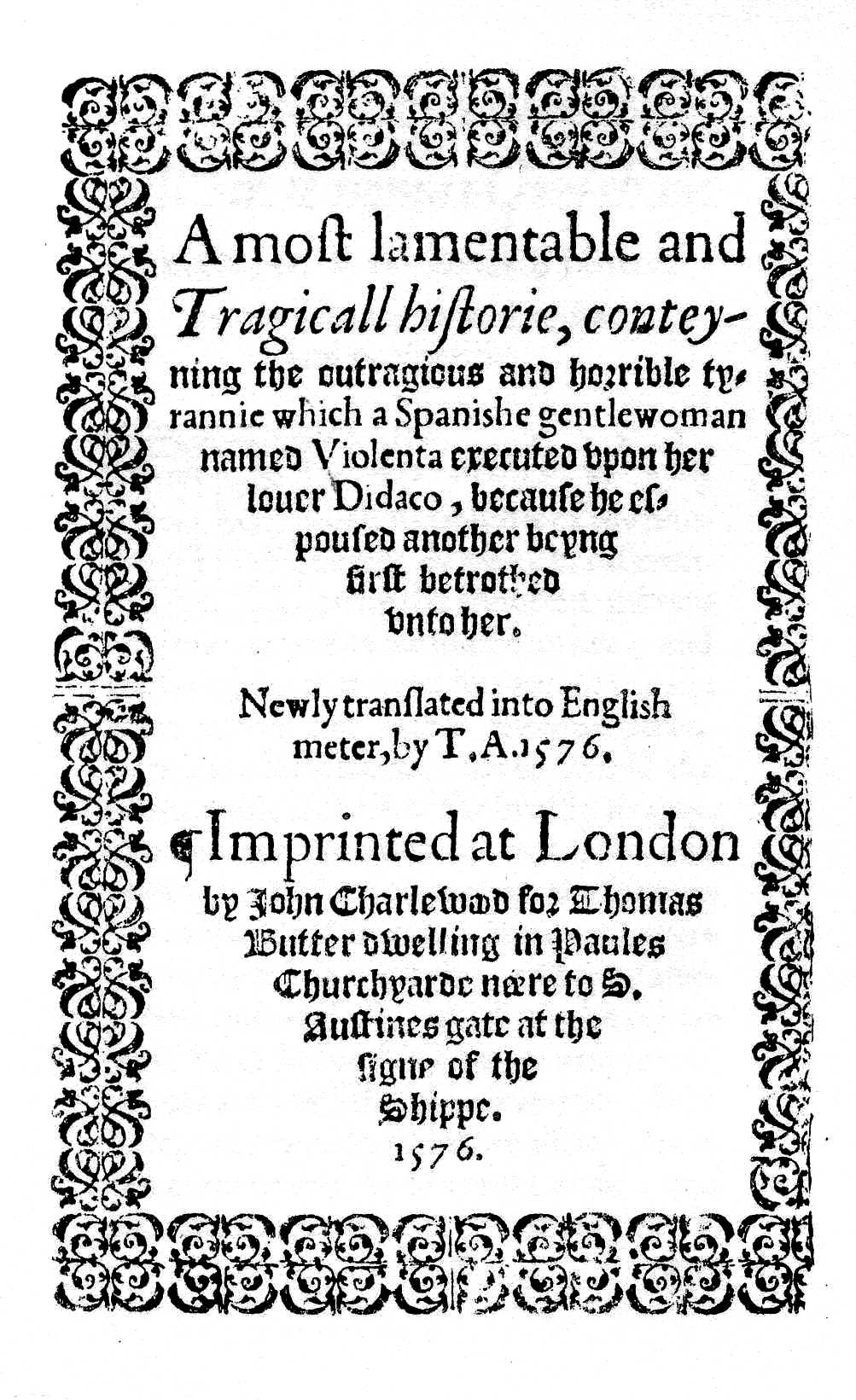
Title page of Lamentable Historie of Violenta & Didaco (1576)

Thomas Achelley, also Achlow or Atchelow (f. 1568–1595, d. before 1600) was an English poet and playwright of the Elizabethan era. Though little of his work survives, in his own time he had a considerable reputation.

== Life and reputation ==
Nothing is known of Achelley's family. Several contemporaries grouped him with Oxford alumni, but he is not recorded by any school or university. On 6 March 1587, "Thomas Achelley of London, Gentleman", was surety along with James Peele for a £30 loan from Daniel Balgay, a London mercer, to George Peele.

Achelley wrote plays for the Queen's Men, but none survive. In his A Knight's Conjuring (1607), Thomas Dekker places the player John Bentley (1553–85) among a company of deceased playwrights, Thomas Watson, Thomas Kyd, and Achelley. Dekker writes that Bentley, one of the leading actors of the Queen's Men, "had bene a Player, molded out of their pennes".

Thomas Nashe mentions Achelley in his preface to Robert Greene’s Menaphon (1589), "To The Gentlemen Students Of Both Universities" in company with Mathew Roydon and George Peele as one of the most able men of London able to revive poetry, saying that he "hath more than once or twise manifested, his deepe witted schollership in places of credit". Achelley is compared with Italian poets by Francis Meres in his Palladis Tamia: "As Italy had Dante, Boccace, Petrarch, Tasso, Celiano, and Ariosto; so England had Matthew Roydun, Thomas Atchelow, Thomas Watson, Thomas Kid, Robert Greene, and George Peele" (fol. 282).

The preface of Bel-vedére, or the garden of the Muses (1600) lists him as one of a group of deceased contributors.

== Extant works ==
- The key of knovvledge. Contayning sundry godly prayers and meditations, very necessary to occupy the mindes of well disposed persons (ca. 1572). London: William Seres. STC 85a. Dedicated to Lady Elizabeth Russell, the second daughter of Francis Russell, 2nd Earl of Bedford. A 17-year (1572–88) almanac with prayers and meditations.
- "Cupidinis et Psychis nuptiae heroicó carmine donatae" ("The Wedding of Cupid and Psyche"), unpublished holographic Latin poem in 233 verses (27 pages) dated 1573, based on William Adlington's translation of The Golden Ass. Dedicated to Alexander Nowell, the Dean of St. Paul's from 1560 to 1602. MS Eng 1277. Houghton Library, Harvard University.
- A most lamentable and tragicall historie, conteyning the outragious and horrible tyrannie which a Spanishe gentlewoman named Violenta executed vpon her louer Didaco, because he espoused another beyng first betrothed vnto her. Newly translated into English meter, by T.A. (1576) London: Thomas Butter. STC 1356.4. Printed by John Charlewood for Thomas Butter, and dedicated to Sir Thomas Gresham. Not a translation, but a poem based on William Painter's prose story in his Palace of Pleasure (1566).
- "To the author" in Thomas Watson's The Ekatompathia, or passionate centurie of love (1582). London: Gabriel Cawood. STC 25118a. Commendatory poem, 12 lines.
- Robert Allott's Englands Parnassus (1600). London: Nicholas Ling, Cuthbert Burby, Thomas Hayes. STC 378–80. Allott attributes 13 fragments to Achelley, but two are by Thomas Lodge and one by Thomas Churchyard. Two of the remaining ten may be variants from Samuel Daniel and Thomas Kid. Those identified as Achelley's are 540, 547, 638, 833, 939, 1158, 1302, 1445, 1607, and 1786.
- John Bodenham's Bel-vedére, or the garden of the Muses (1600). London: Hugh Astley. STC 3189. Though Achelley is listed as a contributor, none of the quotations is signed.
