= William Watson (merchant) =

English merchant (died 1559)

- Born: Shropshire
- Died: 20 November 1559; London
- Occupation: merchant
- Years active: 1531–1559
- Spouses: First wife (unidentified); Jane Stanney; Anne Lee
- Children: with first wife: Barbara Watson; with Jane: John Watson; Blanche Watson; Anne Watson; with Anne: William Watson; Thomas Watson; Elizabeth Watson; Mawdelin Watson; Mary Watson; Elizabeth Watson
- Father: John Watson

William Watson (died 20 November 1559) was an English merchant and shipowner living in London in the reigns of Henry VIII, Edward VI, Mary I and Elizabeth I. He was the royal purchasing agent in the Baltic from 1538 to 1559, chiefly tasked with supplying the English fleet with masts, cordage and other naval stores.

== Early life ==
He was born in Shropshire, as the son of John Watson. He had two brothers, Richard and Roger and two sisters: Blanche (d. 1563), who married 1. Richard Reynolds (d. 6 May 1542); 2. Robert Palmer (d. 1544); 3. William Forman (d. 1546); and Elizabeth, who married Richard Mawdley.

== Career ==
Watson was a member of the Worshipful Company of Drapers. In 1538 Watson was appointed royal purchasing agent in the Baltic. He had been a Baltic merchant since at least 1531. His brothers, Richard and Roger worked with him. In 1544 William Watson wrote to Duke Albrecht of Prussia from Danzig: "My brother Richard asked me in a letter to send some English dogs to Your Grace. I have ordered some, and they have been put on board a vessel. Of these three one jumped overboard; the other two can be fetched from Jurgen Rudloff, the skinner. In case Your Grace wanted more, it would be well to let me know if You want them young or old. I shall then willingly order them." He also offered to procure court dresses or dress material for the Duke.

William's brother, Roger, who lived in Danzig and acted as his agent there, married, before 1550, Margarethe von Schwarzwald, the daughter of Hans von Schwarzwald (1468–1521), alderman of Danzig and his third wife, Margarethe von Reesen.

In 1546, through William Watson's mediation, Henry VIII negotiated with the Danzig city council for the purchase of masts, cordage and other naval stores and in 1558 Mary I negotiated with the king of Poland, Sigismund II Augustus, to allow Watson to export essential materials for the English fleet from Danzig free of customs duty.

William Watson was briefly succeeded as Crown agent in Danzig by John Borthwick in 1560 and then from 1561, the London leather merchant, Thomas Allen, who was later a member of the Eastland Company.

== Marriages ==
Watson married three times. By his first (unidentified) wife, he had a daughter:

- Barbara Watson, married Thomas Haselfoote.

His second wife was Jane Stanney (d. c. 1547), with whom he had a son and two daughters:

- John Watson (d. 19 Dec. 1574).
- Blanche Watson (d. 24 April 1593). Married 1. Dunstan Walton (d. 19 March, 1571); 2. (John) Lambert on 14 October 1572; 3. Thomas Skinner (d. 30 December 1596), Master of the Worshipful Company of Clothworkers, alderman and later Lord Mayor of London.
- Anne Watson (d.18 Oct. 1574), married Thomas Ducke on 5 March 1564.

His third wife, Anne Lee (d. 1561), was the daughter of Thomas Lee (d.1527) and Elizabeth Rolleston (d.1556), the daughter of Thomas Rolleston of Swarkestone in Derbyshire and widow of William Whitlock (d.1520). With Anne he had two sons and four daughters:

- William Watson (1553–12 Oct. 1624)
- Thomas Watson (1555–1592), poet and translator.
- Elizabeth Watson (d. 1582)
- Mawdelin Watson
- Mary Watson (b. 1557), married Robert Wylforde on 11 July 1575.
- Elizabeth Watson (b. 1559)

== Death ==
Watson made his will on 10 November and died at his home in Mark Lane, London on 20 November 1559. He was survived by his third wife, Anne, who died in 1561. His heir, William, was then aged "6 years 6 months and more."
