= Eneados =

1513 Middle Scots translation of the Aeneid

The Eneados is a translation into Middle Scots of Virgil's Latin Aeneid, completed by the poet and clergyman Gavin Douglas in 1513.

== Description ==
The title of Gavin Douglas' translation, Eneados, is given in the heading of a manuscript at Cambridge University, which refers to the "twelf bukis of Eneados". The title of the first printed edition (London, 1553) was The xiii Bukes of Eneados of the famose Poete Virgill.

The work was the first complete translation of a major classical text in the Scots language and the first successful example of its kind in any Anglic language. In addition to Douglas's version of Virgil's Aeneid, the work also contains a translation of the "thirteenth book" written by the fifteenth-century poet Maffeo Vegio as a continuation of the Aeneid. Douglas supplied original prologue verses for each of the thirteen books, and a series of concluding poems. There is also an incomplete commentary, covering only part of the first book, written as marginal notes (almost certainly in Douglas's own hand) in the Cambridge manuscript.

In the first (general) prologue Douglas compares the merits of Virgil and Chaucer as master poets and attacks the printer William Caxton for his inadequate rendering of a French translation of the Aeneid. He mentions that Henry Sinclair, 4th Lord Sinclair, was an inspiration for his translation. Sinclair may have known Gavin Douglas at the royal court.

== Critical reception ==
Douglas's reputation among modern readers was bolstered somewhat in 1934 when Ezra Pound included several passages of the Eneados in his ABC of Reading. Comparing Douglas to Chaucer, Pound wrote that "the texture of Gavin's verse is stronger, the resilience greater than Chaucer's". C. S. Lewis was also an admirer of the work: "About Douglas as a translator there may be two opinions; about his Aeneid (Prologues and all) as an English book there can be only one. Here a great story is greatly told and set off with original embellishments which are all good—all either delightful or interesting—in their diverse ways." Kenneth Rexroth called it "a spectacular poem", albeit one that "bears little relationship to the spirit of Virgil".

== Sample ==
Douglas translates the opening of the poem thus:

The batalis and the man I wil discrive,
Fra Troys boundis first that fugitive
By fait to Ytail come and cost Lavyne;
Our land and sey kachit with mekil pyne,
By fors of goddis abuse, from euery steid,
Of cruell Juno throu ald remembrit fede.
Gret pane in batail sufferit he alsso,
Or he his goddis brocht in Latio,
And belt the cite, fra quham, of nobill fame,
The Latyne pepill takyn heth thar name,
And eik the faderis, princis of Alba,
Cam, and the wallaris of gret Rome alswa.

== Manuscripts and editions ==
The principal early manuscripts of the Eneados are

- Cambridge MS (c. 1525), in the library of Trinity College, Cambridge
- Elphynstoun MS (before 1527), in the library of the University of Edinburgh
- Ruthven MS (c. 1535), also in the library of the University of Edinburgh
- Lambeth MS (1545–1546), in the library of Lambeth Palace. The poem was copied into this manuscript by Thomas Bellenden.
- Bath (or Longleat) MS (1547), in the Marquess of Bath's library at Longleat

The first printed edition appeared in London in 1553, from the press of William Copland. It displays an anti–Roman Catholic bias, in that references (in the prologues) to the Virgin Mary, Purgatory, and Catholic ceremonies are altered or omitted; in addition, 66 lines of the translation, describing the amour of Dido and Aeneas, are omitted as indelicate. The 1710 Edinburgh folio edited by Thomas Ruddiman, which includes a full glossary and a biography of Douglas by Bishop John Sage, is based on the 1553 edition and the Ruthven manuscript, perhaps with corrections from the Bath manuscript. The Bannatyne Club edition of 1839 is a printing of the Cambridge manuscript.

The standard modern edition of the Eneados is the four-volume Scottish Text Society edition by David F. C. Coldwell. The recent two-volume critical edition by Gordon Kendal regularises the spelling.

== See also ==
- 1553 in poetry
