= Willobie His Avisa =

1594 poem

- Title page of the first edition (1594)
- Author: Henry Willobie (possible pseudonym)
- Language: English
- Genre: narrative poetry
- Publisher: John Windet
- Publication date: 1594
- Publication place: England
- Media type: Print
- Followed by: Penelope's Complaint or a Mirror for Wanton Minions

Willobie His Avisa is a narrative poem that was published as a pamphlet in London after being entered in the Stationers' Register on 3 September 1594. It purports to have been written by a person called "Henry Willobie" with an introduction by "Hadrian Dorrell". It is possible that these are pseudonyms, though a real Henry Willobie certainly existed.

The central story tells of Avisa, who is at first a maid and then an innkeeper's wife. She is besieged by a series of would-be seducers, one after the other. She rebuffs each of them and remains a chaste and a constant wife. It is told in seventy-two cantos, the cantos being made up of six-line stanzas of iambic tetrameters, which rhyme ababcc.

The pedestrian quality of the poem has left critics unimpressed, and it was censured by the authorities in 1599. The work is enigmatic regarding the actual identities of its characters and its author, but its popularity suggests that Tudor audiences knew what was being said. It was republished six times between 1594 and 1635.

Willobie His Avisa is of particular interest to Shakespearean studies, because it contains literature's first extant, independent mention of William Shakespeare. This occurs in an introductory poem printed in the first pages. Also, one of the characters, "W.S.", is widely thought to be based on William Shakespeare. W.S. is presented as a friend to "H.W." (Henry Willobie), and offers him advice on wooing Avisa.

== The title page ==
The title page reads in full:

Willobie his Avisa. Or The true Picture of a modest Maid, and of a chaste and constant wife. In Hexamiter verse. The like argument whereof, was never heretofore published. Read the preface to the Reader before you enter farther. A vertuous woman is the crown of her husband, but she that maketh him ashamed, is as corruption in his bones. Proverb. 12.4. Imprinted at London by John Windet. 1594.

== Preface: two epistles and two poems ==
After the title page are two epistles: “To all the constant Ladies & Gentlewomen of England that fear God,” and “To the gentle & courteous Reader.” Both are ascribed to Hadrian Dorrell. In the second epistle, dated “From my chamber in Oxford this first of October,” Dorrell claims that he discovered the poem among the papers of his “very good friend and chamber fellow M. Henry Willobie,” a young man, and “a scholar of very good hope,” who has left for foreign lands, leaving with Dorrell “the key of his study, and the use of all his books till his returne.” Dorrell says that he ventured to publish this poem without the author’s consent.

Dorell then says, “Whether it be altogether fayned, or in some part true, or altogether true” he does not know, but he suspects that the name, Avisa, may have been invented as an acronym for the Latin words “Amans Uxor Inviolata Sempre Amanda”, which he translates: “A loving wife, that never violated her faith, is always to be beloved.” Willobie’s intention, Dorell guesses, may be simply to tell a story that sets out “the Idea of a constant wife” to let one type of woman know she can expect “glory & praise” and the others “blacke ignominy, and foule contempt”.

Dorrell then speculates alternatively that the poem may be based on actual examples, because he has discovered a note in Willobie's hand that says “Yet I would not have Avisa to be thought a politike fiction, nor a truethlesse invention.”

Dorrell ends his preface with an attack on writers of "lewd" tales, and by citing examples of chaste women.

These two epistles are followed by two poems that commend the poem to the reader. The second of these, "In praise of Willowbie his Avisa, Hexameton to the Author," is signed "Contraria Contrarijs: Vigilantius: Dormitanus.” This is the poem that contains the allusion to William Shakespeare:

Though Collatine have deerely bought,
To high renowne, a lasting life,
And found, that most in vaine have sought,
To have a Faire, and Constant wife,
Yet Tarquyne pluckt his glistering grape,
And Shake-speare, paints poor Lucrece rape.

== The tale: Avisa and the men who lust for her ==
Having followed the instruction on the title page by reading the preface, the tale of Avisa and her suitors begins. Avisa was born with “A face and eye that should entice” and “a flinty heart, that should endure all fierce assaults, and never yield.” She then confronts the men who would seduce her, and she rebuffs them all. First comes the Noblemen, who, if she will become his “secret friend”, offers her wealth and other benefits. Avisa repulses him, and then marries an innkeeper.

Avisa is then courted by the Cavaleiro, who is haughty and proud. Avisa calls his passion "filthy love", and tells him to go visit a brothel – more suited to his "beastly mind". His "wanne cheeks" cause her to fear "the pockes".

The next two men are D.B., an Englishman who has taken on the style and manners of a Frenchman, and a man named "Dydimus Harco Anglo Germanus", an Englishman who takes on a German style.

The last of this series of swains is H.W., who bears the name "Herico Willobego Italo-Hispalenis", which certainly recalls the name of the purported author. H.W. is portrayed as a passionate young man. As he is about to take his turn to persuade Avisa out of her chastity, he finds that he is "not able any longer to endure the burning heat of so fervent a humor", and so he "betrayeth the secrecy of his disease unto his familiar friend, W.S., who, not long before, had tried the curtesy of the like passion.”

W.S. appears to be familiar with Avisa, for he says he knows the "face from whence these flames arise". He then offers this encouraging rhyme: “She is no saint, she is no Nonne, I think in time she may be wonne.” He then advises his friend regarding the way to win Avisa’s favour. But the advice seems cynical and shallow, and the tone W.S. uses seems at times almost jokey. When the advice is followed, it proves disastrous. H.W. is so stricken in his failure that it is not known if he is alive or dead. This episode is followed by a stanza that hints that there is more that could be revealed:

But here I cease for fear of blame,
Although there be a great deal more,
That might be spoken of this dame
That yet lies hid in secret store,
If this be lik't, then can I say
Ye may see more another day.

== Post script: two short poems and an apology ==
The last pages of the pamphlet contain two short poems, “The resolution of a chaste and a constant wife, that minds to continue faithful unto her husband. To the tune of Fortune.” and “The praise of a contented mind.”

Two years after the first printing, a second edition was issued, in which "Hadrian Dorrell" added an "Apologie showing the true meaning of Willobie his Avisa". In this addition Dorrell contradicts his earlier claim by declaring that the story is entirely a poetic fiction that was written "thirty-five years since." The name "Avisa", he now claims, either means that the woman described had never been seen ("a" translated from Latin as "not" and "visa" as "seen"), or it was derived from the Latin for "bird". The author also indicates that there has been speculation regarding the meaning of Willobie his Avisa, and he uses this Apologie to add clues to further hint at the intended meaning and targets of this poem.

In this apology, "Dorrell" directs comments at "one P.C. (who seemeth to bee a Scholler)" and refers to an earlier pamphlet published in the same year (1596), Penelope's Complaint or a Mirror for Wanton Minions taken out of Homer's Odysea and written in English Verse by Peter Colse. This pamphlet is written in a verse form and style that is identical to Willobie his Avisa, and also the author, Peter Colse, has in common with Hadrian Dorrell that neither of their names can be found mentioned anywhere else in Elizabethan letters. In Penelope's Complaint "Colse" accuses Willobie his Avisa of slandering unnamed persons. Dorell's response in his "Apologie" is to claim innocence – Willobie his Avisa was mere fiction with no intended targets. Dorrell then mentions that the purported author, Willobie, had recently died.

== Additional controversy and considerations ==
In the eighteenth century scholars encountering Willobie His Avisa accepted it at face value as a simple morality tale, not noticing the signs that suggest there is something else going on, signs that include: Dorrell’s contradictions and explanations regarding how the book came to be discovered and printed, the suggestive use of initials, the censuring of the book, and the inexplicable popularity of what on the surface was a pedestrian morality tale. Such popularity suggests that Tudor readers may very well have known the identities as well as the intended mockery of the poem.

In the middle of the nineteenth century, critics began to see hidden meanings, including the identification of W.S. with William Shakespeare, and H.W. with Shakespeare's patron Henry Wriothesley, as well as the possibility that Willobie His Avisa was written as a libel intending to embarrass certain prominent Elizabethans.

Avisa's refusal of a number of suitors, who all bear various international styles and trappings, has suggested that poem is a Roman a clef and that the maiden, Avisa, may be intended to represent Queen Elizabeth. Queen Elizabeth's personal motto was Semper eadem, "always the same", and the chaste heroine of Willobie His Avisa signs five epistles either "Alwaies the same, Avisa" or "Alway the same, Auisa".

In an entry to the Stationers' Register dated 4 June 1599 following a list of books that have been burned, comes a note that "Willobies Adviso" is to be "Called in", which indicates the pamphlet was censured, assumedly by someone who was offended and could take that action. It was then able to be reissued after the death of Elizabeth in 1603.

== Author ==
There is a record of a Henry Willobie (1574–1596), who entered St John's College, Oxford, and later moved to Exeter College, completing his degree in 1595. There is a possible connection to Shakespeare through Willobie's older brother, William, who married Eleanor Bampfield. Eleanor's sister married Thomas Russell, who was later named as an overseer of Shakespeare's will, in which he was left £5. Willobie also had a younger brother called Thomas. In the second edition of the poem there are additional verses signed by "Thomas Willoby, Frater Henrici Willoby" ("Thomas Willoby, brother of Henry Willoby"), which is consistent with the historical Henry Willobie. However, nothing more is known about him, other than that he came from West Knoyle, Wiltshire.

The "Hadrian Dorrell" who edited the work claims to have been a fellow-student of Willobie's, but cannot be identified. The nearest known name is "Thomas Darell", who matriculated from Brasenose College at the same time as Willobie.

G. B. Harrison and Arthur Acheson suggested that Matthew Roydon wrote Willobie His Avisa. M. C. Bradbrook argued that it was a collaborative work written by Walter Raleigh's circle, the so-called School of Night. Acheson claimed that Avisa was Jane Davenant, the mother of William Davenant, who was alleged to have had an affair with Shakespeare.

== Regarding works by Shakespeare ==
In the 1590s in London, there seemed to be enmity between authors who were from the Universities and those who were not, and Willobie His Avisa, with its joining of W.S. and H. W., its allusions to Shakespeare's words and to Shakespeare himself, and its theatrical metaphors, should be considered in that context. Shakespeare, at the time, was known as an actor and author, and is believed to be the "Shake-scene" of Greene's Groats-Worth of Wit, which was published two years before Willobie His Avisa.

Avisa's story appears to be a variation of the story that is described in Shakespeare's sonnets: both involve a triangle of love interests. W.S. is described as an older actor advising a younger man who is pursuing a woman. Avisa’s H.W. and the young man of the sonnets have idiosyncrasies in common, including that both are given to bouts of tears. As Avisa says, she is “loth to see your blobered face/And loth to hear a yong man cry”. Of course, to compare the chaste Avisa with the Dark Lady of the Sonnets would certainly be intended as an irony.

The Sonnets were not fully published until 1609. But it is known from Francis Meres that they were being circulated among a privileged few before the publication date.

Willobie His Avisa is also seen as a variation of the story in Shakespeare's poem The Rape of Lucrece, a comparison which is suggested by Dorrell in his "Epistle to the Reader".

It has been noted that a number of lines and phrases found in Willobie His Avisa echo or resemble passages in works by Shakespeare, which suggests that the author of Willobie His Avisa had knowledge of those works, and that satire or imitation may be intended. One example can be found in these lines, spoken by W.S., and found in Willowbie His Avisa :

The smothered flame, too closely pent,
Burnes more extreame for want of vent …
So sorrows shrynde in secret brest,
Attainte the hart with hotter rage,
Then griefes that are to friends exprest,
Whose comfort may some part asswage.

Tudor readers of poetry would surely recognise in the above lines a parody of lines from Shakespeare's extremely popular poem Venus and Adonis, published the previous year:

An oven that is stopp’d, or river stayed
Burneth more hotly, swelleth with more rage.
So of concealed sorrow may be said
Free vent of words love’s fire doth assuage.

The advice of "W.S." is also very similar to that expressed in the poem "Whenas thine eye", published as the work of Shakespeare in the 1599 collection The Passionate Pilgrim, and which is in the same stanza form as Willobie's poem. However the authorship of "Whenas thine eye" is unclear, as the collection published poems by various authors under Shakespeare's name.
