= Book of Soyga =

16th-century Latin manuscript

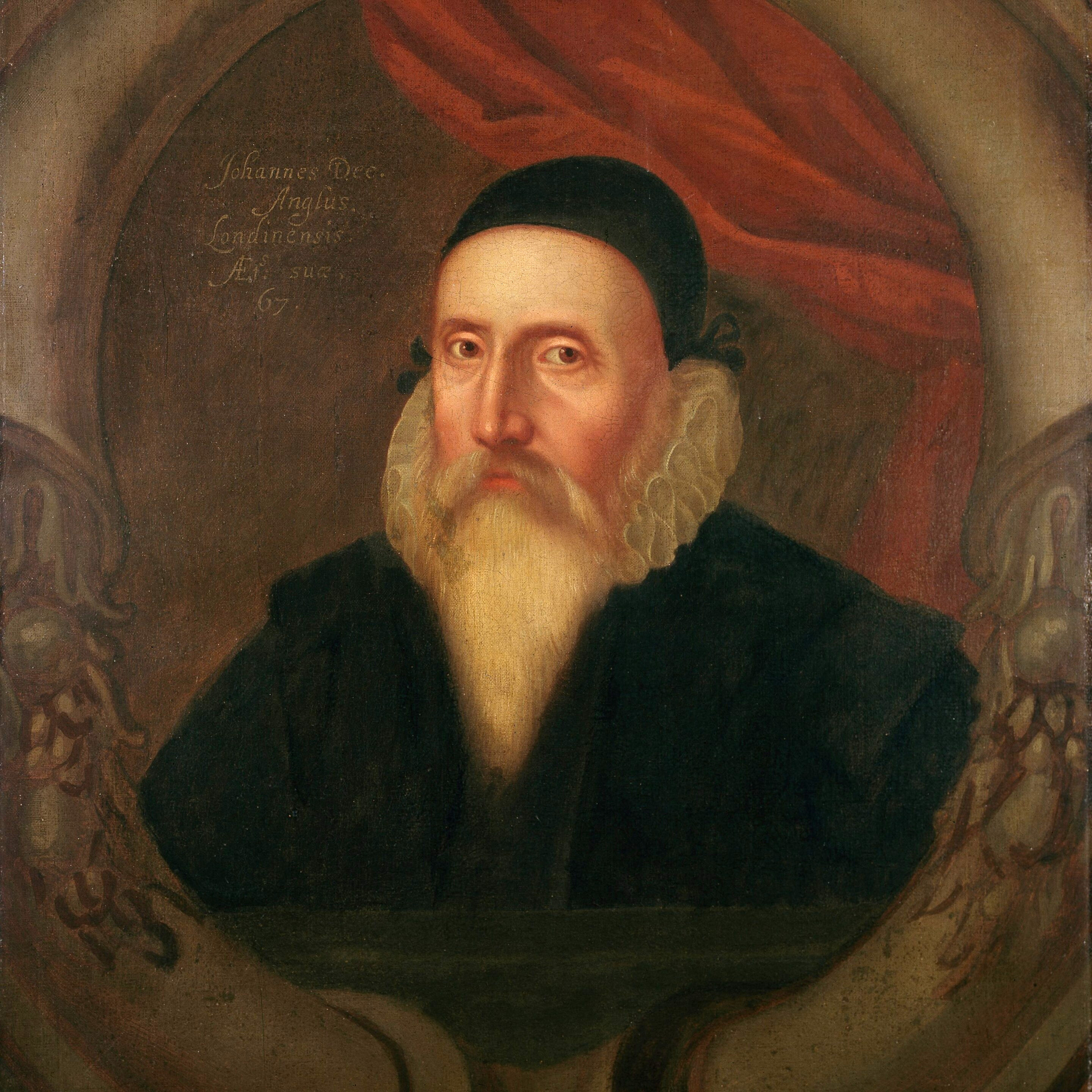
Portrait of John Dee in the Ashmolean Museum, Oxford

The Book of Soyga, also titled Aldaraia, is a 16th-century Latin treatise on magic, one copy of which was owned by the Elizabethan scholar John Dee. After Dee's death, the book was thought lost until 1994, when two manuscripts were located in the British Library (Sloane MS 8) and the Bodleian Library (Bodley MS. 908), under the title Aldaraia sive Soyga vocor. The Sloane MS 8 version is also described as Tractatus Astrologico Magicus, though the two versions differ only slightly.

== Provenance ==
Elias Ashmole recorded that the Duke of Lauderdale owned a manuscript titled Aldaraia sive Soyga vocor that had formerly belonged to Dee. The manuscript was sold at auction in 1692 and is now probably Sloane MS 8, based on Jim Reeds' identification. Bodley MS. 908 was donated to the Bodleian Library in 1605.

== Contents ==
Jim Reeds notes that the Bodley 908 MS consists of 197 pages including Liber Aldaraia (95 pages), Liber Radiorum (65 pages), and Liber decimus septimus (2 pages), as well as a number of shorter and unnamed works totaling approximately ten pages. The final 18 pages of the manuscript contain 36 tables of letters. The Sloane MS 8 manuscript consists of 147 pages, mostly identical to the Bodley manuscript, with the exception that the tables of letters appear on 36 pages, and the Liber Radiorum is presented in a two-page summarized version.

Amongst the incantations and instructions on magic, astrology, demonology, lists of conjunctions, lunar mansions, and names and genealogies of angels, the book contains 36 large squares of letters which Dee was unable to decipher. Otherwise unknown medieval magical treatises are cited, including works known as liber E, liber Os, liber dignus, liber Sipal, and liber Munob.

== Analysis ==
Jim Reeds, in his short work John Dee and the Magic Tables in the Book of Soyga which also appeared abbreviated in an essay, notes a proclivity to record words backwards in the MS, citing as examples Lapis reversed as Sipal, Bonum reversed as Munob, and the title of the MS, Soyga, as Agyos, literis transvectis, revealing a practice which sought to obscure some of the works cited. 'Soyga' is ‘Agios’ (Greek for "Holy") spelled backwards.

Reeds writes:

The Book of Soyga's preoccupation with letters, alphabet arithmetic, Hebrew-like backwards writing, and so on, is of course characteristic of the new Cabalistic magic which became popular in the sixteenth century, exemplified by the great compilation of Agrippa of Nettesheim (1486-1535), and borrowing authority both from the Renaissance humanist interest in the Kabbala expressed by such figures as Pico and Reuchlin and from the supposed Biblical antiquity of the Kabbalah."

Of the square tables that obsessed Dee, Reeds continued, "Although... not themselves a characteristic feature of the traditional Kabbalah, they had by Agrippa's time become an integral part of the Christian magical Cabala."

== Significance ==
In 1556, Dee proposed the founding of a national English library to Queen Mary, but his plan was not implemented. In consequence, Dee amassed the largest library in England at the time using his personal funds, consisting of at least 3,000 printed volumes and a large number of manuscripts. The library was pilfered during Dee's six-year trip to continental Europe between 1583 and 1589, and Dee was forced to sell many more volumes upon his return due to penury. After his death in 1608 or 1609, the still-considerable remnants of the vaunted library were ransacked until nothing remained.

During Dee's long trip to the continent, he sought to supernaturally contact angels through the services of a scryer, Edward Kelley. On the subject of the Book of Soyga, Dee claimed to have questioned the angel Uriel about the significance of the book and asked for guidance. The reply that Dee received was that the book had been revealed to Adam in Paradise by angels, and could only be interpreted by the archangel Michael.

After Deborah E. Harkness rediscovered the two copies of the book, Jim Reeds uncovered the mathematical formula used to construct the tables (starting with the seed word given for each table), and identified errors of various types made by the manuscripts' scribes. He showed that a subset of the errors were common to the two copies, suggesting that they were derived from a common ancestor which contained that subset of errors (and thus was presumably itself a copy of another work).

Although Reeds deciphered the construction algorithm and the code words used in crafting the tables, the actual contents and significance of the tables remain mysterious. He writes, "The treatise in the Book of Soyga which discusses the tables, Liber Radiorum, has a series of paragraphs mentioning the code words for twenty-three of the tables, together with number sequences which stand in unknown relation to the words."

== See also ==
- Grimoire
- Voynich manuscript
- Three Books of Occult Philosophy
