= The Book of Life (Harkness novel) =

2014 fantasy novel by Deborah Harkness

- Cover of The Book of Life
- Author: Deborah Harkness
- Language: English
- Series: All Souls trilogy
- Genre: Fantasy, romance, vampire, witchcraft, alchemy
- Publisher: Penguin Books
- Publication date: July 15, 2014
- Publication place: United States
- Media type: Print (Hardcover, Paperback)
- Pages: 561
- ISBN: 978-0-670-02559-6
- Preceded by: Shadow of Night

The Book of Life is a 2014 fantasy novel by American scholar Deborah Harkness, the third book in the All Souls trilogy. As the sequel to the 2012 bestseller, Shadow of Night, it follows the final steps in the story of Diana Bishop, a historian who comes from a long line of witches, and Matthew Clairmont, a long-lived vampire, as they unlock the secrets of an ancient manuscript.

== Synopsis ==
Having returned from their refuge in 16th century London to find a family member dead, Diana and Matthew embark on a mission of revenge, seeking the final pages of the Book of Life, and bringing justice to witches and vampires that have wronged them. Diana is now a member of the de Clermont family. They find the black sheep of the family, Benjamin, Matthew's disavowed son and dispose of him. Matthew's genetics work progresses, with the help of a Yale scientist, and they are able to remove the charter of Covenant, meaning inter-species marriage is possible. It had originally been drawn up based on fear and stereotypes the old generation held.

== Critical reception ==
The Book of Life was met with generally positive reviews from literary critics. Paula L. Woods of the Los Angeles Times noted "Harkness' ambitious melding of scientific and historical detail is inventive and brings surprising depth to such real-life societal scourges as racial purity and miscegenation." However, Woods also criticised a noticeable lack of continuity between previous novels in the series, stating "characters occasionally fail to acknowledge each other despite interactions in previous novels, and the date of an infamous attempt to steal the British crown jewels is off by a few hundred years.
