= Thomas Watson (poet) =

English poet and translator (1555 – c. 1592)

- Born: 1555; London
- Died: Before 26 September 1592 (aged 37); London
- Resting place: St Bartholomew-the-Less; 51.517922°N 0.100656°W
- Education: Winchester College; University of Oxford
- Occupations: Poet; Translator
- Notable work: The Hekatompathia, or, Passionate Century of Love
- Spouse: Anne Swift (m. 1585)
- Parents: William Watson; Anne Lee

Thomas Watson (1555 – before 26 September 1592) was an English poet and translator, and the pioneer of the English madrigal. His lyrics aside, he wrote largely in Latin, also being the first to translate Sophocles's Antigone from Greek. His incorporation of Italianate forms into English lyric verse influenced a generation of English writers, including Shakespeare, who was referred to in 1595 by William Covell as "Watson's heyre" (heir). He wrote both English and Latin compositions, and was particularly admired for the Latin. His unusual 18-line sonnets were influential, although the form was not generally taken up.

== Early life ==
Thomas Watson was born in mid-1555, probably in the parish of St Olave, Hart Street, London, to a prosperous London couple, William Watson and his 3rd wife, Anne Lee. His father's death in November 1559 was followed by his mother's in 1561, and Watson and his older brother went to live with their maternal uncle in Oxfordshire. From 1567, Watson attended Winchester College, and later attended Oxford University without gaining a degree. Sometime after his uncle's death in April 1572, Watson went to Europe, spending seven and a half years in Italy and France, according to the preface of his version of Antigone. While there he was already gaining a reputation as a poet. When he returned he studied law in London. Though he often signed his works as "student of law", he never practised law, as his true passion was literature. However, Roger Fisher has noted that "Watson's early legal training and associations have been downplayed by biographers in favour of his later image as a literary wit and reckless rake," but that he associated "with many well-known barristers in his day and frequented the Inns of Court."

Watson's De remedio amoris, perhaps his earliest important composition, is lost, as is his "piece of work written in the commendation of women-kind", which was also in Latin verse. His earliest surviving work is a 1581 Latin version of Antigone dedicated to Philip Howard, 20th Earl of Arundel. It also contains an appendix of Latin allegorical poems and experiments in classical metres.

== English poetry ==
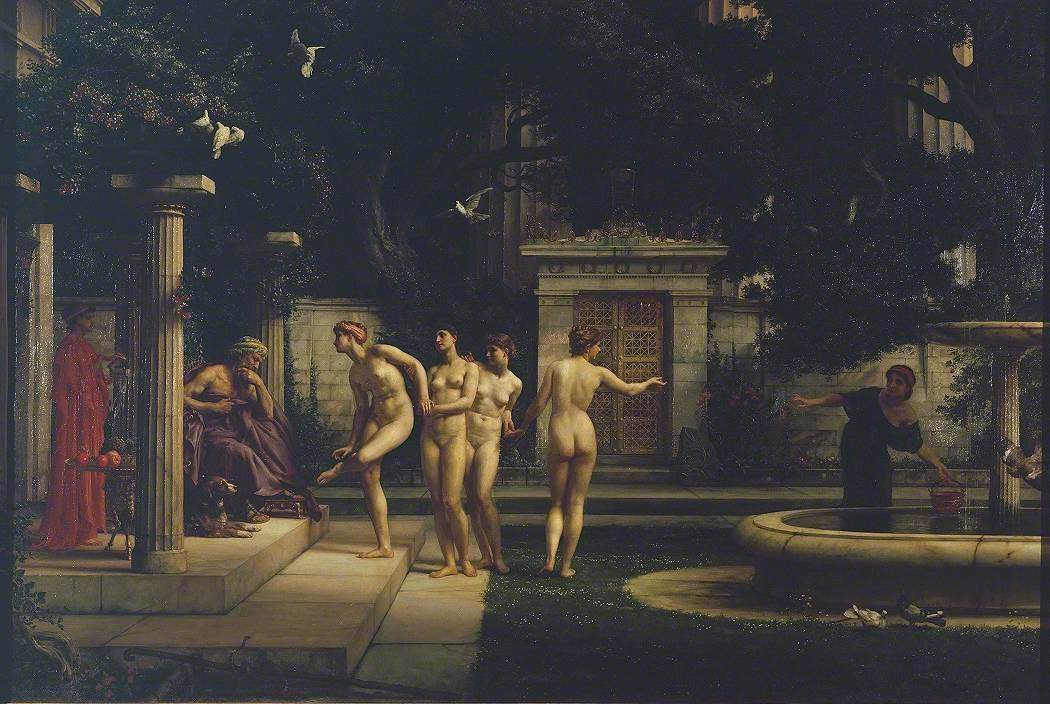
A Visit to Aesculapius by Edward Poynter. An 1880 painting inspired by Watson's poetry

The following year Watson appears for the first time as an English poet in verses prefixed to George Whetstone's Heptameron, and in a far more important work, as the author of the Hekatompathia or Passionate Centurie of Love, dedicated to Edward de Vere, 17th Earl of Oxford, who had read the poems in manuscript and encouraged Watson to publish them. Also entitled Watson's Passion the work, published in 1584, contains over 100 poems in French and Italian sonnet styles, including a number of translations. The technical peculiarity of these interesting poems is that, although they appear and profess to be sonnets, they are written in triple sets of common six-line stanza, and therefore have eighteen lines each.

Watson was recognised for his poetic "Methods and motifs", which occurred between 1580 and 1590. He was held in high regard by his contemporaries, even though his style was very similar to those of his late 15th and early 16th-century Italian predecessors Sannazaro and Strozzi. He openly drew from Petrarch and Ronsard, with what Sidney Lee describes as "drops of water from Petrarch and Ronsard's fountains," and Serafino dell'Aquila has been identified as the source for twelve later sonnets. Watson seriously desired to recommend his 18-line form to future sonneteers, but it attracted no imitators in that respect, although The Oxford Companion to English Literature notes that Watson's sonnets "appear to have been studied by Shakespeare and other contemporaries."

The little we have of Watson's prose is highly euphuistic. He was a friend of John Lyly at Oxford, and both continued their literary connection in London under the patronage of Edward de Vere, 17th Earl of Oxford, himself an Oxford alumnus.

== Latin poetry ==
As his reputation grew, Watson's name became associated with such literary powers as Christopher Marlowe, George Peele, Matthew Roydon and Thomas Achelley. He also gained a following of younger writers like Barnfield and Thomas Nashe, who regarded him as the best Latin poet in England. In 1585 he published his first Latin epic Amyntas, eleven days of a shepherd's mourning for the death of his lover, Phyllis. Watson's epic was afterwards translated into English by Abraham Fraunce, without the permission of the author (1587) and uncredited. Fraunce's translation was highly criticised. "His sins of translation result generally from an excess of zeal rather than a failure to understand his author's intention." Although a relationship to Torquato Tasso's Aminta is often supposed, in fact there is none. In the fourth reprint of his English version in 1591 Fraunce also printed his own translation of the Tasso work, and it is this that has given rise to the confusion. To forestall any further sub-standard English translations, Watson published his 1590 poem Melibœus, an elegy on the death of Sir Francis Walsingham, in both Latin and English.

== Plays ==
Watson was also a playwright, although none of his plays survive. His employer, William Cornwallis, comments that devising "twenty fictions and knaveryes in a play" was Watson's "daily practyse and his living" (Hall, p. 256). Francis Meres in 1598 lists him as among "our best for Tragedie".

It has been suggested that the anonymous Arden of Faversham is largely Watson's work with contributions by Shakespeare.

== Later life and posthumous publications ==
In his last years he was employed by William Cornwallis as tutor to Cornwallis's son, John (d. 1594), with whom he was on affectionate terms. On 6 September 1585 Watson married Anne Swift (b. 1564) at St Antholin, Budge Row, London. Anne was the older sister of another of William Cornwallis's retainers, Thomas Swift, a Norwich-born musician.

Related to music, he wrote a laudatory poem about John Case's book The Praise of Music (1586).

In 1589 Christopher Marlowe had been party to a fatal quarrel involving his neighbours and Watson in Norton Folgate; Marlowe was held in Newgate Prison for a fortnight.

In 1590 Watson authored The First Set of Italian Madrigals. This was printed by Thomas East (alias Este) and mainly consisted of compositions by the influential madrigal composer Luca Marenzio, whose work had become popular in England through the Musica Transalpina of Nicholas Yonge, published in 1588, also printed by Thomas East. Following the example of the earlier publication, Watson provided the madrigals with English lyrics. He was less literal in his approach to the Italian originals than Yonge, writing (as he put it), "not to the sense of the originall dittie, but after the affection of the Noate". Many of his versions are essentially new poems, bearing little resemblance to the original texts. Like the earlier collection, The First Set of Italian Madrigals contains music by William Byrd, in this case two settings of an original English text, "This sweet and merry month of May", presumably by Watson.

Of the remainder of Watson's career, nothing is known save that on 26 September 1592 he was buried in the church of St Bartholomew the Less and that a month later his second Latin epic "Amintae Gaudia" was seen through the press by his friend, "CM," possibly Marlowe. This tells the story of Amyntas' love and eventual winning of Phyllis, and is therefore chronologically the first part of the earlier epic. In the following year, his last book, The Tears of Fancie, or Love Disdained (1593), was posthumously published under the initials T. W. This is a collection of 60 sonnets, regular in form, so far at least as to have 14 lines each. As in "Hekatompathia", Watson uses the first person throughout The Tears of Fancie. The circumstances of its publication were extraordinary. Watson had ended up in prison for killing a man, apparently in defense of Marlowe in 1589, and so after Watson's death in September 1592, Marlowe repaid his debt by arranging for the publication of the sonnet sequence, shortly before his own death in May 1593. Spenser is supposed to have alluded to Watson's untimely death in Colin Clouts Come Home Again, when he says: "Amyntas quite is gone and lies full low, Having his Amaryllis left to moan".

== Reputation ==
Watson is mentioned by Francis Meres along with Shakespeare, Peele and Marlowe among "the best for tragedie", but no dramatic work of his except the translations already mentioned is extant today. Watson certainly enjoyed a great reputation in his lifetime, and he was not without direct influence on the youth of Shakespeare. He was the first, after an original experiment by Wyatt and Surrey, to introduce pure imitation of Petrarch into English poetry. As Meres puts it, "He shows his inventiveness by his variety of treatment.... It is the number of different ways in which he can introduce these devices in this matter that measures his success as a poet." He was well read in Italian, French and Greek literature.

== In modern literature ==
Watson plays a prominent part in the novel A Dead Man in Deptford by Anthony Burgess, in which he is a close friend of Marlowe. In the book, Watson introduces Marlowe to Sir Francis Walsingham and contributes to several of Marlowe's plays. He is a key character in The Marlowe Papers by Ros Barber.
