= Arthur Kelton =

Arthur Kelton (died 1549/1550) was an author who wrote in rhyme about Welsh history.

== Biography ==
Kelton, whose date of birth and ancestry are unclear, is credited with Book of Poetry in Praise of Welshmen (1546) and A Chronicle with a Genealogie declaring that the Brittons and Welshmen are linealiye dyscended from Brute (1547), which was dedicated to Edward VI. He dealt with early British history after the uncritical fashion of Geoffrey of Monmouth, and made no serious effort at scholarship.

== Recognition ==
As Philip Schwyzer says in the Dictionary of National Biography, "His works are devoted to the celebration, in roughly equal measure, of British antiquity, the Tudor dynasty, the Reformation, and the union of England and Wales. Kelton's originality lies in the way he fused these disparate strands into a grand historical narrative." This was later to be a common theme in English literature.
