= Alan Wall =

British novelist and short story writer

Alan Wall is a British novelist and short story writer.

== Biography ==
Wall was born in Bradford and studied at the University of Oxford. After a variety of jobs, he became a full-time writer in his forties. In addition to his work as a professional author, he has developed a career teaching creative writing with posts at Liverpool John Moores University, the University of Birmingham and the University of Chester. He is also a published poet and critic.

== Bibliography ==
=== Books ===
- Jacob 1993 (Poetry)
- Curved Light (1994)
- Bless the Thief (1997)
- Silent Conversations (1998)
- The Lightning Cage (1999)
- The School of Night (2001)
- China (2003)
- Sylvie's Riddle (2008)
- Badmouth (2014)

=== Short fiction ===
- Richard Dadd in Bedlam and Other Stories (1999)

Title	Year	First published	Reprinted/collected	Notes
Spider god and the periodic table	2013	Wall, Alan (April–May 2013). "Spider god and the periodic table". Asimov's Science Fiction. 37 (4&5): 108–135.		Novelette
