= Thomas Royden =

Thomas Royden may refer to:

- Sir Thomas Royden, 1st Baronet (1831–1917), English shipowner and Conservative Party politician
- Thomas Royden, 1st Baron Royden (1871–1950), son of the above, English Conservative Party politician
- Thomas Royden & Sons, a shipbuilder in Liverpool, England
