= Shadow of Night =

2012 fantasy novel by Deborah Harkness

- Cover of Shadow of Night
- Author: Deborah Harkness
- Language: English
- Series: All Souls trilogy
- Genre: Contemporary fantasy, romance, vampire, witchcraft, alchemy
- Publisher: Penguin Books
- Publication date: July 10, 2012
- Publication place: United States
- Media type: Print (Hardcover, Paperback)
- Pages: 592
- ISBN: 978-0-670-02348-6
- Preceded by: A Discovery of Witches
- Followed by: The Book of Life

Shadow of Night is a 2012 historical-fantasy novel by American scholar Deborah Harkness, the second book in the All Souls trilogy. As the sequel to the 2011 bestseller, A Discovery of Witches, it follows the story of Diana Bishop, a historian who comes from a long line of witches, and Matthew Clairmont, a long-lived vampire, as they unlock the secrets of an ancient manuscript. Diana and Matthew travel back in time to 16th century London during the Elizabethan era.

The book received generally mixed feedback from literary critics. Like its predecessor, A Discovery of Witches, it was praised for its blend of history and fantasy. Some critics felt that the book had too many secondary characters and plot elements. Harkness had previously studied England's Tudor period, in 2007 publishing a non-fiction book about the scientific revolution in Elizabethan London, The Jewel House.

Shadow of Night was first published in hardcover on July 10, 2012, by Viking Press, becoming a New York Times Best Seller upon its release. It has also been released as an ebook. Shadow of Night is followed by The Book of Life, the final installment of the All Souls trilogy, which was released on July 15, 2014.

== Background ==
In 2011, A Discovery of Witches was published as the first installment in the All Souls Trilogy, debuting at number two on the New York Times Best Seller list. Deborah Harkness began writing the All Souls Trilogy as a "thought experiment" after noticing the popularity of vampire fiction. Harkness has studied magic and the occult since 1983, which provided much of the inspiration for the series. Harkness is a respected historian of science and an expert on the Elizabethan era, which gave her the inspiration for the 16th century setting of Shadow of Night. Much of the research for Shadow of Night came from Harkness' dissertation on John Dee.

== Synopsis ==
Book Two of the All Souls Trilogy plunges Diana and Matthew into Elizabethan London, a world of spies and subterfuge, and a group of Matthew's old friends who are part of School of Night. The mission is to locate a witch to tutor Diana and to find traces of Ashmole 782, also known as The Book of Life. The book is a magical palimpsest, a manuscript with writing hidden underneath by a spell. As the net of Matthew's past tightens around them they embark on a very difficult journey. They find Goody Alsop to guide Diana. With her friends, Alsop helps Diana to understand that she is a weaver, one who creates her own spells. They also help her evoke her familiar, a dragon (firedrake) that acts as a protector. Diana and Matthew come to know that Ashmole 782 is made out of materials of creatures like skin, bones, blood, etc. and could be a codex of creature reproduction. Matthew Clairmont and Diana discover that time travel is no simple matter as they have to confront their ancestors; neither is their search for understanding themselves and retrieving the key that holds the legacy of creatures shadowed by history and secrets.

== Publication history ==
Harkness submitted the novel's manuscript to her publisher in late 2011. Shadow of Night was published by Viking Press for a North American release on 10 July 2012. It debuted at number one in Hardcover Fiction on the New York Times Best Seller list, and number four in Combined Print & E-book Fiction. It landed at number four on the USA Today Best-Selling Book list.

== Critical reception ==
Shadow of Night was met with generally positive reviews from literary critics. Sherryl Connelly of the New York Daily News described the novel as "rich, period fun, particularly delightful in its witty characterization of historical immortals." Carol Memmott of USA Today gave the book four stars, praising Harkness' attention to historical details. Both Memmott and Margot Adler of NPR expressed excitement and anticipation for the next novel in the series. Entertainment Weekly also praised the novel, giving Shadow of Night a B+: "The joy that Harkness, herself a historian, takes in visiting the past is evident on every page. […] Like any love affair, Shadow of Night has its rough patches. But its enduring rewards are plenty."

Many critics pointed out that the novel was too complex, and it had too many secondary characters and plot elements. Paula Woods of The Los Angeles Times said Shadow of Night is "overstuffed but entertaining." Elizabeth Hand, who previously criticized A Discovery of Witches as being too slow, said that Shadow of Night "proceeds at a snail's pace" and is "overstuffed with secondary characters and plot elements that never quite earn out." However, Hand wrote: "Fortunately, Harkness makes up for a lack of narrative thrust by weaving a tapestry of 16th-century European life." Sarah Willis of The Plain Dealer felt similarly: "The many details of place and time are lush, and every opportunity to describe clothes, furniture, buildings, even a mousetrap, is indulged. But the plot wanders as much as the characters do, and the first 250 pages are slow."

== Historical references ==
People

- Elias Ashmole
- Judah Loew ben Bezalel
- William Cecil, 1st Baron Burghley
- George Chapman
- Jane Dee
- John Dee
- Robert Devereux, 2nd Earl of Essex
- Elizabeth I
- Erasmus Habermehl
- Thomas Harriot
- Tadeáš Hájek
- Nicholas Hilliard
- Joris Hoefnagel
- Rudolf II, Holy Roman Emperor
- Edward Kelley
- Christopher Marlowe
- Henry Percy, 9th Earl of Northumberland
- Elizabeth Raleigh
- Walter Raleigh
- Mathew Roydon
- Mary Sidney
- The School of Night

Books & Art

- Voynich manuscript
- Aurora consurgens
- The Countess of Pembroke's Arcadia
- A painting by Hieronymus Bosch (Ch. 27)

Places

- Baynard's Castle
- Blackfriars, London
- Middle Temple
- Prague Castle
- Richmond Palace
- St Paul's Cathedral
- Royal Exchange, London
- All-Hallows-the-Great
- Staple Inn (inspiration for The Hart & Crown)
- Woodstock, Oxfordshire
