= Mathew Roydon =

English poet

Mathew Roydon (sometimes spelled Matthew) (died 1622) was an English poet associated with the School of Night group of poets and writers.

== Life ==
The Dictionary of National Biography identified him tentatively as the son of Owen Roydon who co-operated with Thomas Proctor in 1578 in the latter's Gorgious Gallery of Gallant Inventions; and as the Mathew Royden who graduated M.A. at Oxford on 7 July 1580. He was soon afterwards a prominent figure in literary society in London, and knew the poets of the day, including Philip Sidney, Christopher Marlowe, Edmund Spenser, Thomas Lodge, and George Chapman.

Roydon fell in with Marlowe, and he, Thomas Harriot, and William Warner are mentioned among those companions of the dramatist who shared his freethinking. Christopher Hill has suggested that Roydon may have been the author of Willobie His Avisa (1594), published by Henry Willobie (quite possibly pseudonymous but unidentified). The group around Marlowe, in his view, discussed religion, and besides Roydon included Harriot and Walter Warner. It is not clear from the literature which Warner is meant.

In later life Roydon seems to have entered the service of Robert Radcliffe, 5th Earl of Sussex, a patron of men of letters. He was reduced to appeals for charity to Edward Alleyn.

== Works, allusions and reputation ==
His friendship with Sidney he commemorated in his Elegie, or Friends passion for his Astrophill, a poem on Sidney's death. It was first published in the Phoenix Nest, 1593, and was printed with Spenser's Astrophel in Spenser's Colin Clout, 1595; and it reappears in later editions of Spenser's works. Another of his literary friends, Chapman, dedicated to him his Shadow of Night in 1594, and Ovid's Banquet of Sence in 1595. In the former dedication Chapman recalls how he first learned from Roydon of the devotion to learning of the Ferdinando Stanley, 5th Earl of Derby, Henry Percy, 9th Earl of Northumberland, and George Carey. He wrote of Roydon,

It is in the exceeding rapture of delight in the deepe search of knowledge, none knoweth better than thyselfe, sweet Mathew, that maketh men manfully indure th'extremes incident to that Herculean labour

John Davies of Hereford addressed to Roydon highly complimentary verse in the appendix to his Scourge of Folly, 1611. Robert Armin, when dedicating his Italian Taylor and his Boy (1609) to Lady Haddington, the Earl of Sussex's daughter Elizabeth, refers to Roydon as 'a poetical light . . . which shines not in the world as it is wisht, but yet the worth of its lustre is known.'

In Thomas Nashe's Address to the gentlemen students of both universities, prefixed to Robert Greene's Arcadia (1587), Roydon is mentioned with Thomas Achlow and George Peele as leading London poets. Francis Meres, in his Palladis Tamia (1598), describes Roydon as worthy of comparison with the great poets of Italy. Apart from his elegy on Sidney, the only other compositions by Roydon in print are some verses before Thomas Watson's Sonnets (1581), and before Sir George Peckham's True Reporte (1583). Martin Garrett writes that Roydon "was associated at various times with Spenser, Marlowe, and Chapman", and quotes Nashe, prefacing Greene's Menaphon (1589), in saying that Roydon "hath shewed himselfe singular in the immortall Epitaph of his beloved Astrophell, besides many other most absolute Comike inventions". According to Garrett:

If the epitaph was the same as the elegy, and if it was not revised between composition and publication, it constitutes the earliest known account of Astrophil and Stella. As in Spenser's elegy-as a source of which it should perhaps be classed-the boundary between Sidney and Astrophil, life and work, is unclear and Stella idealized rather than 'identified'... The 'Elegie' was first published with those of Ralegh and Dyer, in The Phoenix Nest (1593), and then in the Astrophel collection.

— Martin Garrett, Sidney: The Critical Heritage (1996) p.105-6.

== Fiction ==
In Deborah Harkness's novel Shadow of Night, the character Matthew de Clermont, a vampire, is revealed to have been, in the Elizabethan era, Matthew Roydon of the School of Night. In The Marlen of Prague: Christopher Marlowe and the City of Gold, a historical fantasy by Angeli Primlani, Roydon appears as one of the Queen's mages.
