= The School of Night =

Supposed group of poets and scientists of Elizabethan England

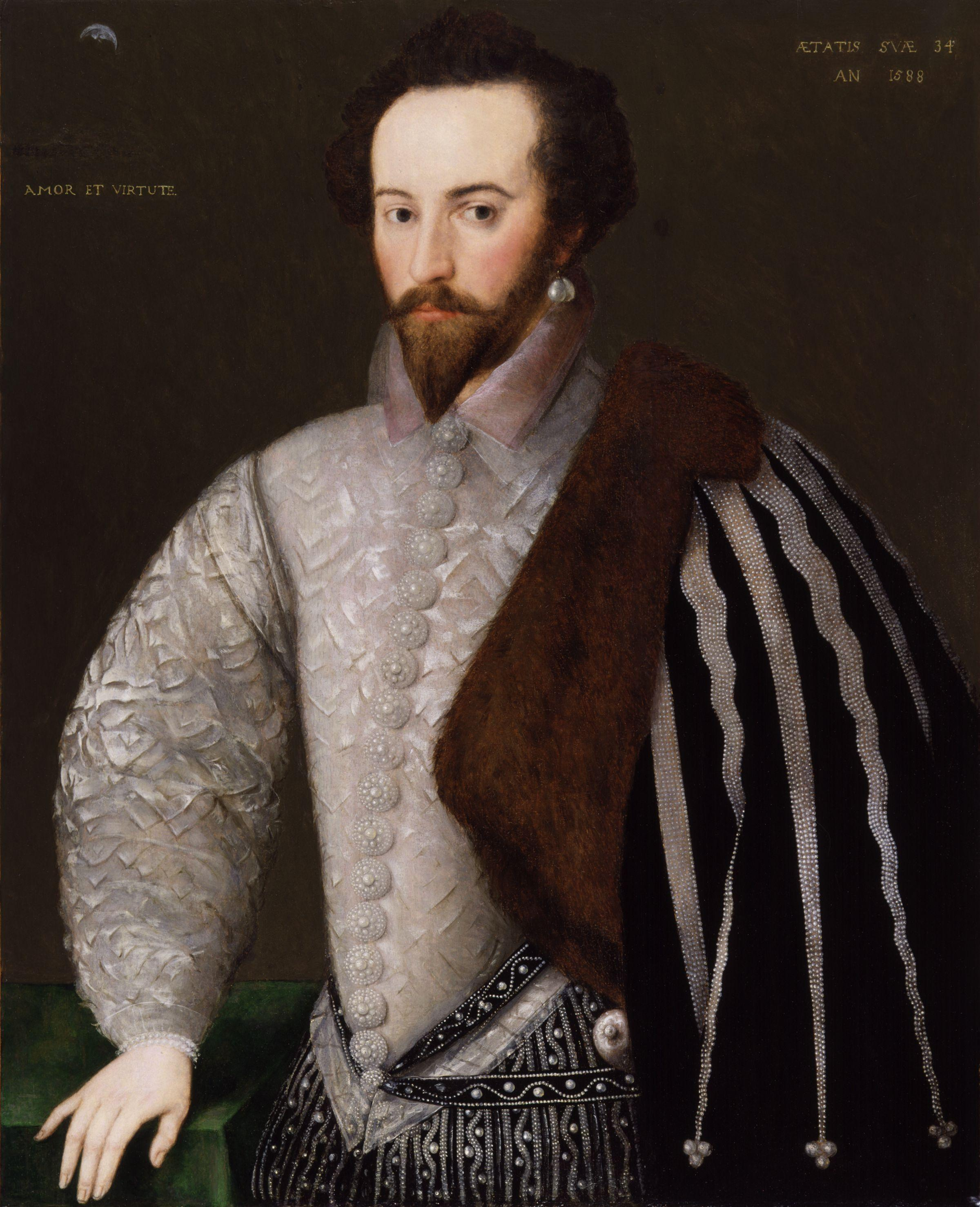
Walter Raleigh

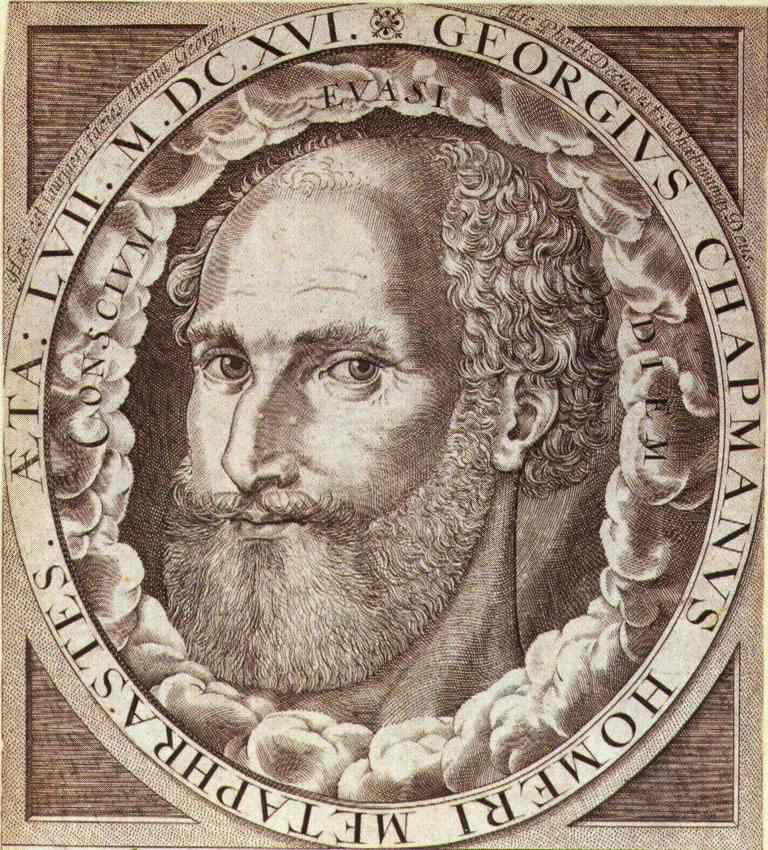
George Chapman

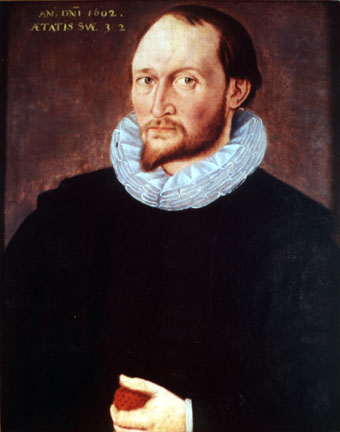
Thomas Harriot

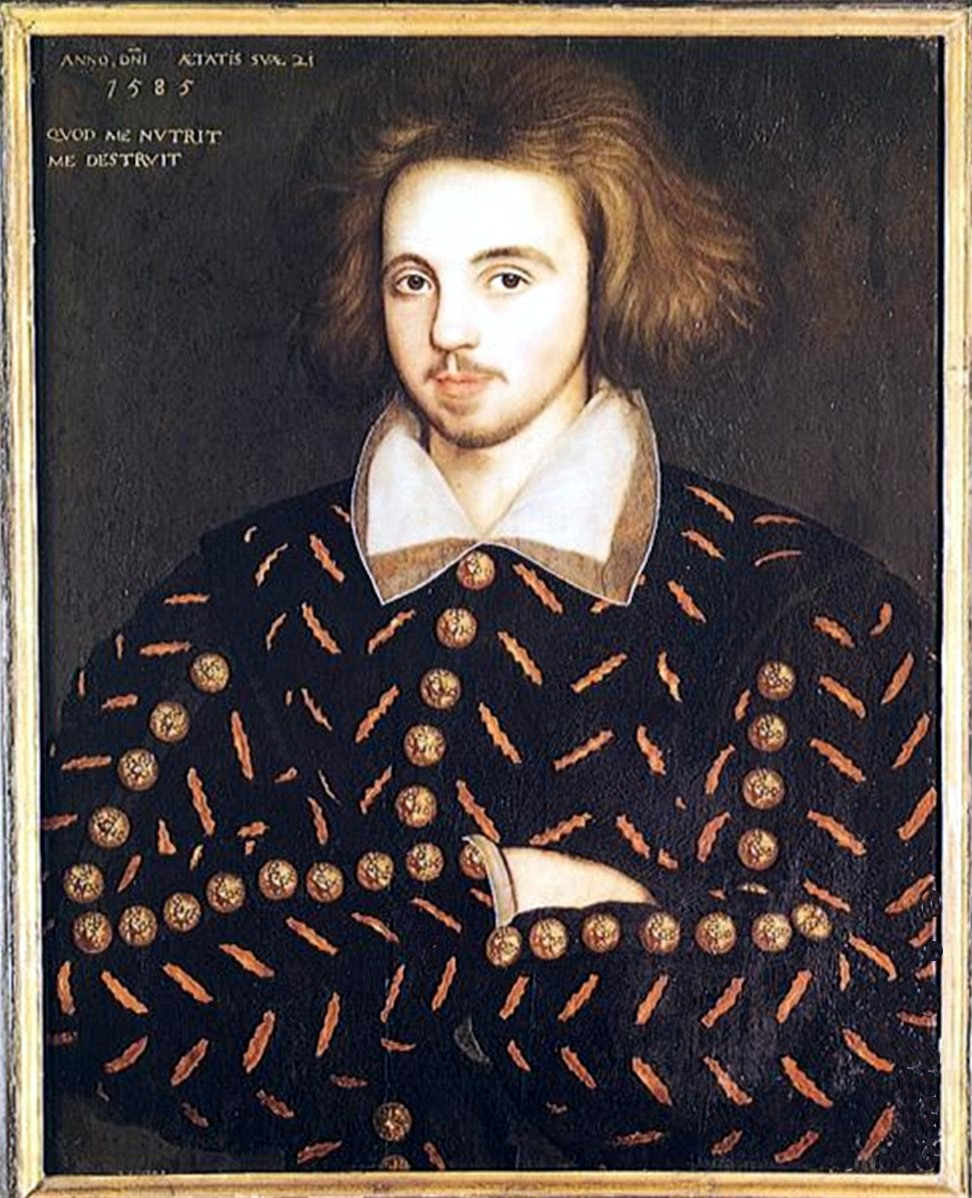
Christopher Marlowe

The School of Night is a modern name for a group of men centred on Sir Walter Raleigh that was once referred to in 1592 as the "School of Atheism". The group supposedly included poets and scientists Christopher Marlowe, George Chapman, Matthew Roydon and Thomas Harriot.

There is no firm evidence that all of these men were known to each other, but speculation about their connections features prominently in some writing about the Elizabethan era.

== Name ==
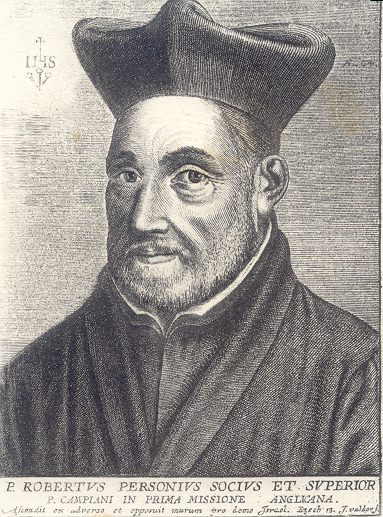
Robert Persons SJ, who denounced Raleigh's "School of atheism"

Raleigh was first named as the centre of the "School of Atheism" by the Jesuit priest Robert Persons in 1592. "School of Night", however, is a modern appellation: the theory that this purported school was a clandestine intellectual coterie was launched by Arthur Acheson on textual grounds, in his Shakespeare and the Rival Poet (1903). The new name is a reference to a passage in Act IV, scene 3 of Shakespeare's Love's Labour's Lost, in which the King of Navarre says "Black is the badge of hell / The hue of dungeons and the school of night." Acheson's proposal was endorsed by notable editors John Dover Wilson and Arthur Quiller Couch in their 1923 edition of Love's Labour's Lost. There are, however, at least two other recorded renderings of the line, one reading "suit of night" and the other as "scowl of night".

The context of the lines has nothing to do with cabals: the King is simply mocking the black hair of Rosaline, his friend Berowne's lover. John Kerrigan explains that the line is perfectly straightforward as it stands, a riposte to Berowne's praise of his dark-haired mistress as "fair", and any attempts to load it with topical significance are misleading; the simple meaning of "black is the school where night learns to be black" is all that is required.

In 1936 Frances Yates found an unpublished essay on scholarship by the Earl of Northumberland, an associate of Raleigh and supposed member of the movement, and interpreted the earl's mockery of the "precious affectations" found among scholars as inspiring the key celibacy theme of the play. The supposition is discounted as fanciful by some, but nonetheless received acceptance by some prominent commentators of the time.

== Atheism ==
It is alleged that each of these men studied science, philosophy, and religion, and all were suspected of atheism. Atheism at that time was a charge nearly the equivalent of treason ergo a death penalty, since the English monarch after Henry VIII's reforms was the head of the Church of England, and to be against the church was, ipso facto, to be against the monarch. However, it was also a name for anarchy, and was a charge frequently brought against the politically troublesome. Richard Baines, an anti-Catholic spy for her Majesty's Privy Council, whose "task was presumably to provide his masters with what they required", charged in an unsworn deposition that he had heard from another that Marlowe had "read the Atheist lecture to Sr. Walter Raleigh [and] others". This tale of hearsay, from a paid informer, failed to substantiate the charges of atheism against the group, but it did include a promise of more evidence to be revealed at a later date.

== In culture ==
Since the early 1990s (by which point the School of Night hypothesis had fallen out of mainstream academic favour), the School of Night has frequently been represented in fiction.

A play titled The School of Night, by Peter Whelan, dealing with the relationship between Shakespeare and Christopher Marlowe, was presented by the Royal Shakespeare Company at The Other Place theatre in November 1992. The School of Night also figures prominently in novels: The Scholars of Night (1988) by John M. Ford, a Cold War thriller involving an undiscovered Christopher Marlowe play; A Dead Man in Deptford (1993) by Anthony Burgess; Veronica (1996) by Nicholas Christopher; School of the Night (2000) by Judith Cook; The School of Night (2001) by Alan Wall, a story of a present-day researcher who becomes obsessed by connections between Shakespeare's plays and members of the "school"; The School of Night (2010) by Louis Bayard; and Shadow of Night (2012) by Deborah Harkness.

The School of Night is also the name of a group of actors and improvisers inspired by the original group and brought together under the auspices of the celebrated theatrical maverick Ken Campbell. The idea is that this group of poets, playwrights, scientists and thinkers might have collectively written the plays attributed to the Bard. The modern-day School of Night shows feature improvisation in the style of poets and playwrights suggested by the audience, and generally includes the creation (or in the jargon of the show 'channeling') of a lost Shakespearean masterpiece.

In October 2023, Karl Ove Knausgård released a book called "Nattskolen" (directly translated "The school of night") in which Marlowe's "Dr. Faustus" plays a prominent role.
