= Friedrich Dedekind =

German humanist, theologian and bookseller

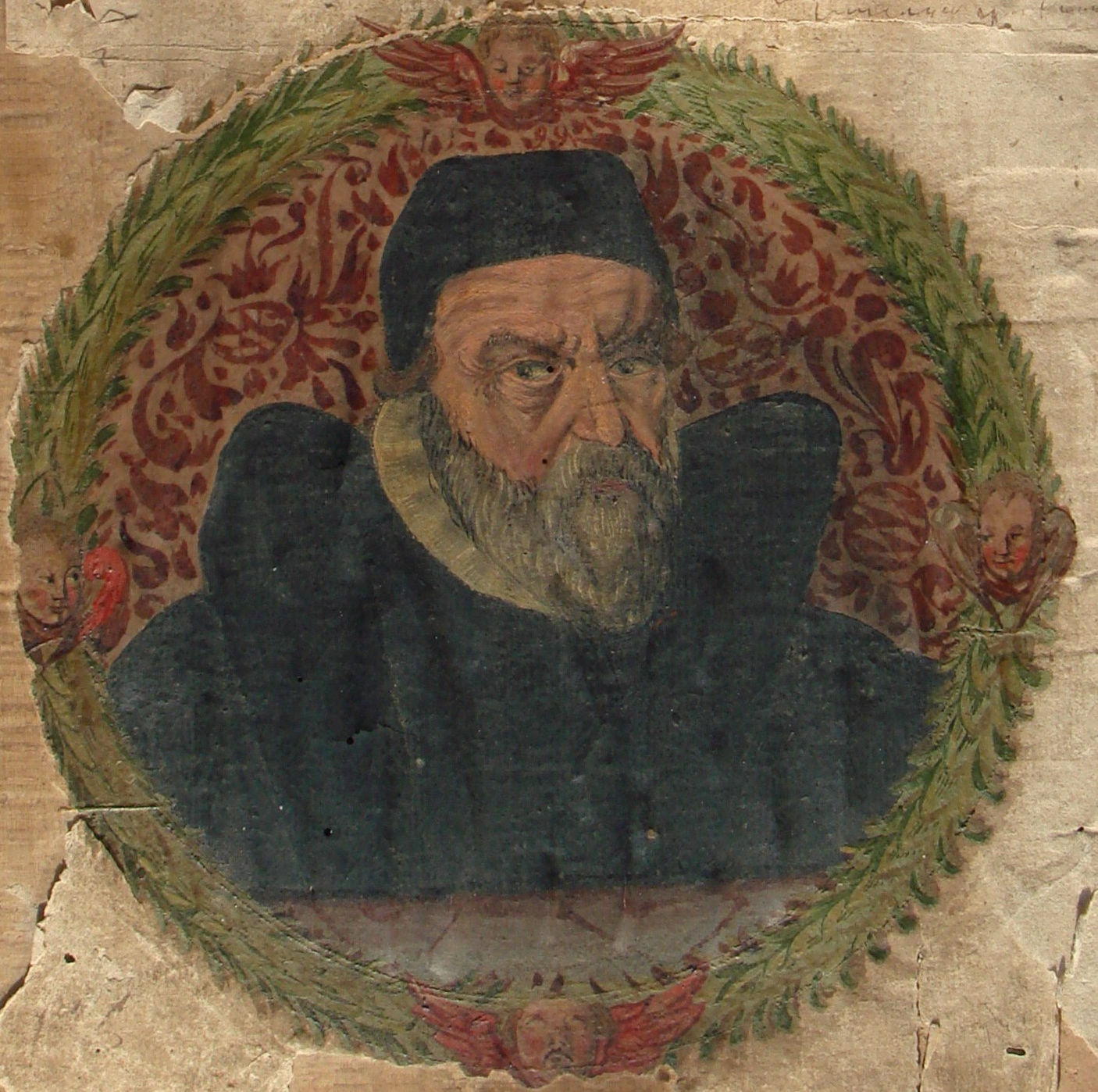
Friedrich Dedekind

Friedrich Dedekind (1524 – February 27, 1598) was a German humanist, theologian, and bookseller.

Born in Neustadt am Rübenberge, he was educated at the universities of Marburg (1543) and Wittenberg, where he studied theology. At Wittenberg, his talents were recognized by Philipp Melanchthon. As magister, he became in 1575 a minister and inspector of churches in Lüneburg.

He wrote plays and in later years became involved in mediating theological disputes.

He died on February 27, 1598, at Lüneburg.

== Dedekind's Grobianus ==
Dedekind was the author of Grobianus et Grobiana: sive, de morum simplicitate, libri tres (Cologne, 1558). This work had first been published in 1549 as Grobianus, but it appeared with additions known as Grobiana in 1554.

A poem in Latin elegiac verse, it was first published in two books in 1549, and revised form and enlarged to three books in 1552. Dedekind's work had an immense popularity across Continental Europe.

The work describes the fictional Saint Grobian as a counselor who teaches men on how to avoid bad manners, gluttony, and drunkenness.

Dedekind's work appeared in England in 1605 as The Schoole of Slovenrie: Or, Cato turnd wrong side outward, published by one "R.F.". The "Schoole" was imagined as a place where one was instructed to use one's greasy fingers to grab at the nicest portions of any dish and snatch food belonging to fellow diners. Holding back the desire to urinate, fart, and vomit is taught to be bad for one's health; thus, one has to indulge freely in all three activities.

The work also inspired Thomas Dekker's The Guls Horne-Booke (1609).

The Portrait of Friedrich Dedekind was found in Hannover (2008) by Eberhard Doll, hidden for more than 400 years under the front cover of his own personal Bible, at the Gottfried Whilhelm Leibniz Library. This portrait was painted in beautiful water colors and underneath, a hand-written autograph in Latin was dedicated to his elder son Euricius. Signed by Friedrich, Luneburg 1589.

== Plays ==
- Der christliche Ritter ("The Christian Knight") (1576)
- Papista conversus (1596)
