= Deborah Harkness =

American scholar and novelist

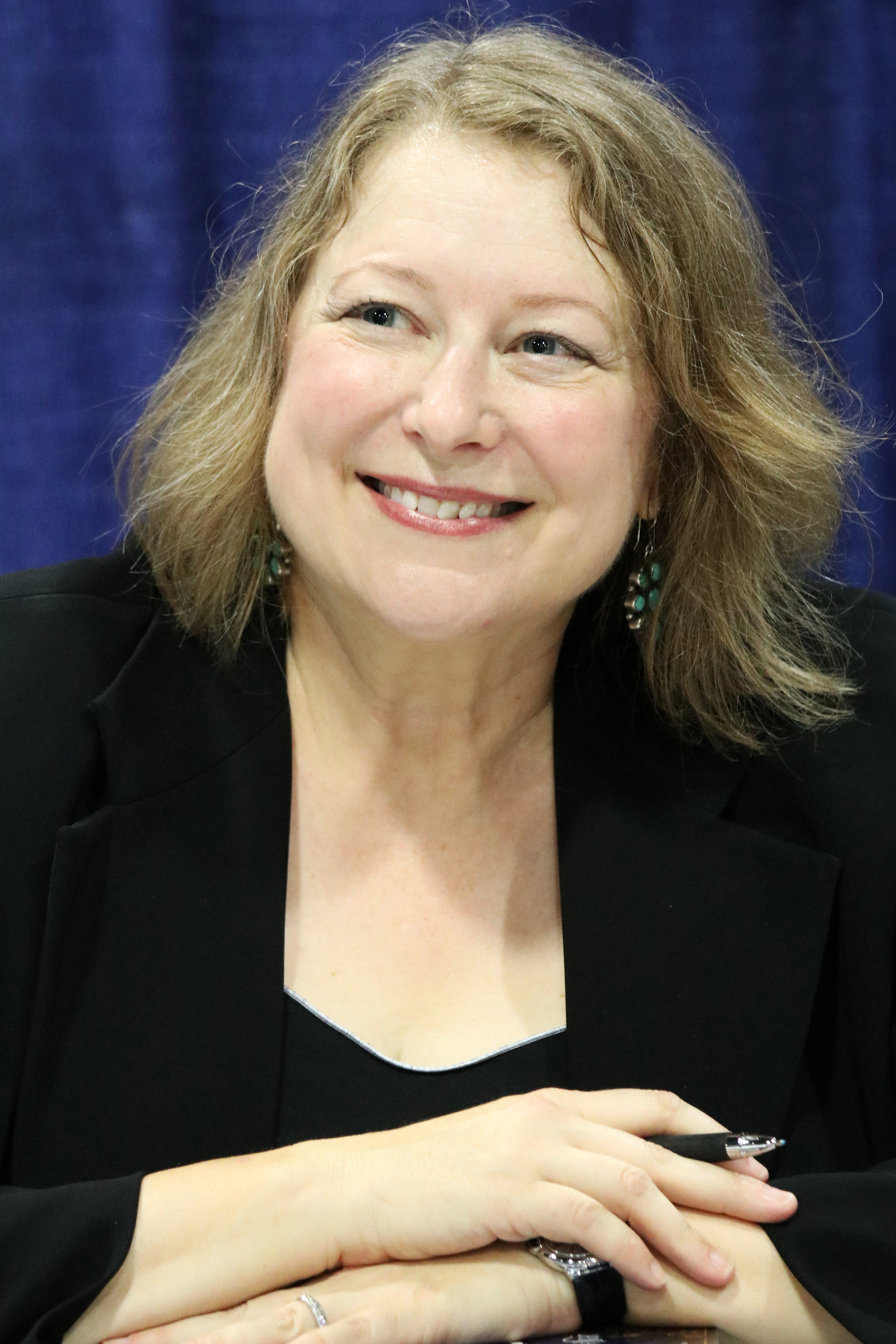
- Harkness at the 2018 U.S. National Book Festival
- Born: 1965 (age 60–61); Philadelphia, Pennsylvania, U.S.
- Education: Mount Holyoke College (BA); Northwestern University (MA); University of California, Davis (PhD)
- Occupations: Scholar, novelist
- Writing career
- Genres: Fantasy, historical fiction
- Notable works: A Discovery of Witches; Shadow of Night; The Book of Life; Time's Convert
- Website: www.deborahharkness.com

External audio
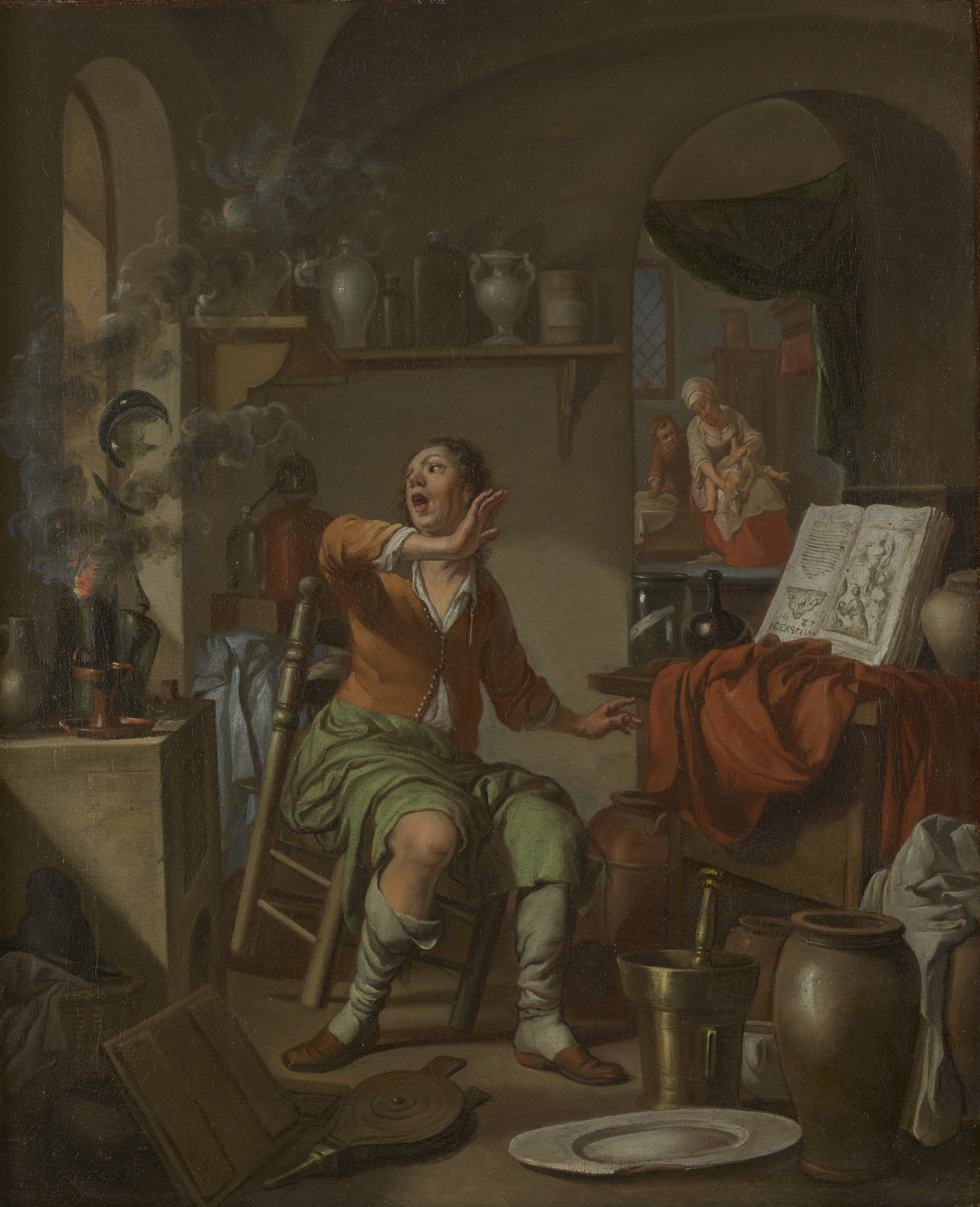
- "Science and the Supernatural in the 17th Century", Deborah Harkness & Jim Voelkel, Science History Institute

Deborah Harkness (born 1965) is an American scholar and novelist, best known as a historian and as the author of the All Souls Trilogy, which consists of The New York Times best-selling novel A Discovery of Witches and its sequels Shadow of Night and The Book of Life. Her latest book is The Black Bird Oracle, a sequel to the All Souls Trilogy.

== Early life ==
Born in 1965, Harkness grew up near Philadelphia, Pennsylvania, the daughter of an American-born father and a British-born mother. She is a graduate of Mount Holyoke College (B.A., 1986), Northwestern University (M.A., 1990), and the University of California, Davis (Ph.D., 1994). Harkness also studied in England at Oxford University. She is a well-regarded historian of science and medicine, as well as having taught courses about the history of magic and science.

== Career ==
Harkness is a professor of history and teaches European history and the history of science at the University of Southern California. She has published two works of historical non-fiction, John Dee's Conversations with Angels: Cabala, Alchemy and the End of Nature (1999) and The Jewel House: Elizabethan London and the Scientific Revolution (2007).

In 2011, Harkness published her first work of fiction, A Discovery of Witches. The first novel in the All Souls trilogy, A Discovery of Witches is a historical fiction novel that tells the story of a modern-day witch who inadvertently calls up an ancient enchanted manuscript at Oxford University's Bodleian Library thereby attracting the unwelcome notice of a host of magical creatures who live among humans, including other witches, daemons, and a 1,500-year-old French vampire. The novel debuted at number two on The New York Times Best Seller hardcover fiction list, and has been sold in at least 34 countries. The book was called "a sophisticated fairy tale for adults" by the San Antonio Express-News. The second novel in the series, Shadow of Night, was published a year later, becoming a number one success on The New York Times Best Seller list. The third novel in the series, called The Book of Life, was published on July 15, 2014, in hardback, e-book, and audiobook in the US, UK, Canada, and Ireland.

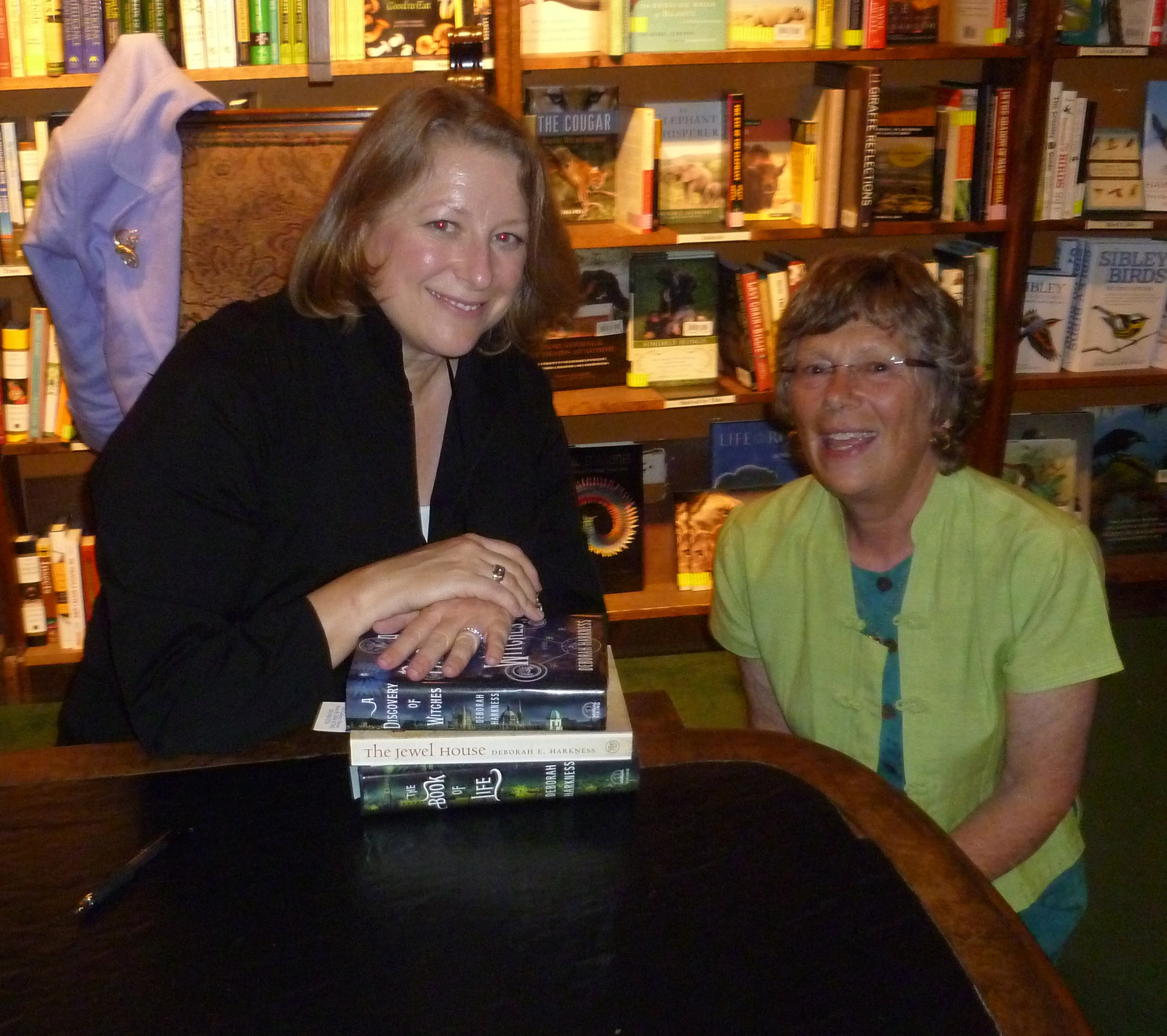
Harkness at book signing, August 2014

On January 9, 2014, the United States front cover and a two-page excerpt were released to the public on USA Today. On May 12, 2014, chapter 1 was released on Harkness' website. Harkness is also the author of the award-winning wine blog, Good Wine Under $20.

Harkness released a companion book in May 2018 entitled The World of All Souls: The Complete Guide to A Discovery of Witches, Shadow of Night, and The Book of Life (All Souls Trilogy), followed in September 2018 by an All Souls series trilogy prequel/sequel entitled Time's Convert. The book features Marcus Whitmore, Matthew Clairmont's vampire son.

Harkness is an executive producer of BadWolf's television series based on Harkness' novel, A Discovery of Witches. The series premiered in the UK on Sky One on September 14, 2018, and streams on NOW TV and Netflix. The international distribution of the series is handled by Sky Vision. It was revealed by Sky One on All Souls Day (November 2) 2018 that the TV series would be extended by seasons 2 and 3, corresponding to the A Discovery of Witches sequels Shadow of Night and The Book of Life. Season 2 (10 episodes) was released in early 2021, and season 3 ( 7 episodes) in early 2022.

== Personal life ==
Harkness married her longtime partner, Karen Halttunen, they had been together since 1995. She currently lives in Southern California where she is a professor of history.

She was diagnosed with ovarian cancer in 2021.

== Bibliography ==
=== Novels ===
==== All Souls ====
1. A Discovery of Witches (2011)
2. Shadow of Night (2012)
3. The Book of Life (2014)
4. Time's Convert (2018)
5. The Black Bird Oracle (2024)
6. The Falcon and the Rose (TBD)

==== Companions ====
- The All Souls Real-Time Reading Companion (2015)
- The World of All Souls: A Complete Guide to A Discovery of Witches, Shadow of Night, and the Book of Life (2018)

=== Other books ===
- John Dee's Conversations with Angels: Cabala, Alchemy, and the End of Nature. Cambridge, U.K.: Cambridge University Press. 1999. ISBN 9780521622288. OCLC 39748178.
- Harkness, Deborah E. (2007). The Jewel house of art and nature: Elizabethan London and the social foundations of the scientific revolution. New Haven: Yale University Press. ISBN 9780300111965. OCLC 226002129. (see also The Jewel House)

=== Journal articles ===
- Harkness, Deborah E. (Spring 2008). "A view from the streets: women and medical work in Elizabethan London". Bulletin of the History of Medicine. 82 (1). Johns Hopkins University: 52–85. doi:10.1353/bhm.2008.0001. PMID 18344585. S2CID 5695475.

== Awards ==
- Comic-Con International's Inkpot Award for (2018)
- Honorary Degree, Mount Holyoke College (2014)

Harkness' faculty profile on the University of Southern California's website also lists the following honors and awards:

- Highly Commended, Longman-History Today Awards Book Prize, Spring 2009
- Pfizer Award for Best Book in the History of Science, History of Science Society, Fall 2008
- John Best Snow Prize for Best Book in British Studies, North American Conference on British Studies, Fall 2008
- Prize for Best Book, Pacific Coast Conference on British Studies, Spring 2008
- Huntington Library Research Fellowship, National Endowment for the Humanities Fellow, 2006–2007
- Guggenheim Fellowship, John S. Guggenheim Foundation, 2004–2005
- Residency at the National Humanities Center, National Humanities Center, John E. Sawyer Fellow, 2004–2005
- NIH/NSF Career Development Award, National Science Foundation Senior Scholar's Award, 2001–2002
- Derek Price Award for Best Isis Article, History of Science Society, 1998
- American Council of Learned Societies Fellowship, 1997–1998
- Huntington Library Research Fellowship, National Endowment for the Humanities Fellowship, Huntington Library, 1997–1998
- Nelson Prize for Best Article, Renaissance Society of America, 1997
- Jacob K. Javits Fellowship, U.S. Department of Education, 1989–1993
- Fulbright Award, Fulbright Fellowship to the United Kingdom, 1991–1992
