= Hôtel-Dieu de Lyon =

Building in Lyon, France

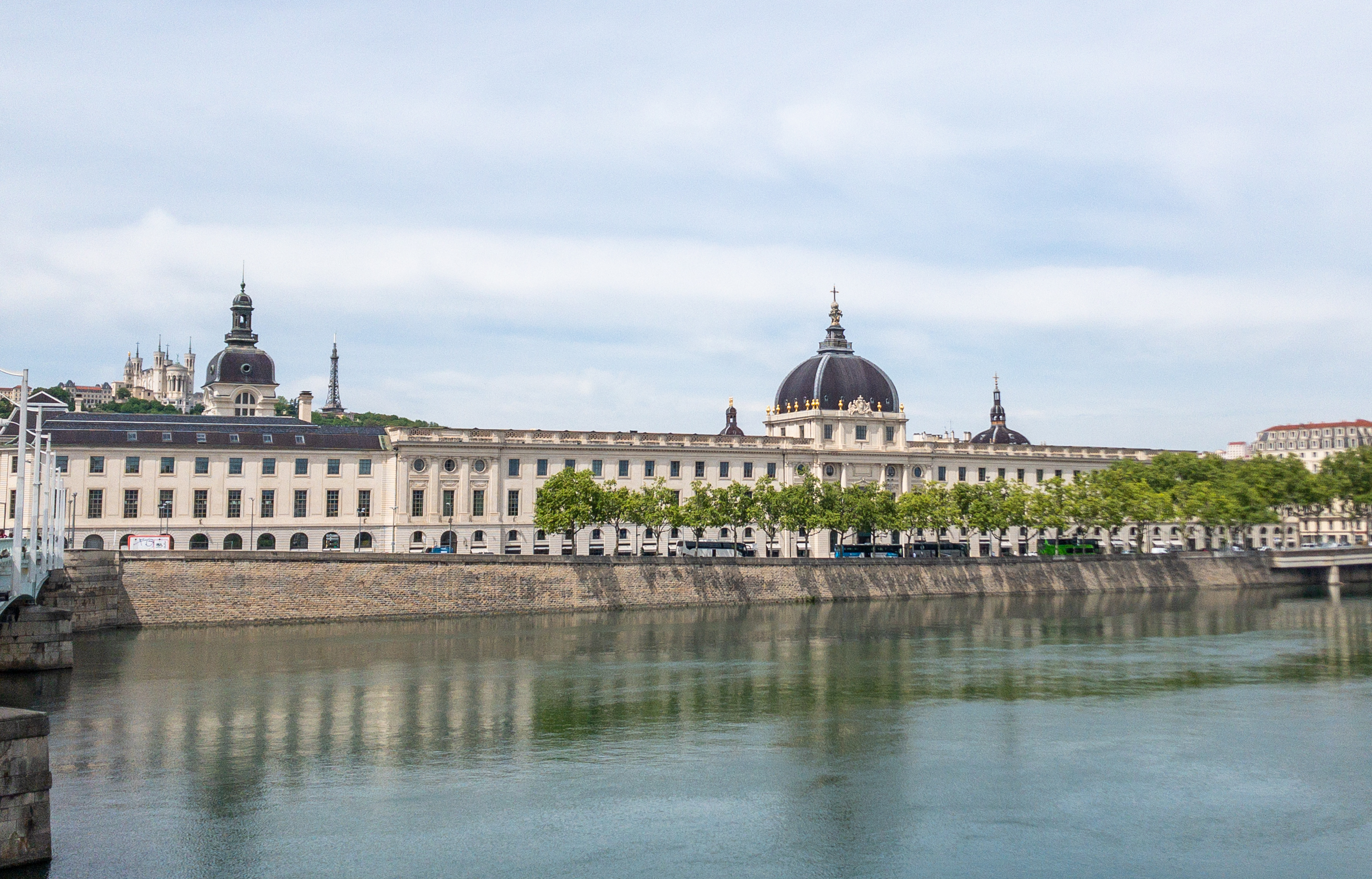
- The Hôtel-Dieu in Lyon at night, from the left bank of the Rhône

Geography
- Location: Lyon, France
- Coordinates: 45°45′30″N 4°50′11″E

History
- Opened: 1454
- Closed: 2010

Links
- Lists: Hospitals in France

The Hôtel-Dieu de Lyon (French pronunciation: [otɛl djø də ljɔ̃]) was a hospital of historical significance situated on the right bank of the Rhône river in Lyon, on the Presqu'île (the peninsula between the Saône and Rhône which run through the city centre). It has been out of use since 2010. As part of the Presqu'île district, the building was inscribed on the UNESCO World Heritage List along with other buildings within Lyon's historic centre. In 2019, an InterContinental hotel opened in the renovated building.

== History ==
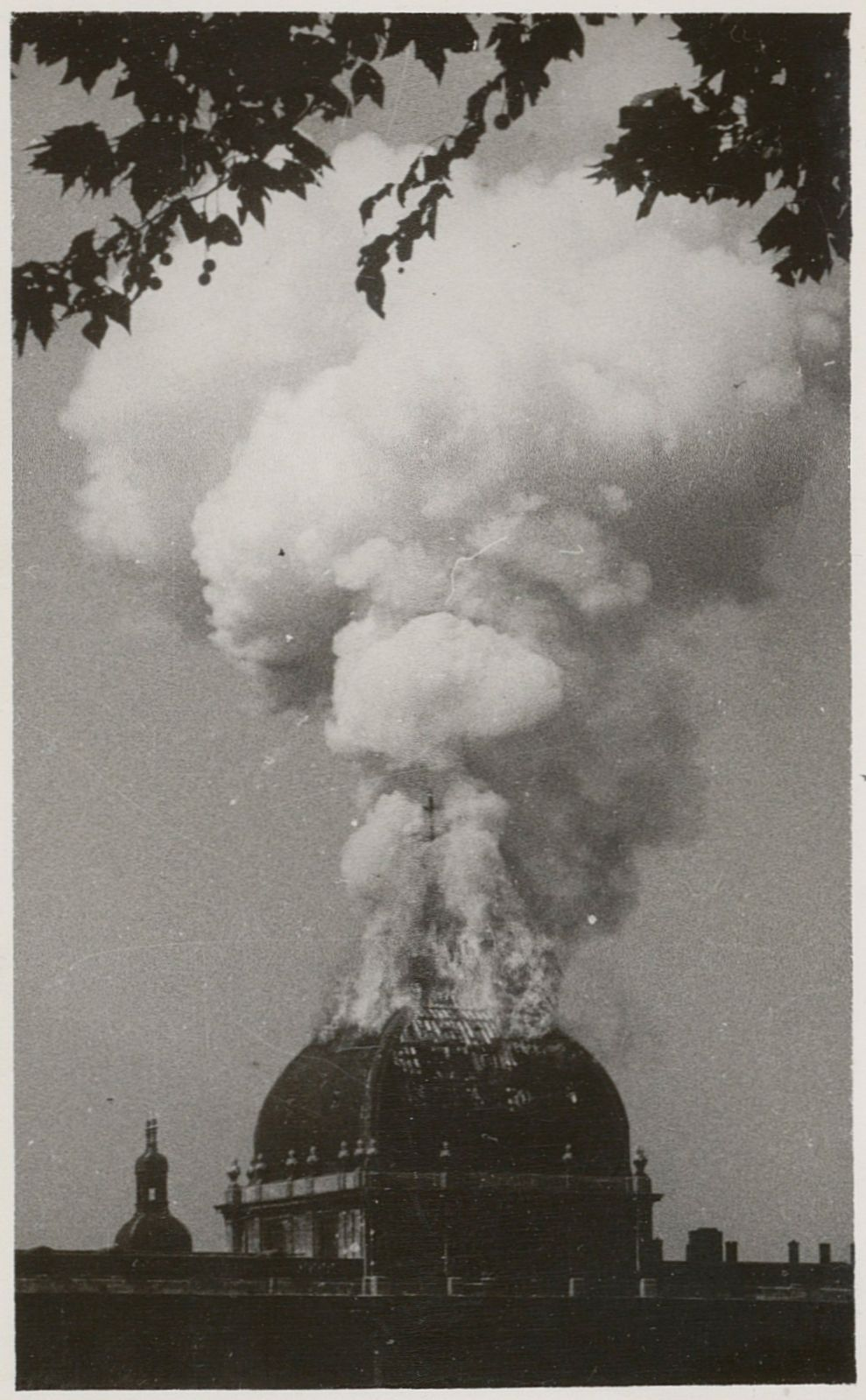
The Grand Dome in flames during the liberation of Lyon, September 1944

First erected in medieval times, the building originally served as the "Confrérie des frères pontifes" (est. 1184), a pontifical meeting-place and refuge for both traveling and local members of the clergy. However, when the first doctor Maître Martin Conras was hired in 1454, 'Hôtel-Dieu' became a fully functional hospital, one of the most important in France. As Lyon was a city known for its trade and seasonal fairs, many of the early patients were weary travelers of foreign descent.

In 1532, 'Hôtel-Dieu' appointed former Franciscan/Benedictine monk-turned-doctor and great Humanist François Rabelais, who would write his Gargantua and Pantagruel during his tenure here. Renaissance poet Louise Labé lived just beyond the western limits of the building.

The Hôtel-Dieu also had as a practitioner in the 1530s and 1540s, Pierre Tolet who was one of the promoters of the French language in medicine.

Massive expansion projects in the 17th century by Guillaume Ducellet (under Louis XIII and Cardinal Richelieu) and in the 18th century by Jacques-Germain Soufflot (under Louis XIV and Jean-Baptiste Colbert) replaced the original building with the grandiose wings and courts we know today. In fact, at its greatest point, the hospital extended from its present position beyond Place Bellecour to engulf the area now occupied by the central post office.

'Hôtel-Dieu' houses the Museum of the Civil Hospices of Lyon, a permanent exhibit tracing the history and practice of medicine from the Middle Ages to modern time and includes a fine collection of apothecary vases amongst other objects.

In May 2015, it was announced that the building, which ceased to function as a hospital in 2010, would be converted into a high-end shopping and dining center. InterContinental Lyon - Hotel Dieu opened in 2019.

== Gallery ==
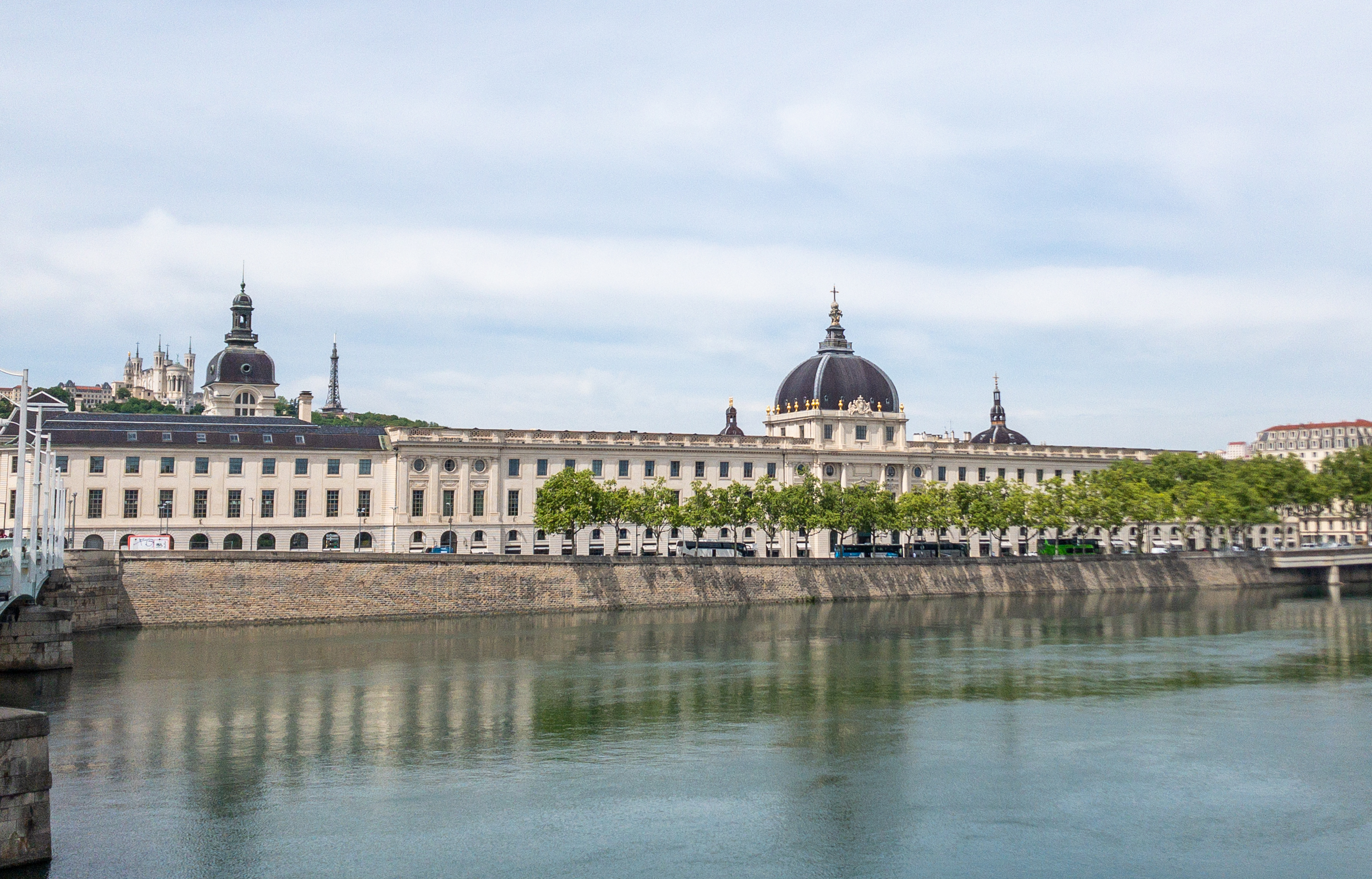
Exterior

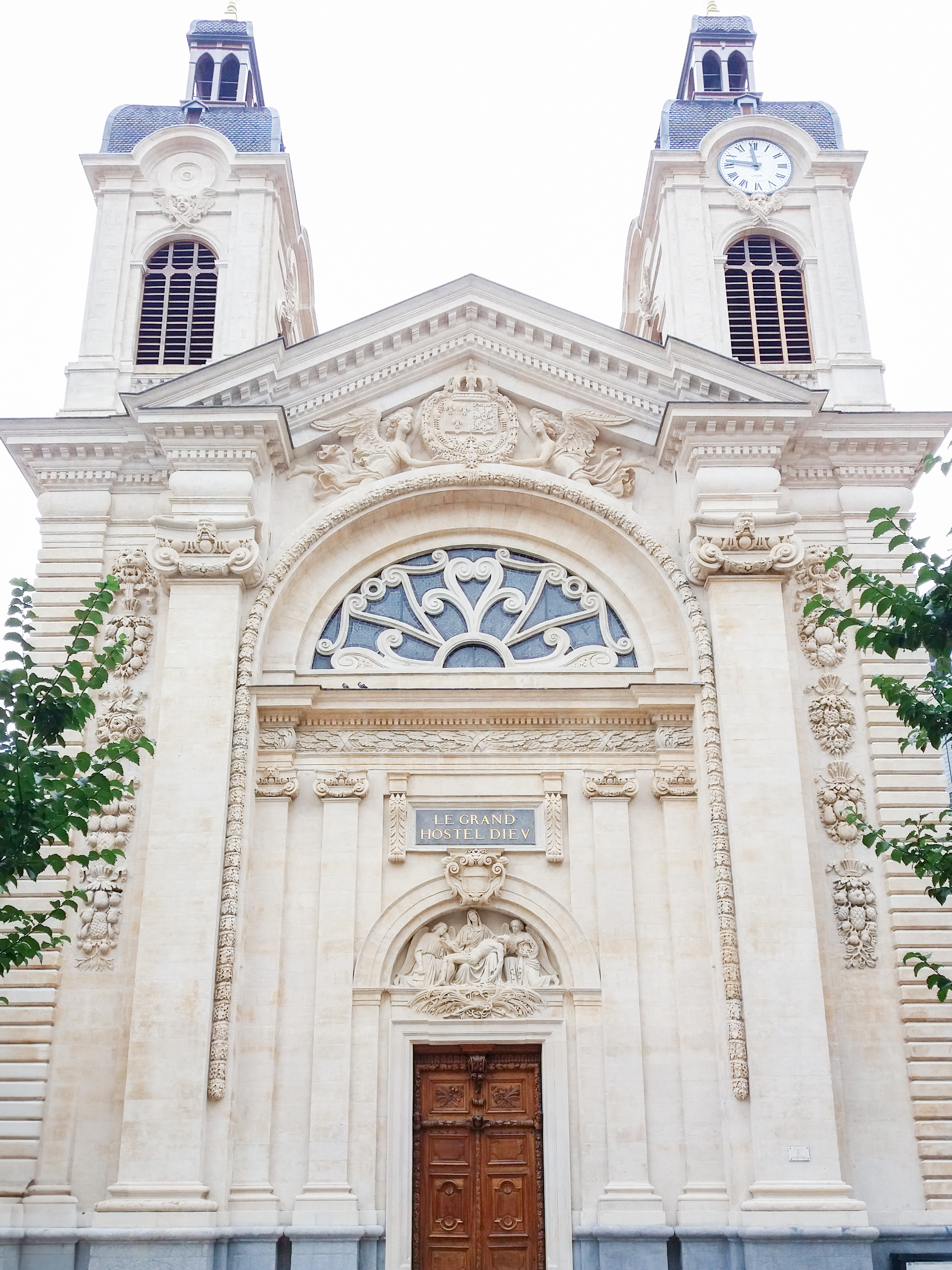
Chapel

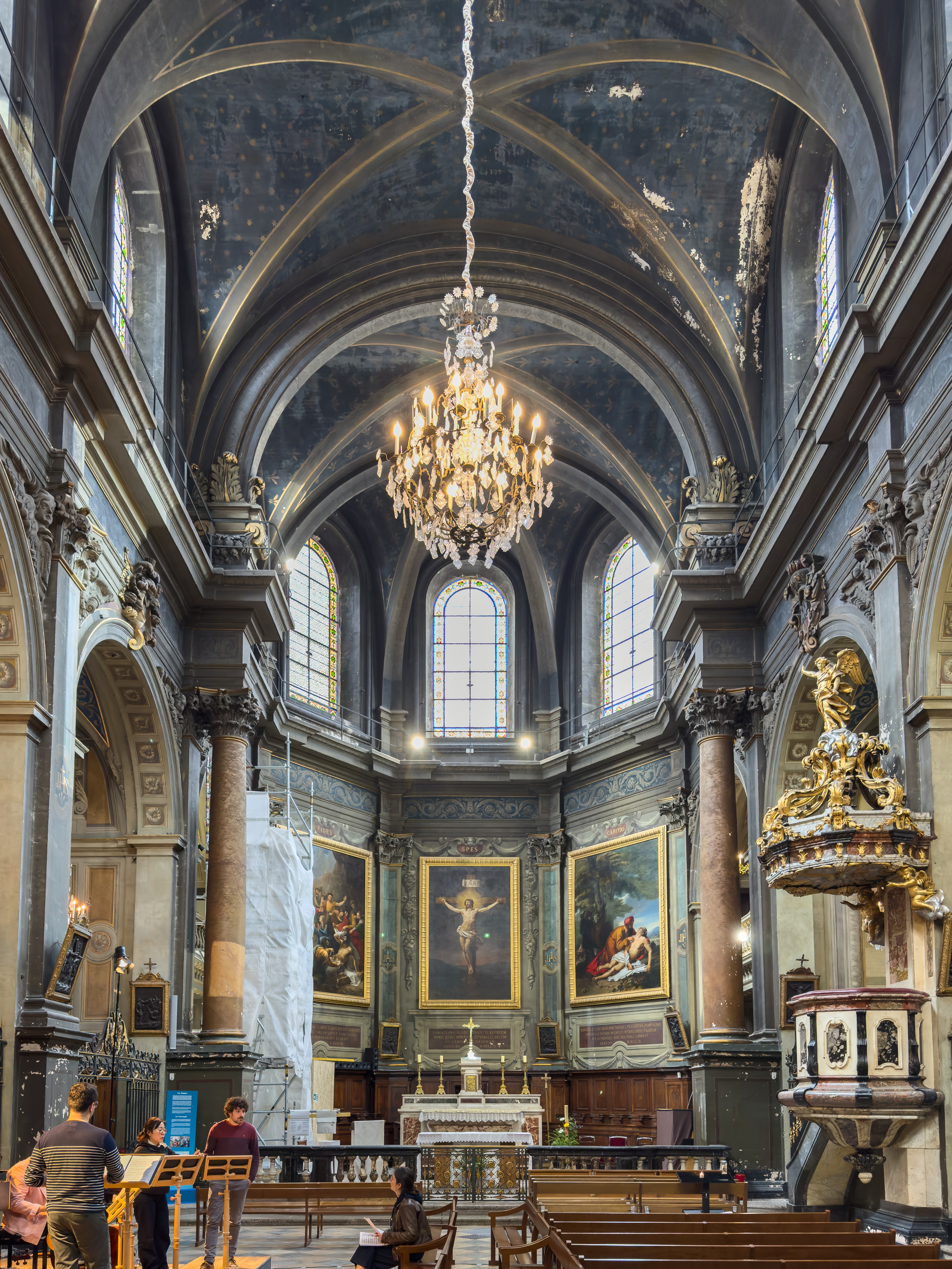
Chapel

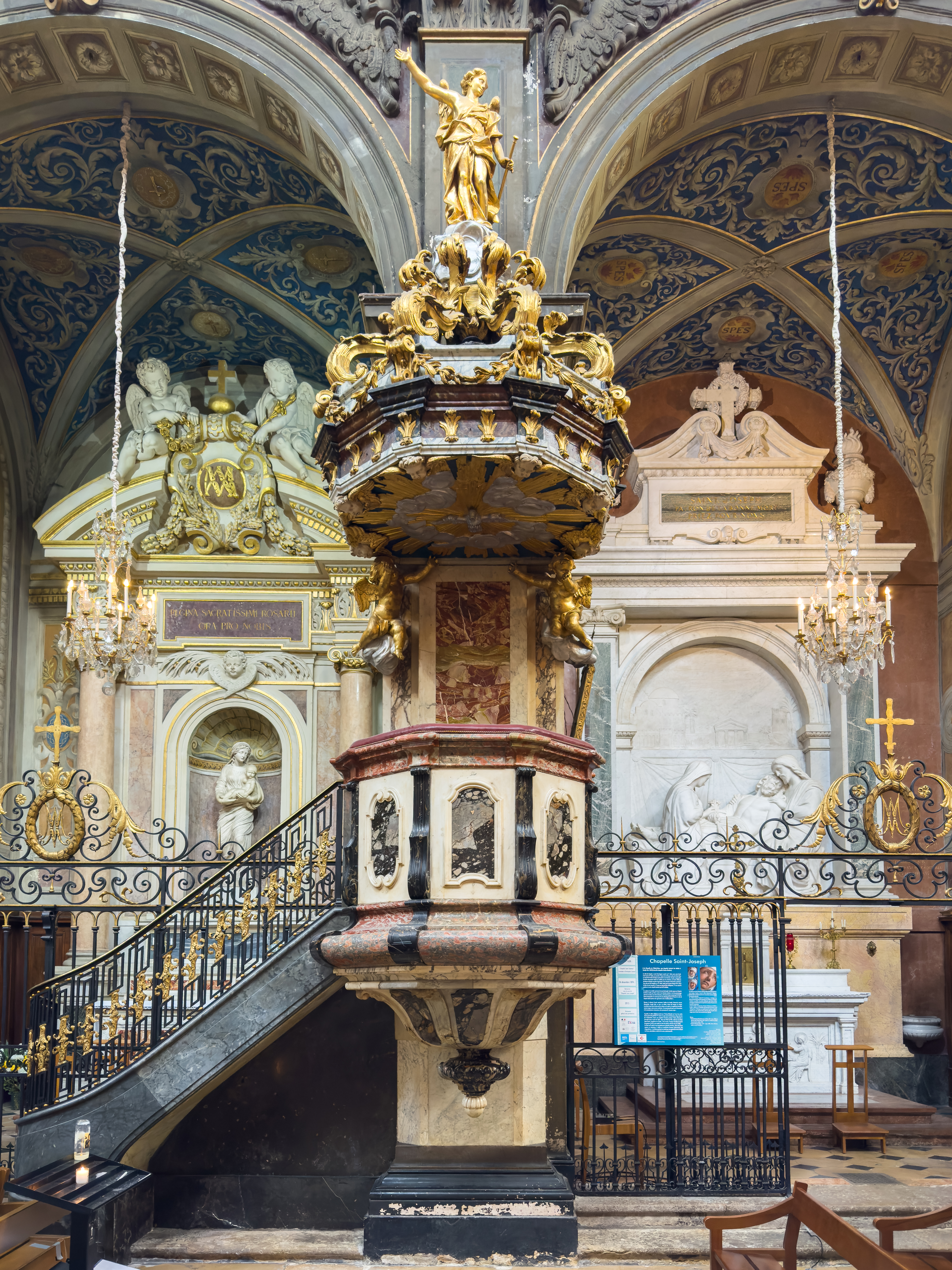
Chapel

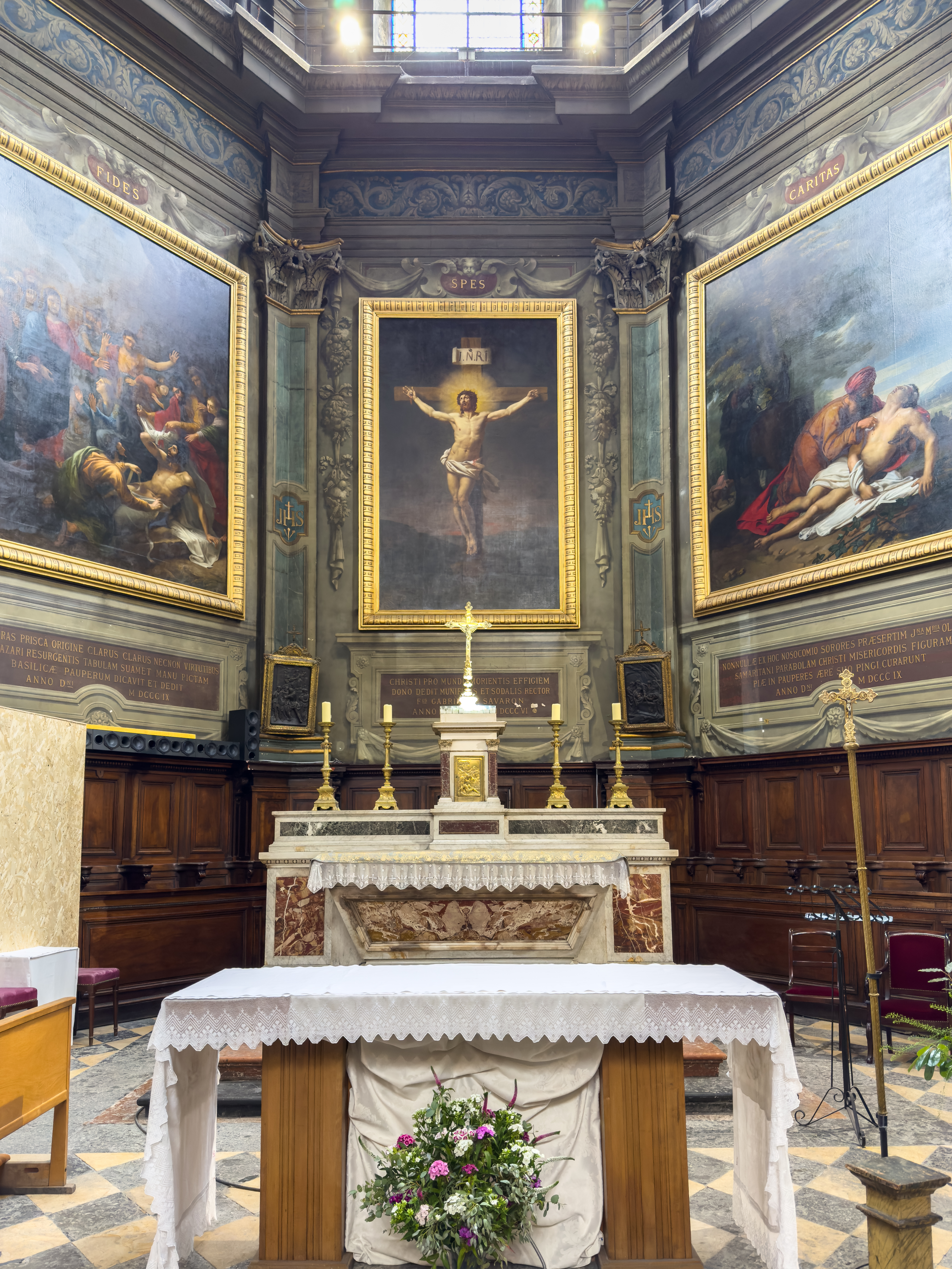
Chapel

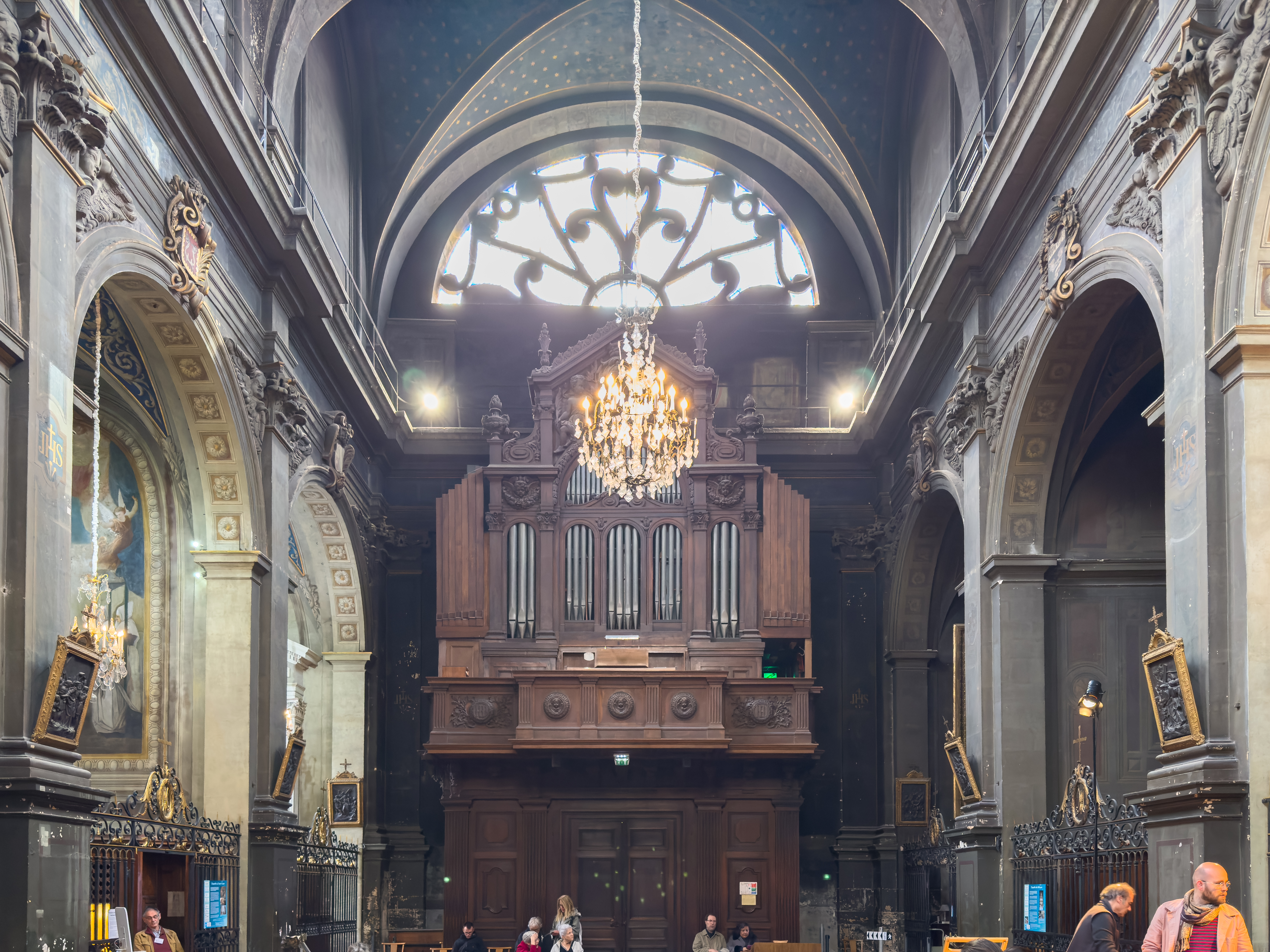
Chapel

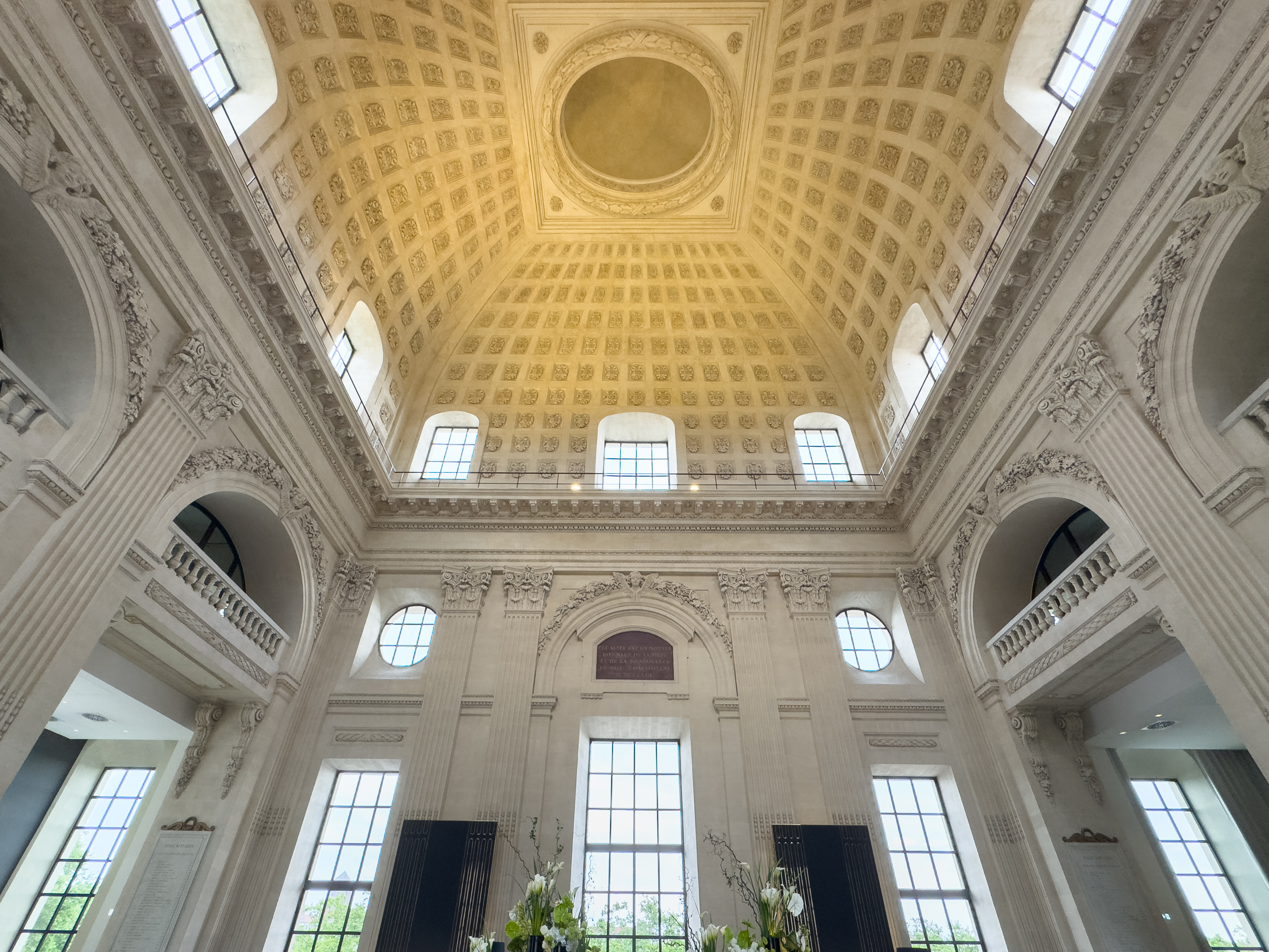
Le Dôme

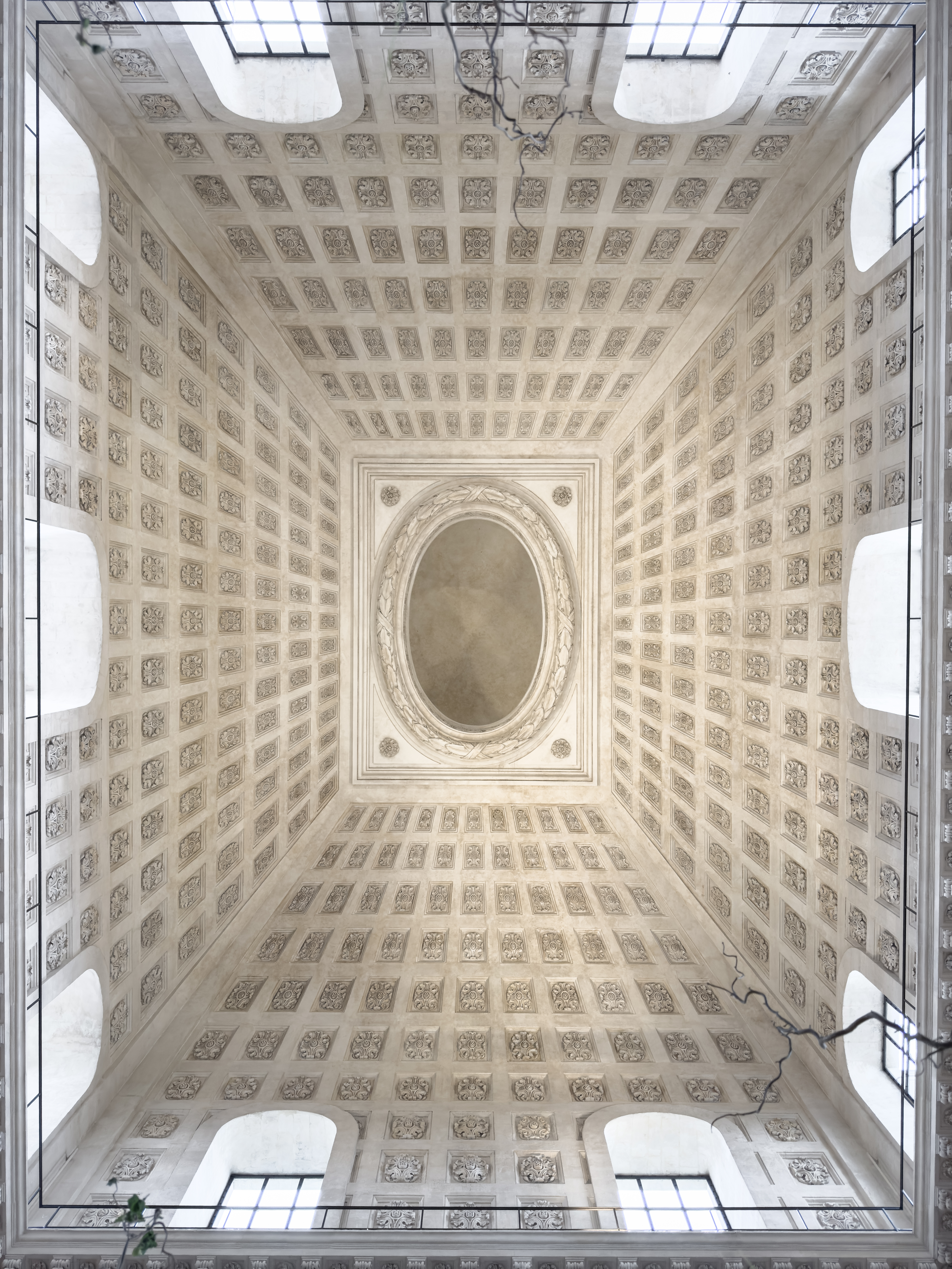
Le Dôme

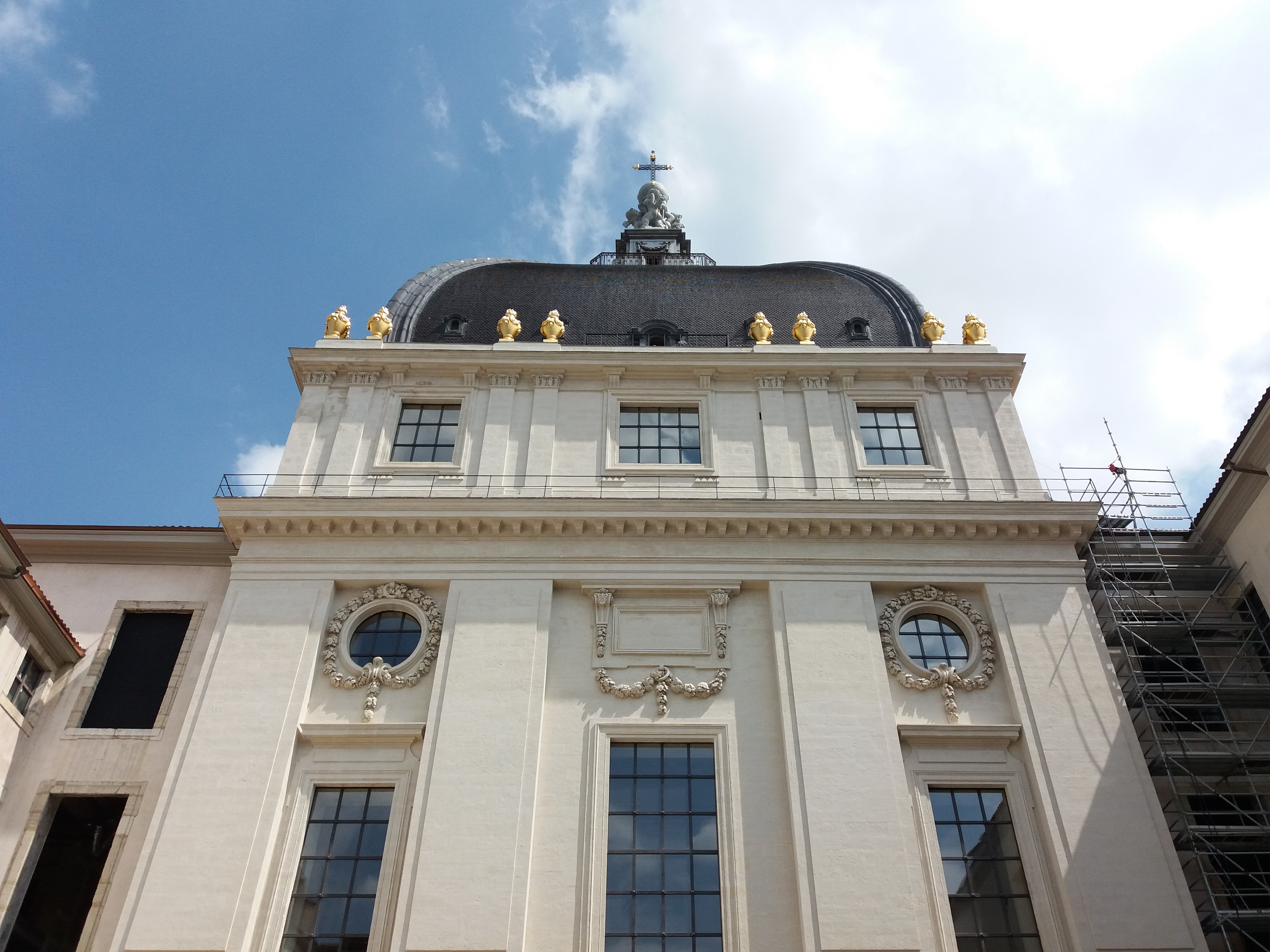
Façade sur Cour Saint-Henri

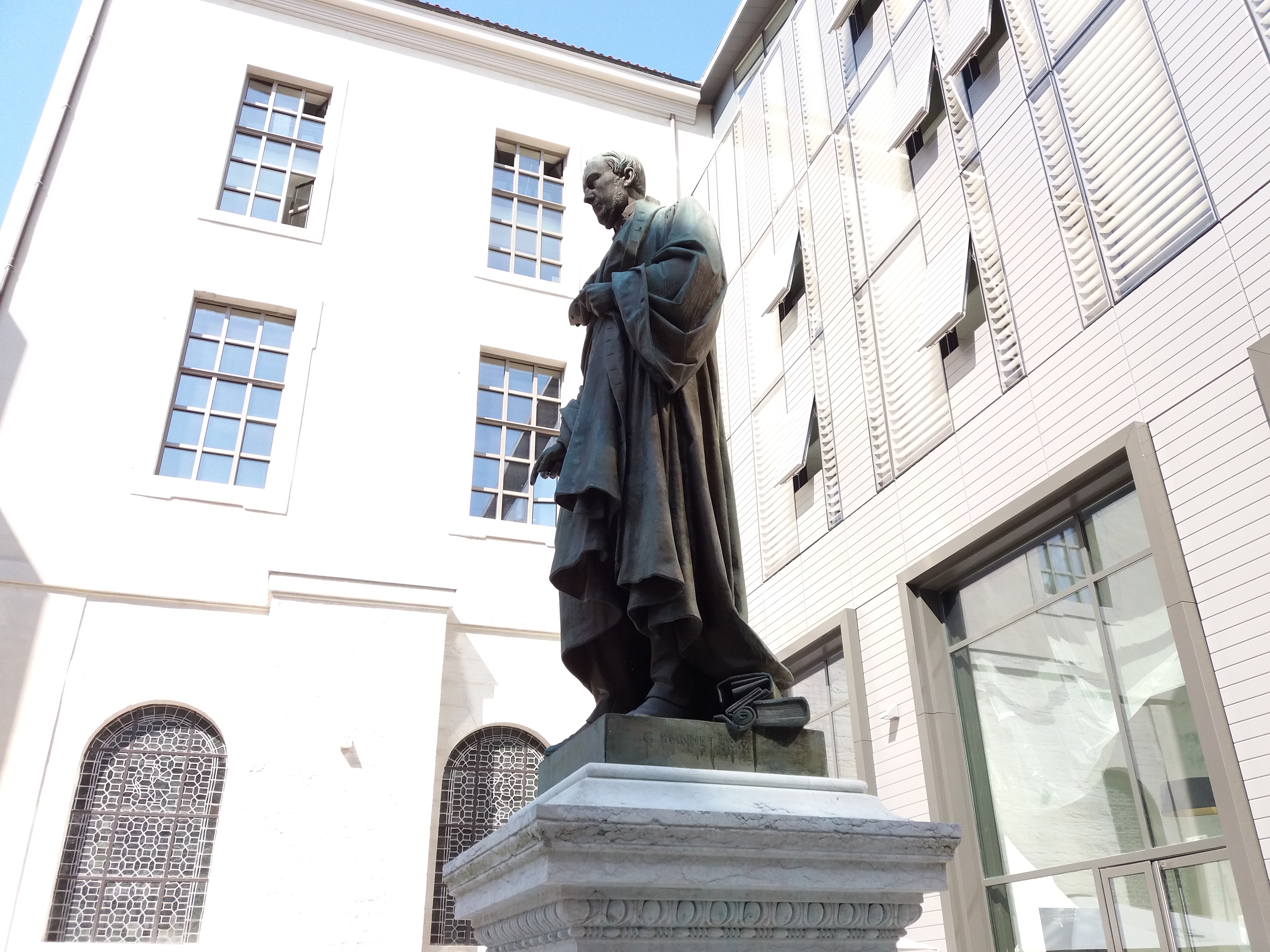
Statue d'Amédée Bonnet

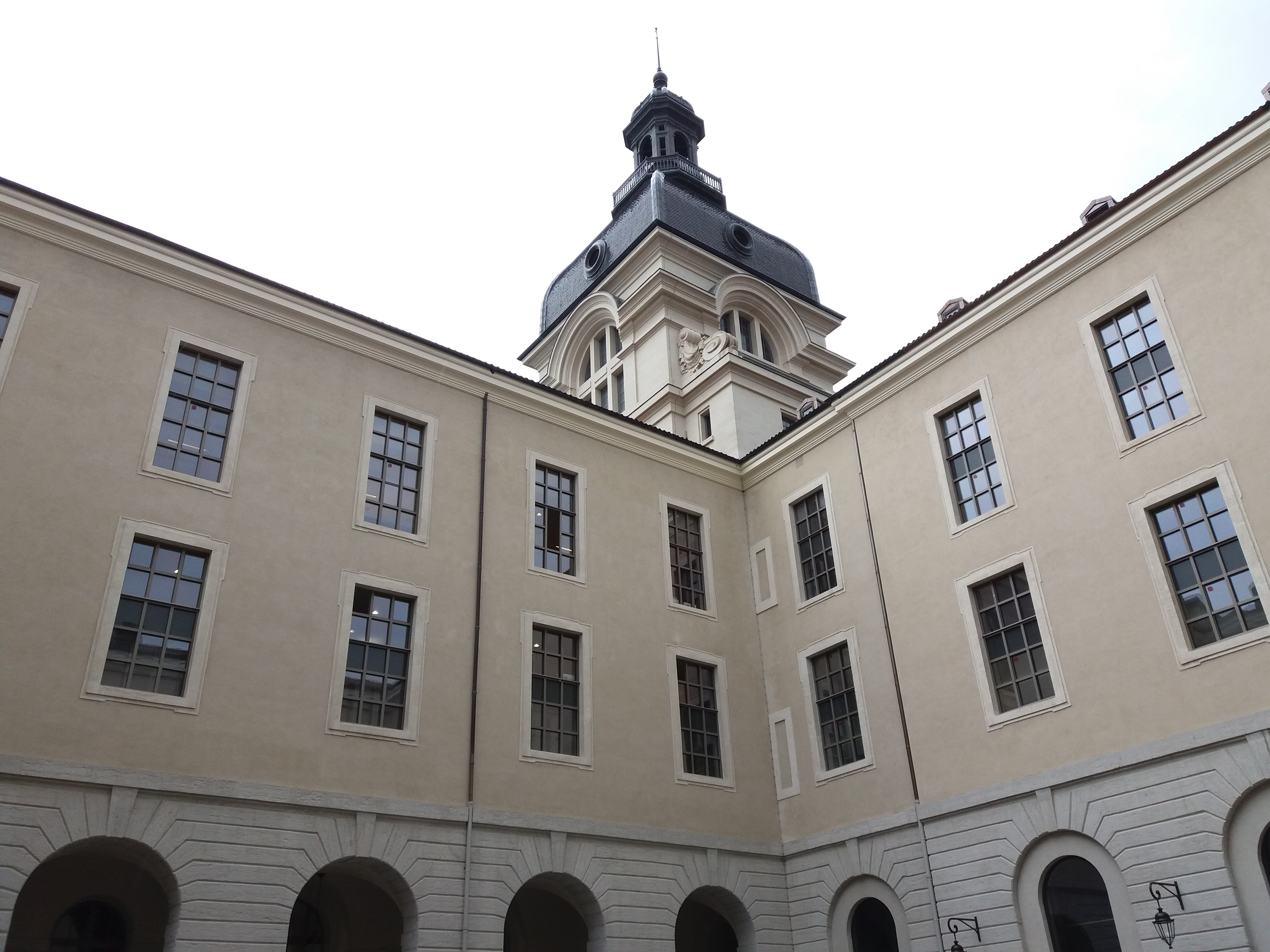
Façade sur Cour Saint-Martin

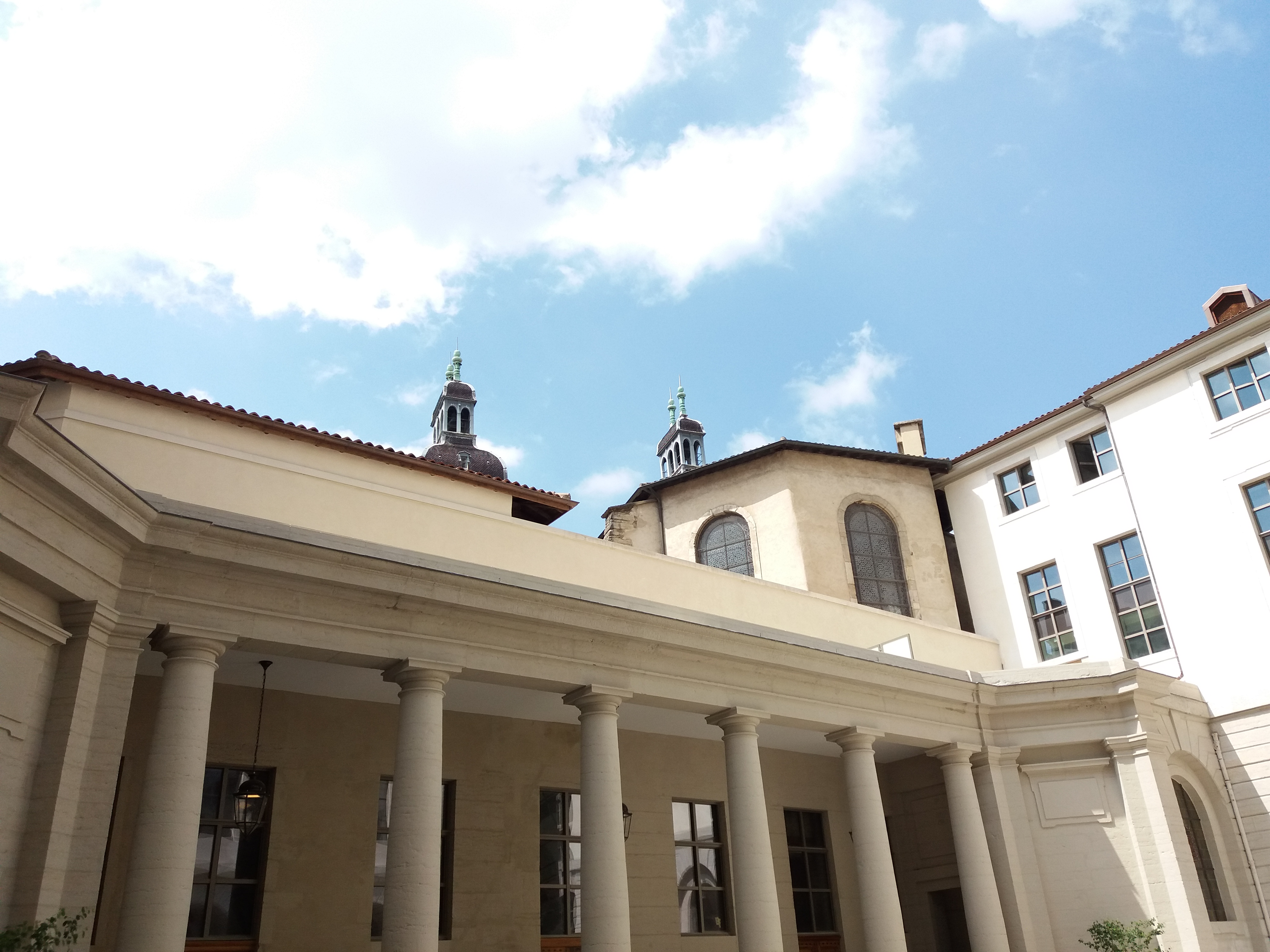
Façade sur Cour Saint-Henri

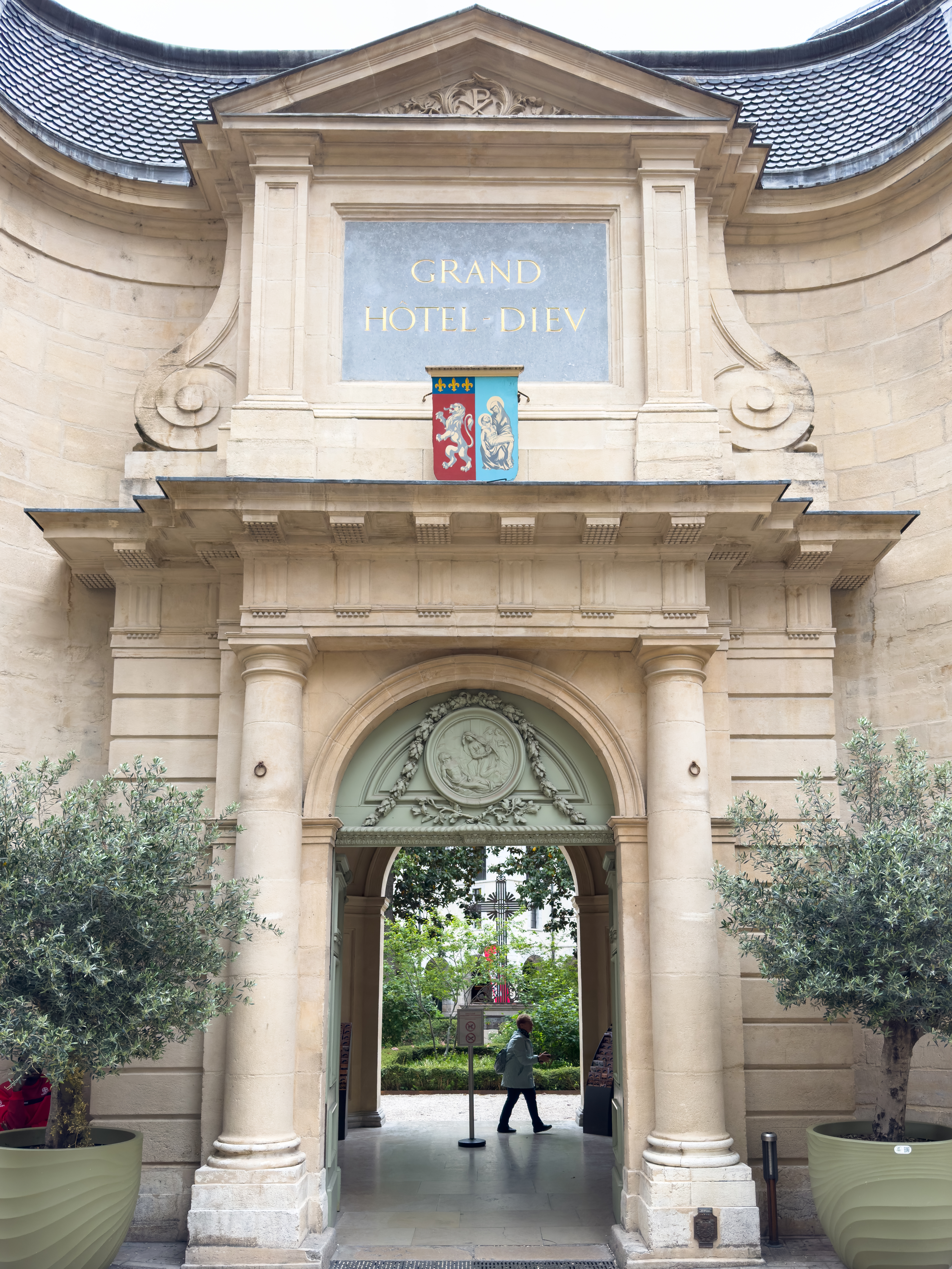
Entrée cour d'honneur

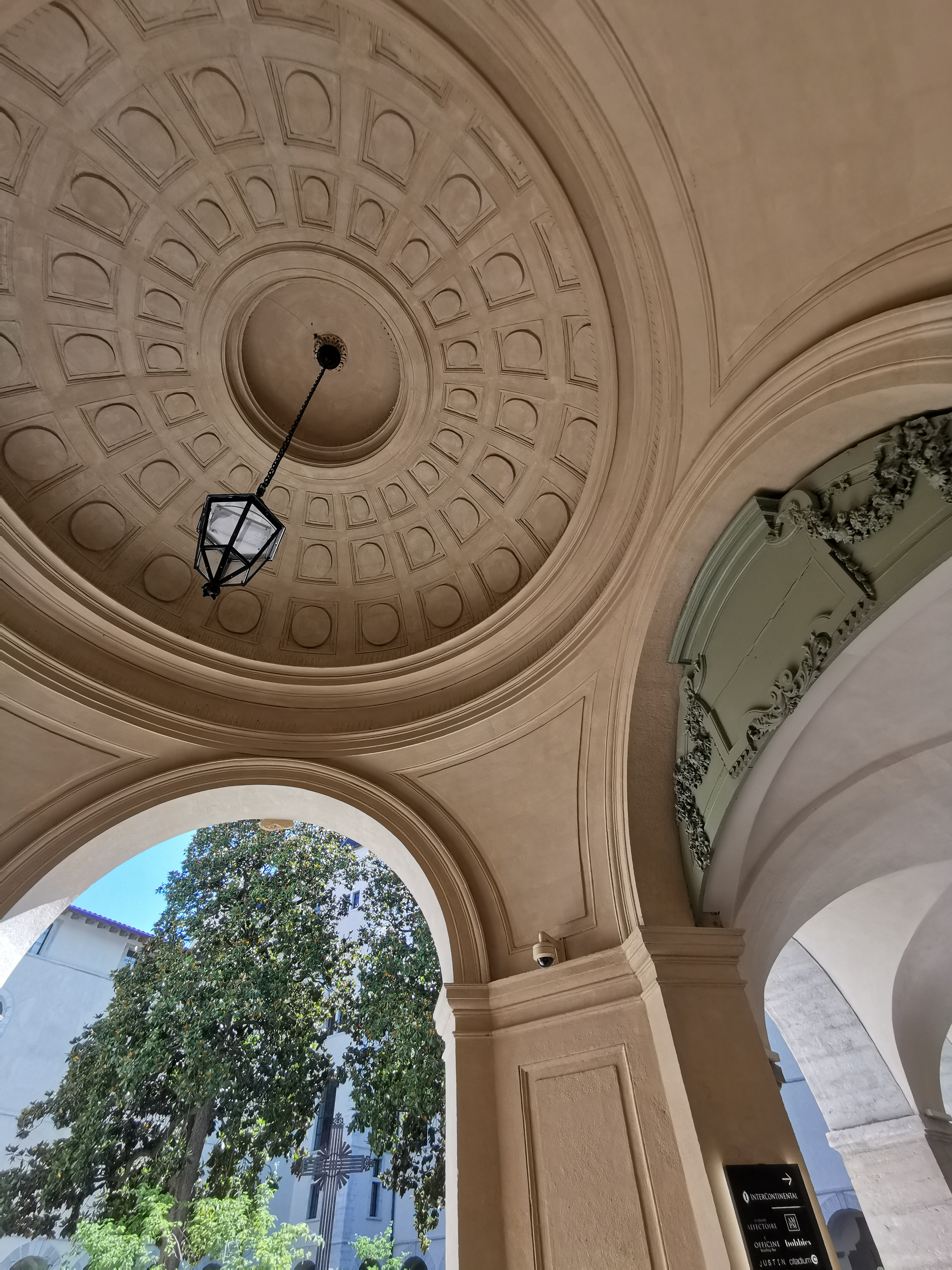
Dome de l'entrée vue intérieure

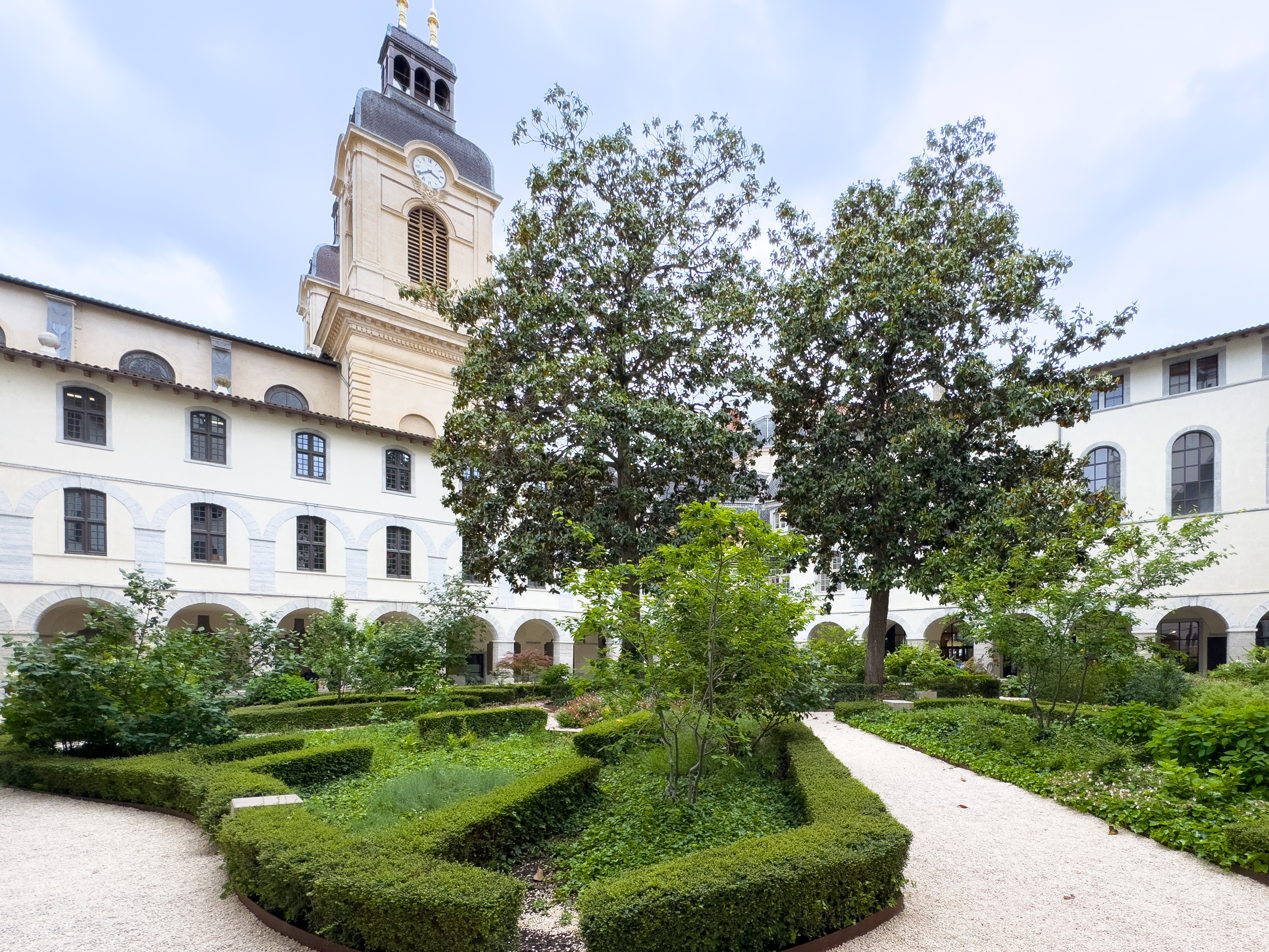
Cour d'honneur arborée et plates-bandes fleurie

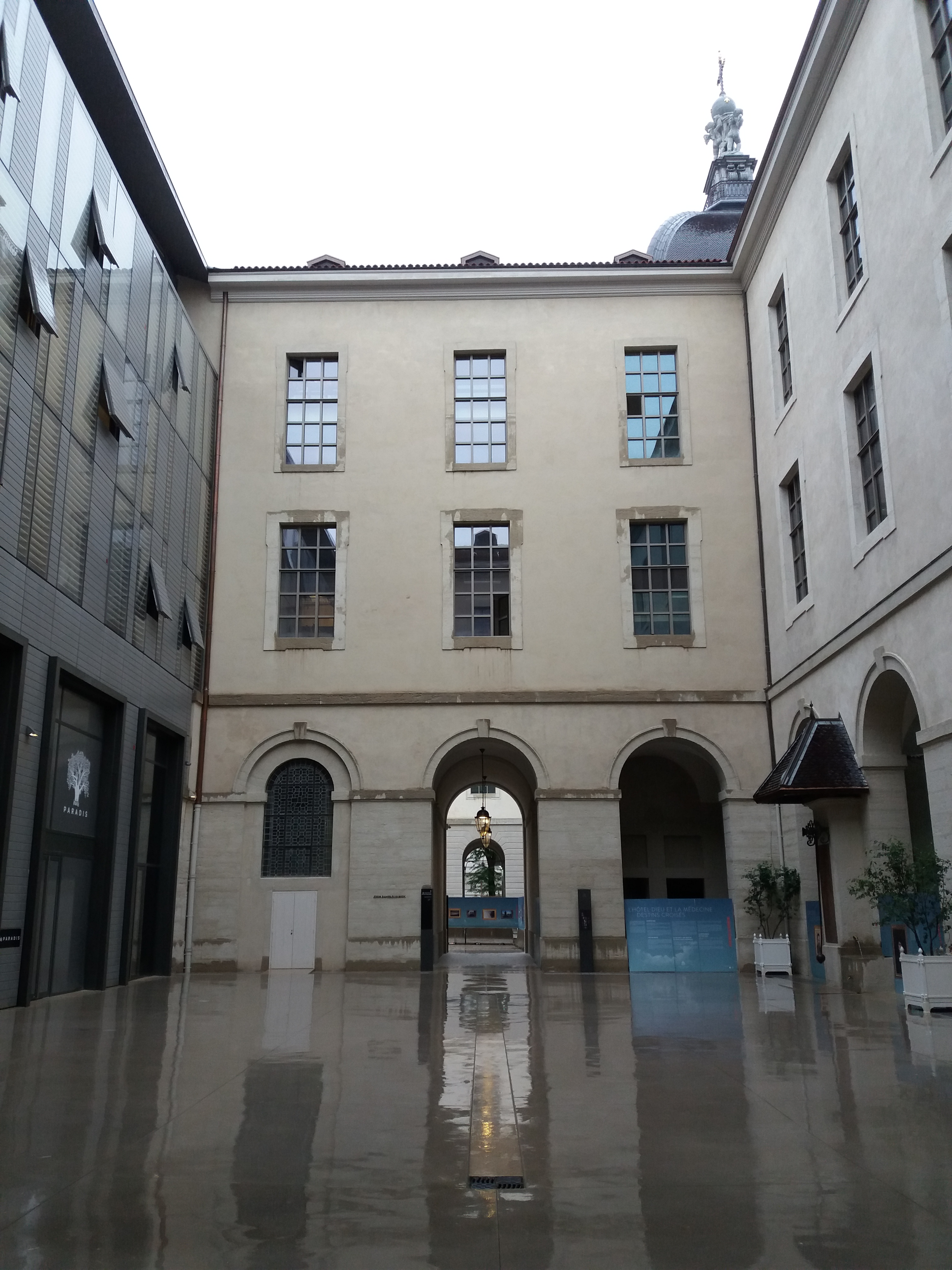
Cour Sainte-Élisabeth

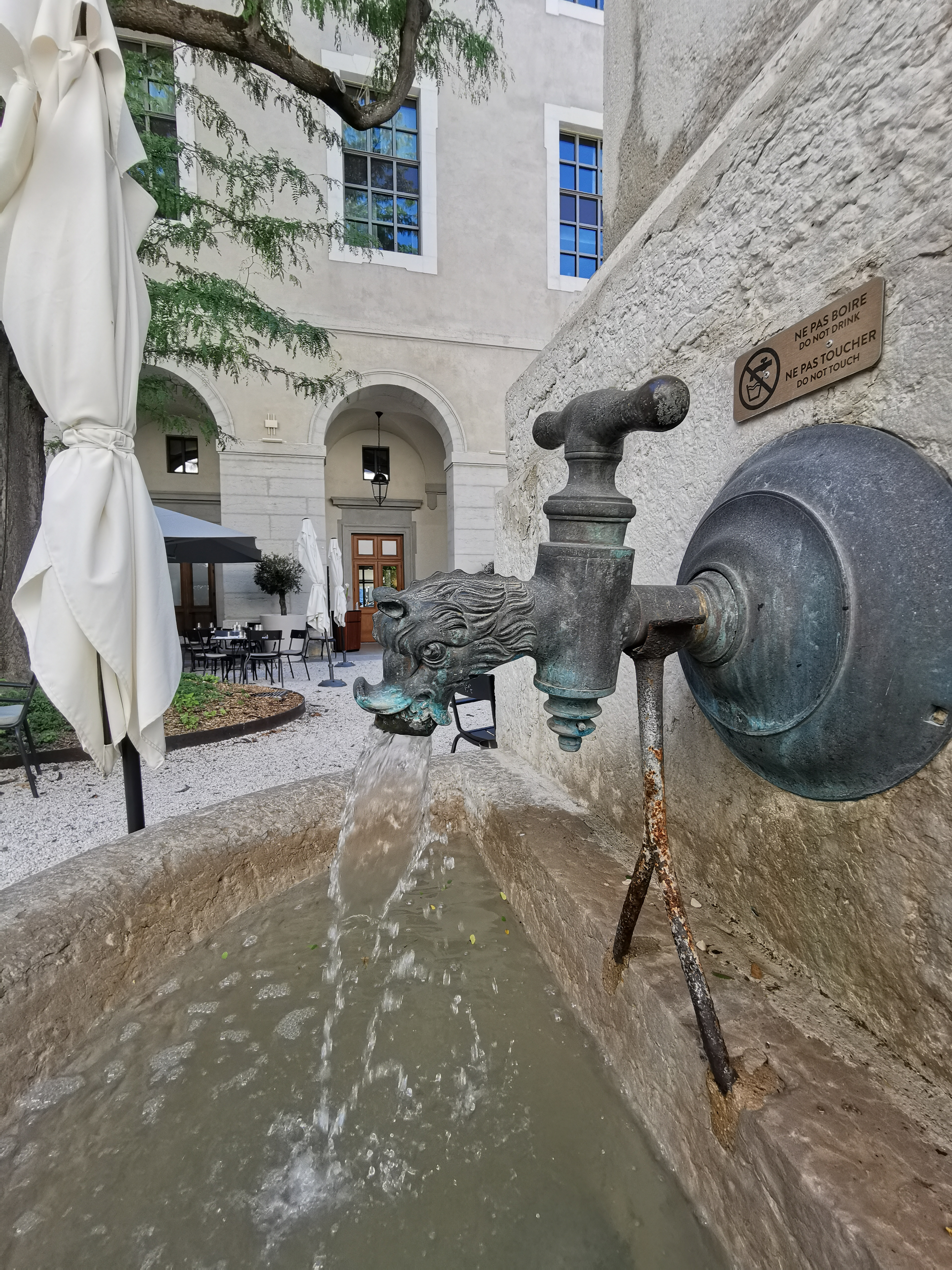
Ornamentation d'une fontaine cour intérieure

== See also ==
- History of Lyon
