= Barthélemy Aneau =

French poet

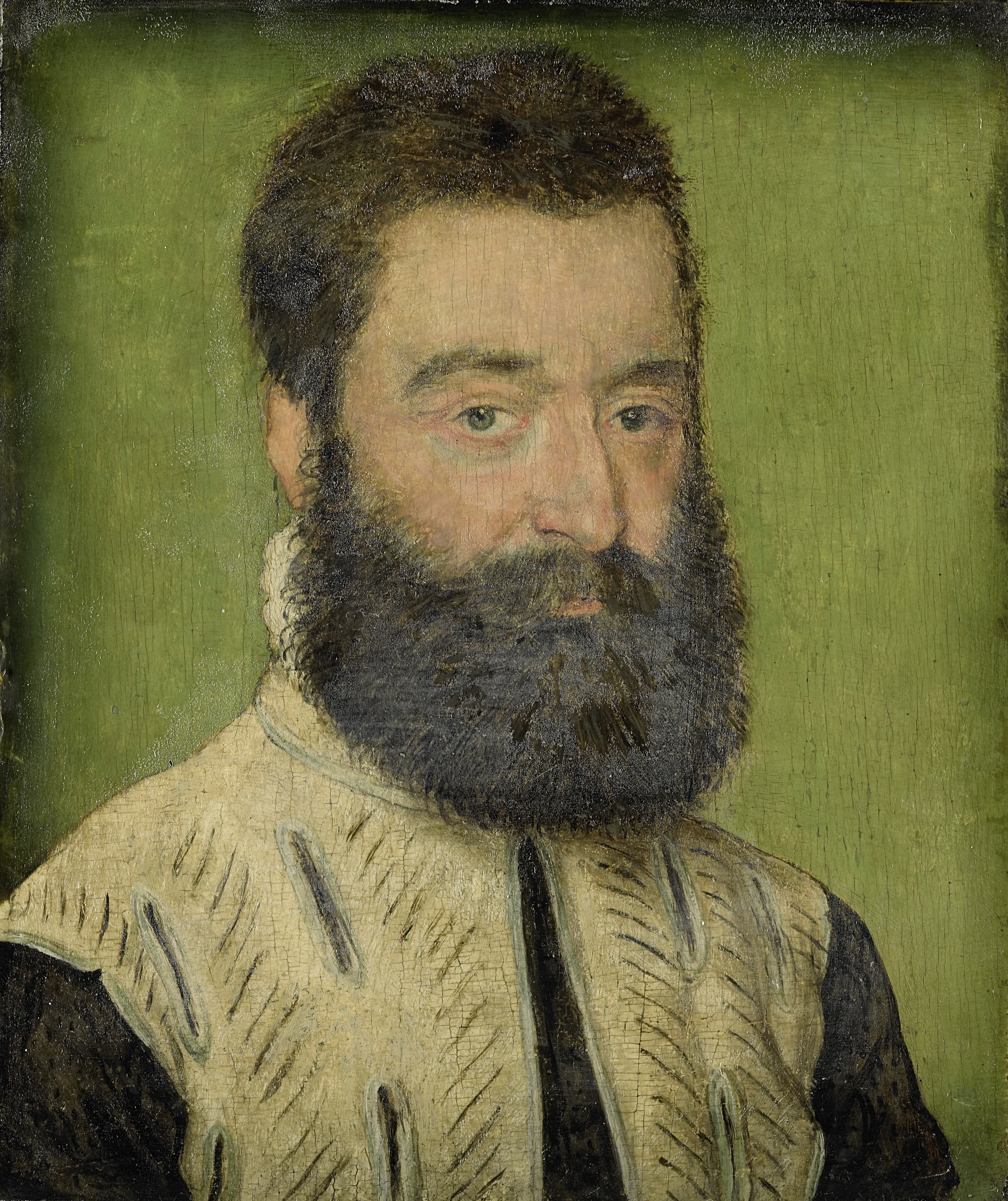
Portrait of Barthélemy Aneau (1545)

Barthélemy Aneau (c.1510–1561) was a French poet and humanist. He is known for his novel Alector, ou le coq, and his work on emblems.

He was born in Bourges but later moved to Lyon where he became regent, then principal of the Collège de la Trinité. In Lyon, he was part of the cultural life of the city and of a cenacle of scholars (Maurice Scève, Pierre Tolet) who were working to promote new reflections on poetic language.

He wrote both French and Latin poetry. His works include:

- Emblemes, a French verse translation of the emblem book of Andre Alciato (Lyon, 1549);
- Quintil Horatian (Lyons, 1551), anonymous attack on Joachim du Bellay;
- a series of Latin poems in his own emblem book, Picta poesis (1552), called Imagination poétique in his own French translation, in which Classical stories are given a practical and moral reinterpretation;
- Alector ou le coq, a fantasy story (Lyon, 1560).

He was killed in 1561, during riots in Lyon, in or near the college. He was suspected of Protestantism.
