= Maurice Scève =

French poet

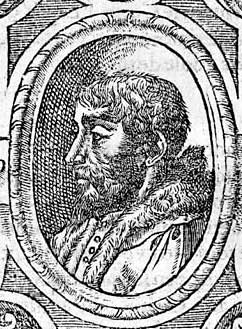
Maurice Scève

Maurice Scève (c. 1501 – c. 1564) was a French poet active in Lyon during the Renaissance period. He was the centre of the Lyonnese côterie that elaborated the theory of spiritual love, derived partly from Plato and partly from Petrarch. This spiritual love, which animated Antoine Héroet's Parfaicte Amye (1543) as well, owed much to Marsilio Ficino, the Florentine translator and commentator of Plato's works.

Scève's chief works are Délie, objet de plus haulte vertu (1544); five anatomical blazons; the elegy Arion (1536) and the eclogue La Saulsaye (1547); and Microcosme (1562), an encyclopaedic poem beginning with the fall of man. Scève's epigrams, which have seen renewed critical interest since the late 19th century, were seen as difficult even in Scève's own day, although Scève was praised by Du Bellay Bellay, Ronsard, Pontus de Tyard and Des Autels for raising French poetry to new, higher aesthetic standards.

== Life ==
Scève is believed to have been born in 1501. His father was a Lyonnese lawyer and municipal officer who served as Lyon's ambassador to the court upon the accession of François I to the throne, giving the family a strong social standing in the city.

The Lyonnese school, of which Scève was the leader, included his friend Claude de Taillemont, Barthélemy Aneau, the physician Pierre Tolet and the women writers Jeanne Gaillarde—placed by Clément Marot on an equality with Christine de Pisan—Pernette du Guillet, Louise Labé, Clémence de Bourges and the poet's sisters, Claudine and Sybille Scève.

== Work ==
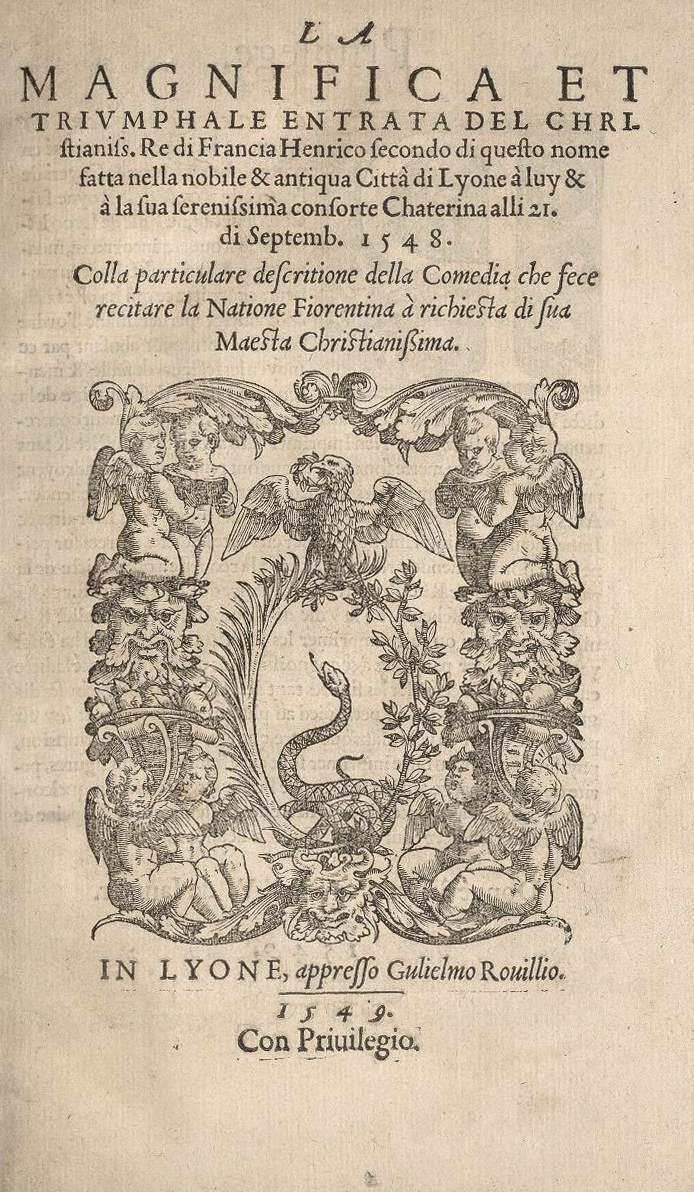
La magnifica et triumphale entrata del christianiss, 1549

Scève's first acclaim as a poet came in 1535, when he sent a pair of blasons to Marot in response to Le Blason du Beau Tétin. Le Sourcil ("The Eyebrow") and La Larme ("The Tear") were submitted as a part of a contest organized by Marot while in exile in Ferrara; the former was judged the winner, gaining notoriety for Scève in both France and Italy. These two poems were published along with others from the contest in 1536. Three additional Scève blasons (Le Front, La Gorge and Le Soupir) were published in the 1539 edition.

Délie, Scève's most notable work, consists of 449 dizains (10-line epigrammes) preceded by a dedicatory huitain (8-line poem) to his mistress ("A sa Délie"). The title is sometimes understood to be an anagram for l'idée ("the idea"). Délie is the first French "canzoniere" or poetic collection modeled after Petrarch's immensely-popular Canzoniere, a series of love poems addressed to a Lady.

Scève was also responsible for the translation of a sentimental novel, Grimalte y Gradissa by Juan de Flores, published as La Déplorable fin de Flamète in 1535, which was inspired by Giovanni Boccaccio.

Scève was a well versed musician as well as a poet; he cared very much for the musical value of the words he used, in this and in his erudition he forms a link between the school of Marot and the Pléiade.

== Selected works ==
=== English translation ===
- Emblems of Desire: Selections from the "Délie" of Maurice Scève, Richard Sieburth, Editor and Translator. (University of Pennsylvania Press, 2002) ISBN 0-8122-3694-7

== See also ==
- Enzo Giudici
- Louise Labe
