= Pernette Du Guillet =

French poet

Pernette Du Guillet (c.1520 – July 7, 1545) was a female French poet of the Renaissance.

She was born into a noble family in Lyon and got married in 1537-38 to a man with the last name Du Guillet.

In the spring of 1536, she met the poet Maurice Scève (she was 16; he was 35), and she would serve as Scève's poetic muse, inspiring his Délie.

From this work has come the reputation of her beauty and significant culture. She lived in Lyon, which was culturally blooming during her lifetime.

After her death, her poetry was published in Rymes de Gentille et Vertueuse Dame, Pernette du Guillet.

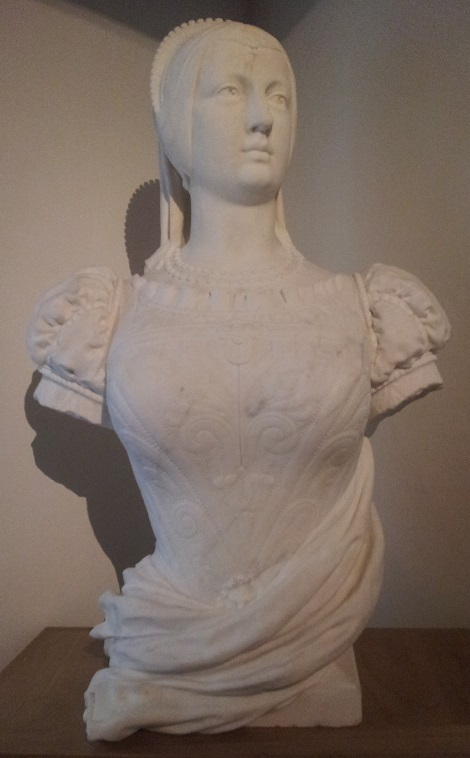
Pernette Du Guillet, was a female French poet.

== See also ==
- Louise Labé
