= Pierre Tolet =

French physician

Pierre Tolet or Petrus Toletus (circa 1502 - circa 1580) was a French physician who, together with Jean Canappe contributed to the transmission of medical and surgical knowledge in French.

== Biography ==
Originally from the diocese of Béziers, he studied medicine at the Faculty of Montpellier under Jean Schyron. He graduated in 1529 along with Nostradamus, Jacobus Sylvius and Guillaume Rondelet.

He practised in Vienne, Bourg and then in Lyon where he became a physician at the Hôtel-Dieu. As Dean of the Faculty of Lyon, he introduced a French-language teaching programme with daily visits by students to the hospital and created a single training course for physicians, barbers surgeons and apothecaries.

A friend of Rabelais, he was also a leading figure in Lyon's cultural life and a member of a cenacle of scholars (Barthélemy Aneau, Maurice Scève,...) who were working to promote new reflections on poetic language.

He is quoted in the third book of Pantagruel, chapter 34:

“Je ne vous avois oncques puys veu que jouastez à. Monspellier avecques nos antiques amys Ant. Saporta, Guy Bouguier, Balthasar Noyer, Tollet, Jan Quentin, François Robinet, Jan Perdrier et François Rabelais, la morale comoedie de celluy qui avoit espousé une femme mute.”

— Rabelais, The Third Book, chap.34

He died of plague around 1580.

== Works ==
He was one of the translators like Jean Canappe and Guillaume Chrestien who introduced France to the physicians of antiquity. He translated in French the sixth book on surgery of the Medical Compendium in Seven Books by Paul of Aegina and various opuscules by Galen.

Latin remained the language of knowledge, but translations of the great ancient authors (Galen, Hippocrates) then appeared to accompany the development of medical knowledge and the publication of works. Against some doctors who thought that the translation of ancient Latin works into French would distort medicine, these humanist doctors argued that translation into the vernacular would, on the contrary, allow new progress in health and public health: barber-surgeons could add to their manual skills, an ancient surgical knowledge confronted with their actual practice.

"If you want a servant to follow your orders, you can't give them in an unknown tongue."

— Pierre Tolet

New problems appeared in war surgery, without equivalent in the past: wounds caused by firearms and mutilations caused by artillery, the barber-surgeon being required to treat all the affections appearing on the surface of the body, the doctor treating those on the inside.

There was already social mobility between surgeons and barber-surgeons. A surgeon's apprenticeship began with the practice of shaving. The young surgeon could thus have a source of income before mastering the surgery of his time. In the context of Renaissance humanism, this practical experience took place outside of academic scholasticism. The action is clearly sanctioned by the results, visible to all. For Michel de Montaigne, compared to medicine,

“Surgery seems to me much more certain, because it sees and handles what it does; there is less to conjecture and guess.”

== Bibliography ==
- Durand de Villegagnon, Nicolas; Tolet, Pierre (1874). Relation de Charles-Quint contre Alger suivie de la traduction du texte latin par Pierre Tolet (in French). Alger: Juillet-St-Lage.
- Des tumeurs oultre le coustumier de nature (1543)
- Paradoxe de la faculte du vinaigre, contre les escrits des Modernes, ou plusieurs choses sont demonstrees non eslongnees de la vérité (in French). Lyon: Jean de Tournes. 1549.
- Actio judicialis ad Senatum Lugdunensem in unguentarios pestilentes, et nocturnos fures, qui civitatem in praedam sibi proposuerant (in Latin). Lyon. 1577.
