= Clémence de Bourges =

French poet, woman of letters

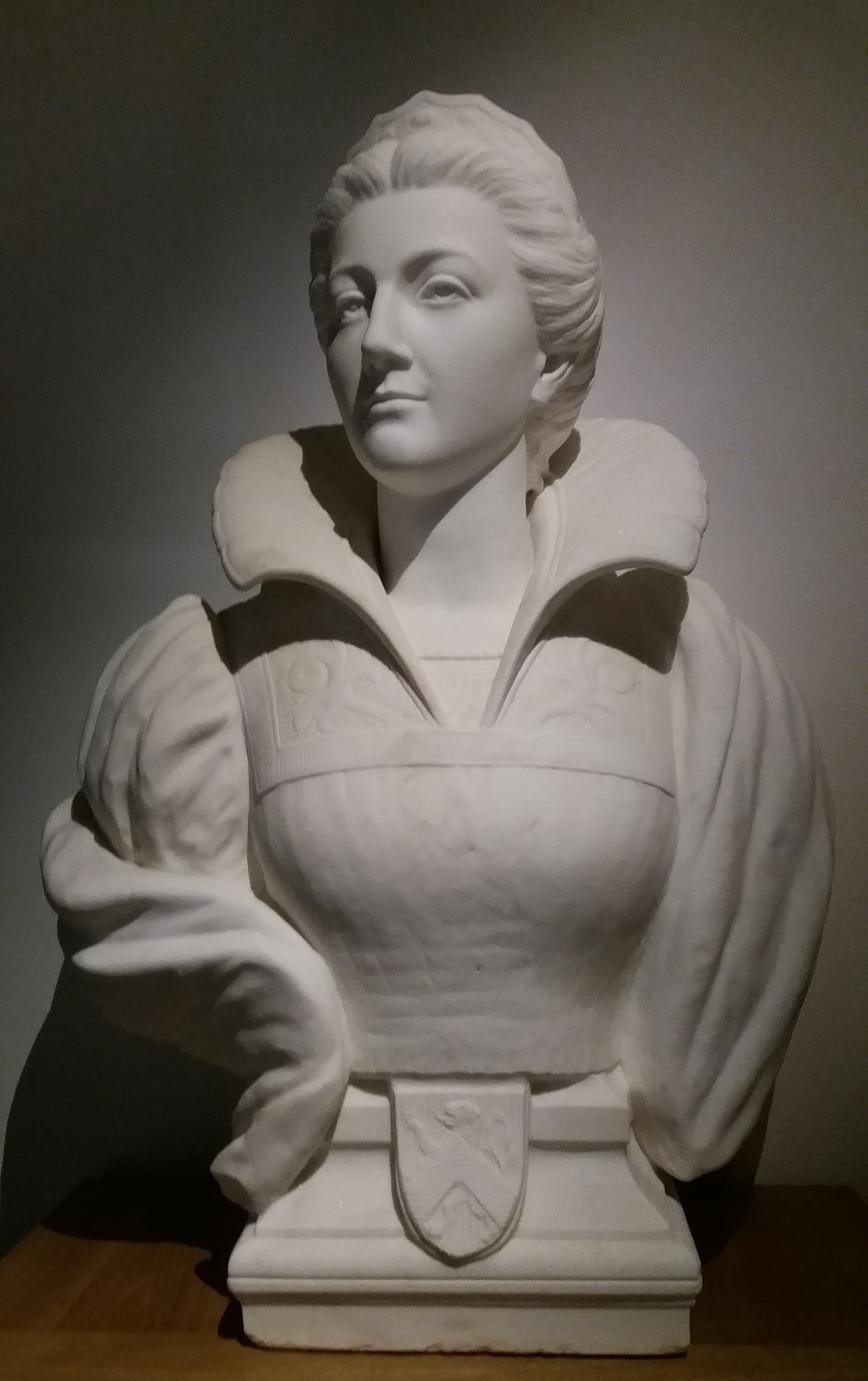
A Scepter of Clémence de Bourges

Clémence de Bourges (c.1530 – c.1563) was a French poet and noblewoman, and a literary figure of the Renaissance.

Clémence was the daughter of Claude de Bourges, seigneur of Mions in the Dauphiné; Claude was the lieutenant-general of finance for Piedmont and an official of the city of Lyon. Clémence belonged to the literary circle that gathered around Maurice Scève, Lyon's leading poet. Her own work has not survived, though it was still known in the mid-18th century, and she is now remembered mainly through the praises recorded by her contemporaries.

Clémence had been due to marry Jean du Peyrat, a Lyonnaise nobleman who died during the siege of Beaurepaire by Protestant forces in 1561/2; it is claimed that she afterwards died of grief and shock.

Another female poet of the era, Louise Labé, dedicated her collected works to Clémence in 1555, subsequently lamenting her early death, and Claude de Rubys, who also knew her, referred to her as "ceste perle vrayement orientale entre les damoiselles de Lyon". Louise's "epistre" to Clémence makes it clear that they were firm friends of long standing, despite apparent differences in age and social status.
