= Enzo Giudici =

Italian academic (1920–1985)

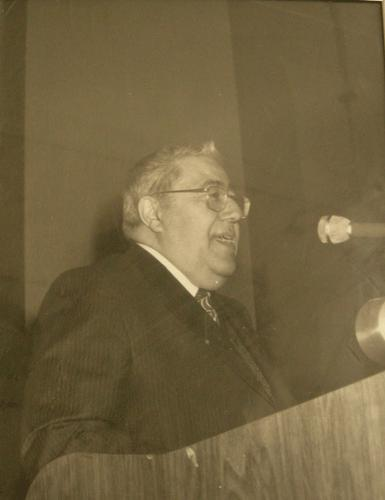
Enzo Giudici

Enzo Giudici (24 September 1920 – 4 October 1985) was an Italian academic who specialized in French Renaissance literature, particularly Louise Labé and Maurice Scève. Giudici was also a publicist often compared with fascism.

== Biography ==
Enzo Giudici was born in Mussomeli. He was the son of Isabella Sorce, a teacher, and Paolo Giudici, who was a writer. His mother died when he was 3 years old. At the age of 10, he left Sicily to live with his father in Piacenza, Pavia, Potenza, and Rome.

During his studies, he was close to the Gruppo Universitario Fascista.

During World War II, Giudici was not enrolled in the army due to health conditions. In that period, he contributed to Orizzonte, the official newspaper of the X^{a} MAS. Giudici also contributed to Fronte Unico, a "virulent" fascist weekly publication directed by Vito Videtta, a member of the extremist Pietro Koch's "gang".

In an article of December 1943, Giudici claimed that fascism was the negation of classes and individuals, and was characterized by totalitarianism and corporatism. Giudici also collaborated to "Libro e moschetto," the newspaper of the Gruppo Universitario Fascista. In April 1943, Giudici wrote an article in Universalità e nazionalità delle guerre (Universality and nationality of the wars), published by Libro e moschetto. In this article, Giudici wrote: "The present war is together a universal and national war, in which the values and the fate of the world are being determined - through our Italian national conscience. This fight is clearly between two centuries and two ideas, but though it is a fight between peoples, peoples do implement and represent ideas."

In 1944, during the Italian Social Republic, he debated with Roberto Farinacci on reforms in the magazine Repubblica fascista. He wrote an article in the Repubblica Sociale - a monthly review directed by Manlio Sargenti - on "socialized and corporative economy." (Note: (in Italian) Economia socializzata ed economia corporativa in Repubblica Sociale, novembre-dicembre 1944, p.19 reprinted in Repubblica sociale. 1989. OCLC 24305266.) The same year, Giudici also wrote a book on the socialization of corporations. (Note: (in Italian) La partecipazione operaia alla gestione e agli utili dell'azienda, 1944, OCLC 439548580.)

In 1946, he was the vice president of the executive board (vicepresidente dell consiglio direttivo) of the newly founded Movimento Italiano di Unità Sociale, which gathered the fascist elit and preceded the MSI.

In 1947, he collaborated with Il Pensiero nazionale a magazine directed by Stanis Ruinas with an aim to gather "ex fascists leaning to the left".

The Italian journalist Gino Raya had commented on Giudici's "sensitivity" towards the game of chess. Giudici's passion for chess resulted in his travel to chess tournaments, which led the movement for the introduction of the Elo rating system in Italy. Giudici also wrote an article (Note: (in Italian) l gioco degli scacchi nella letteratura: simbologia e retorica in Il « Minore » nella storiografia letteraria, 1984:397-425 OCLC 472143728.) on the figurative use of such in literature.

Giudici died in Rome on 4 October 1985. Following his death, his collection of over 20,000 books was passed on to the university of Salento.

== University positions ==
- Teaching assistant at the University of Toulouse 1957-1962.
- Professor of French Language and Literature at the university of Salento and at Naples Eastern university(1962–1965).
- Professor at the University of Macerata (1966–1982).
- Professor at the University of Rome Tor Vergata afterwards.

== Studies on the École de Lyon ==
His "prolific" academic interest centered on a French literary movement of the Renaissance called École de Lyon particularly Louise Labé (Note: (in Italian) Amore e Follia nell'opera della « Belle Cordière », 1965 OCLC 4268192.) (Note: (in Italian and French) Louise Labé, essai, 1981 OCLC 8101638, 123705566.) and Maurice Scève, (Note: (in Italian) Maurice Scève poeta della «Délie», I, 1965 OCLC 294196.) (Note: (in Italian) Maurice Scève poeta della «Délie», II, 1969, OCLC 310100842.) the possible discoverer of Laura de Noves' possible tomb, (Note: (in Italian) Bilancio di un'annosa questione: Maurice Scève e la « scoperta » della « tomba di Laura, 1980 OCLC 715861236.) highlighting, maybe exaggeratedly, Petrarch's influence. (Note: (in Italian) Maurice Scève traduttore e narratore, 1978 ISBN 978-88-7103-028-9.) In 1958 he published a critical edition of Scève's minor works (Note: (in Italian) Le opere minori di Maurice Scève, 1958,OCLC 630228899.) and in 1976, "the first proper critical edition" (Note: (in Italian and French) Maurice Scève, Microcosme, 1976, ISBN 2-7116-0014-9.) - though considered today partial and dated - of Microcosme, Scève's last work. In 1981, he published an erudite edition of Louise Labé works, (Note: (in French) Louise Labé, Œuvres complètes, 1981 ISBN 978-2-600-02562-1.) considered "solid" and "luxuriant", though it has been since deemed incomplete. His sometimes "exceedingly footnotish" editor work and search for documents have been more appreciated by some specialists, who praise his "density of information", than his literary analyses. In recognition of his contribution the renewal of interest in these poets, he was awarded for this work a prix d'honneur by the Académie des Sciences, Belles-Lettres et Arts de Lyon.

== Essays ==
Giudici was subject to criticism for his protracted relationship with fascism. In Memorie e pensieri di un cattedratico (Memories and Thoughts of a Professor), (Note: (in Italian) Memorie e pensieri di un cattedratico, 1974 OCLC 1949298.) he considers such evocations as false and vile confusions of culture with politics. He claims that fascism is a "controversial" term and that he does not trust "contemporary -isms". Though the Italian historian Carlo Vallauri noted that Giudici "never identified himself" with the MSI, an affinity, sometimes considered as the expression of a "new right" "non-conformism", transcures from his later positions on the student movements and on the culture of fascism.

In L' avvento dell'asinocrazia (The Upcoming Donkeycracy) (Note: (in Italian) L'avvento dell'asinocrazia, 1969 OCLC 6192991.) and Contestatori alla sbarra (Protesters at the Bar) (Note: (in Italian) Contestatori alla sbarra, 1972 OCLC 462041365.) he criticizes the student movement, which had started in Italy in 1967. His point of view has been considered by the historian Carlo Vallauri as "the clearer and most organic expression of the wholesome refusal to understand" this movement. The expression avvento dell'asinocrazia was first used in 1968 by Giovanni Sartori in an article published by the Corriere della Sera to characterize the student movement as a "triumph of the donkeys". In La scuola inutile (Note: (in Italian) La scuola inutile, 1972 OCLC 635773682.) (The ineffective school), initially entitled Asini allo spiedo per il pasto del barone (Jackass on the spit for big shots convenience), Giudici critics not only the "protestive" students, but also the "faint-hearted" political class.

In the late 1970s, Giudici contributed in the Secolo d'Italia, the newspaper of the MSI, to an ongoing debate on the culture of the fascist period. He questioned whether "fascism was only respectful of culture or itself productive of culture" (Note: (in Italian) Replica alle accuse di incultura o anticultura rivolte al fascismo in Comitato nazionale per il centenario della nascita di Benito Mussolini, 1986 ISBN 978-88-7518-100-0.) and underlined the link between "fascist culture and the tradition of Risorgimento and ancient Rome". These considerations are developed in Ricerche sulla cultura dell'era fascista (Research on culture of the fascist era), a book published in 1982. (Note: (in Italian) Ricerche sulla cultura dell'era fascista, 1982 OCLC 715944559) and in Riflessioni sulla cultura del periodo fascista (Note: Riflessioni sulla cultura del periodo fascista, 198-?) – published posthumously by Gaetano Rasi's Istituto di studi corporativi, a "reference point of studies and strategy for MSI's economical policy" – where Giudici refers to Robert Michels' analysis on Mussolini's syncretism.

In this last book, Giudici blames the fascist antisemitism. The Italian historian Gianni Rossi notes Giudici, though he does not deny or minimize the Mussolinian antisemitism, finds it "reluctant".

== Awards ==
- Commander of the Order of Merit of the Italian Republic.
- Primevère d'argent de l'Académie des Sciences, Belles-Lettres et Arts de Lyon.
