= Jean Canappe =

French physician

Jean Canappe (sometimes written Jean Canape) (1495- after 1558) was a French physician who was attached to Francis I of France in 1542. He sometimes wrote under the pseudonym Philiatros and was known because he contributed to the transmission of medical and surgical knowledge in French with Pierre Tolet.

== Biography ==
Jean Canappe was born in 1495. He was principal at the Collège de la Trinité in Lyon from 1528 to 1530 and obtained his medical degree at the University of Montpellier in 1530 in one of the two classes which constituted the "cercle des anticques amys" of Rabelais": Nostradamus, Pierre Tolet, Jacobus Sylvius and Guillaume Rondelet for 1529 and Jean Canappe, Charles des Marais and Antoine Champier for 1530. He worked with Symphorien Champier at the College of Medicine in Lyon and became a friend of Ambroise Paré for whom he translated several books by Galen. Public reader of the surgeons-barbers in Lyon in 1538 he was the "abbreviator" of Guy de Chauliac himself considered as the father of medical surgery, a profession then reserved to barbers.

== Works ==
Canappe undertook to give lessons in surgery in French and to translate into French anatomical and medical books in Latin and Greek because surgery was not taught in French at that time. In this way he provided written and oral instructions to the barbers of his time, who also practised surgery. These men, who had not received a brilliant education, could not draw surgical knowledge from works written in Latin and there were few surgical books in French at the time. Latin remained the language of knowledge, but translations of the great ancient authors (Galen, Hippocrates) then appeared to accompany the development of medical knowledge and the publication of works. Against some doctors who thought that the translation of ancient Latin works into French would distort medicine, these humanist doctors argued that translation into the vernacular would, on the contrary, allow new progress in health and public health: barber-surgeons could add to their manual skills, an ancient surgical knowledge confronted with their actual practice.

"If you want a servant to follow your orders, you can't give them in an unknown tongue."

— Pierre Tolet

Canape increased the number of translated books and thus helped to train surgeons. Ambroise Paré was one of them.

"Je ne veulx m'arroger que j'aye leu Galien parlant grec, ou latin. Car na pleu à Dieu tant de faire de grâce en ma ieunesse qu'elle aye esté de l'une et l'autre langue instituée. Mais aussi ne vouldroys aucunement dissimuler que i'ai apris lesdictz documents de Galien par l'interprétation Française de Monsieur Maître Jean Canape docteur régent en la Faculté de Médecine faisant la demeurance à Lyon."
“I do not want to claim that I have read Galen speaking Greek or Latin. For it has not pleased God so much to make Grace in my youth that it has been in either language instituted. But also I would not want to conceal in any way that I learned the said documents of Galen by Mr. Master Jean Canape, Regent Doctor in the Faculty of Medicine, living in Lyon."

— Ambroise Paré

Canappe translated several of Galen's books from Greek into French, such as:

- Le livre des Simples (The Book of the Plants) (1545)
- L'anatomie du corps humain (The Anatomy of the Human Body (1541–1583)
- Le livre de Galien traitant du mouvement et des muscles (Galen's book on movement and muscles) (1545)

as well as Latin medical books in French:

- Loys Vasse; Jean Canappe (1558). L'anatomie du corps humain, réduite en tables. Jehan Ruelle.;
- Loys Vasse; Jean Canappe (1547). Tables anatomiques du corps humain universel: soit de l'homme, ou de la femme. J. de Tournes.;
- Commentaires et annotations sur le prologue et chapitre singulier de Guy de Chauliac (1542).

He also wrote:

- Guy de Chauliac; Jean Canappe (1562). Le guidon en francoys, pour les barbiers et chirurgiens. Jean Ruelle..

Jean Canappe's disciple was Pierre Tolet who was also linked with Rabelais.

In January 1539, Étienne Dolet wrote him the following letter:

"Estienne Dolet à Maistre Jehan Canappe, Docteur en Médecine, Salut.

Sache Amy, que l'utilité que j'ay congneu proceder des Livres de Galien. C'est assavoir le III, IIII, V, VI, XIII et XIIII, de la Methode Therapeutique, avec le Second de l'Art Curatoire a Glaucon lesquels m'as baillé, sur foy de les mettre fidelement en lumiere, m'a induit (avec l'amytié que je te porte) d'y vacquer en la sorte, que telz Œuvres requierent. Et soulz le Privileige, que le Roy m'a donné, maintenant sortent en lumière. Prendz donc en gré mon labeur : et ne te lasse en ton endroict, de proffiter au bien public Literaire."

De Lyon ce XXV de janvier 1539."
