= Louise Labé =

French poet (died 1566)

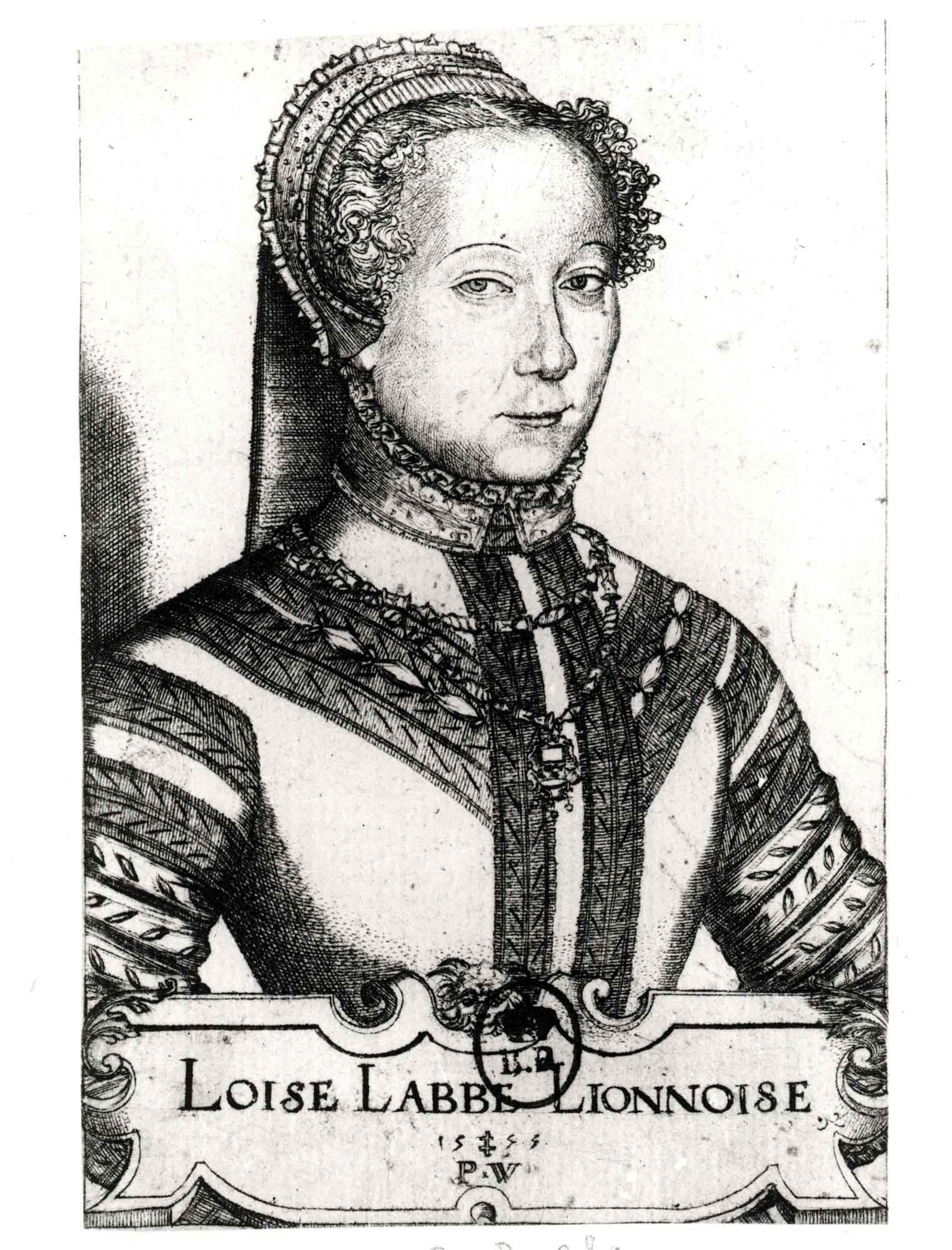
- Louise Labé; engraving by Pierre Woeiriot, 1555
- Born: Louise Charlin Perrin Labé c. 1522; Lyon, Lyonnais, Kingdom of France
- Died: 25 April 1566 (aged 43–44); Parcieux-en-Dombes, Lyonnais, Kingdom of France
- Writing career
- Language: French

Louise Charlin Perrin Labé (c. 1522 – 25 April 1566), also identified as La Belle Cordière ("The Fair Ropemaker") after her father's job, was a French Renaissance poet from Lyon.

== Biography ==
Louise Labé was born in Lyon, into a family of ropemakers, surgeons, and butchers. Her father, Pierre Charly, was a successful ropemaker, who started a business on rue de l'Arbre sec, at the base of Saint Sébastien Hill in Lyon. When his first wife died in 1515, he married Etiennette Roybet, and had five children: Barthélemy, Francois, Mathieu, Claudine, and Louise. It is presumed that Louise Labé was born at some point between her father's wedding in 1516 and her mother's death in 1523.

Records show that Labé's father, despite his humble beginnings, eventually achieved some social prestige. For example, in 1534, he was summoned before the Assemblée de Consuls of the city of Lyon to approve and participate in the founding of a relief agency for the poor.

At some point, perhaps in a convent school, Labé received an education in foreign languages (Greek, Latin, Italian, and Spanish) and music, specifically the lute.

As a young woman, she was acclaimed as an extraordinary horsewoman and archer. Her early biographers called her "la belle Amazone" and report that she dressed in male clothing and fought as a knight on horseback in the ranks of the Dauphin (afterwards Henry II) at the siege of Perpignan. She was also said to have participated in tournament jousts performed in Lyon in honor of Henry II's visit.

Between 1543 and 1545 she married Ennemond Perrin, also a Lyon ropemaker, a marriage dictated in her father's will, and which established the succession of the rope manufacturing business he was involved in. The business must have been prosperous, since the couple purchased a townhouse with a large garden in 1551, and, in 1557, a country estate at Parcieux-en-Dombes near Lyon.

Lyon was the cultural centre of France in the first half of the sixteenth century and Labé hosted a literary salon that included many of the renowned Lyonnais poets and humanists, including Maurice Scève, Clement Marot, Claude de Taillemont, Pontus de Tyard, and Pernette du Guillet.

The poet Olivier de Magny, passing through Lyon on his way to Rome, fell in love with Labé, and is the likely subject of her love sonnets. Magny's Odes contained a poem (A Sire Aymon) that mocked and belittled Labé's husband (who had died by 1557).

Perhaps inspired by the posthumous publication of Pernette du Guillet's collection of love poems in 1545, Labé began writing her own poetry. On March 13, 1555, Labé received from Henry II a privilège protecting her exclusive right to publish her works for a period of 5 years. Her Œuvres were printed in 1555, by the renowned Lyonnais printer Jean de Tournes. In addition to her own writings, the volume contained twenty-four poems in her honour, authored by her male contemporaries and entitled Escriz de divers poetes, a la louenge de Louize Labe Lionnoize ("Writings of diverse poets, in praise of Louise Labé of Lyons"). The authors of these praise poems (not all of whom can be reliably identified) include Maurice Scève, Pontus de Tyard, Claude de Taillemont, Clément Marot, Olivier de Magny, Jean-Antoine de Baïf, Mellin de Saint-Gelais, Antoine du Moulin, and Antoine Fumee. Her contemporaries compare her to Sappho and hail Labé as the Tenth Muse.

Debate on whether Labé was or was not a courtesan began in the sixteenth century, and has continued up to the present day. In 1557 a popular song on the scandalous behavior of La Cordière was published in Lyon. In 1560 Jean Calvin referred to her cross-dressing and called her a plebeia meretrix or common whore. Scholars deliberate carefully over what status to accord to such statements published in a piece of religious propaganda by a writer whose tone has been described as vicious and hysterical, and similarly question to what extent the historian Paradin, writing in 1573, was aiming at neutral objectivity in writing "She had a face more angelic than human, which was yet nothing in comparison with her spirit which was so chaste, so virtuous, so poetic and of such uncommon knowledge that it would seem to have been created by God so that we may wonder at it as something prodigious." Debates on whether or not she was a courtesan and other aspects of her life have not always been of interest to critics who have focussed increasing attention on her writings, especially her verse.

In 1564, the plague broke out in Lyon, taking the lives of some of Labé's friends. In 1565, suffering herself from bad health, she retired to the home of her companion Thomas Fortin, a banker from Florence, who witnessed her will (a document that is extant). She died there in 1566, and was buried on her country property close to Parcieux-en-Dombes, outside Lyon.

== Works and reception ==
Her Œuvres include two prose works: a feminist preface, urging women to write, that is dedicated to a young noblewoman of Lyon, Clémence de Bourges; and a dramatic allegory in prose entitled Débat de Folie et d'Amour (translated into English by Robert Greene in 1608), which belongs to a long tradition with examples from antiquity through to the Middle Ages, a tradition that had gained contemporary prominence due to the controversial satire, Erasmus' Praise of Folly. The Débat, the most admired of her works in the sixteenth century, was used as the source for one of the fables of Jean de la Fontaine, and was translated into English by Robert Greene in 1584.

Her poetry consists of three elegies in the style of the Heroides of Ovid, and twenty-four sonnets that draw on the traditions of Neoplatonism and Petrarchism. The great theme of her sonnets are the longings, torments and satisfactions of a passionate love which, however noble, is very much of this world, with no metaphysical concepts evoked and no references to a more perfect world than this one. A critic such as Breghot du Lut, writing for the 1824 edition of her works, found that he must apologize to the reader for her explicitness of some of her works; Sainte-Beuve, in 1845, expressed something that was to become a refrain for readers and critics up to this day: despite her work showing that she was highly learned, this does not prevent her from seeming to speak to contemporary readers in a very direct way.

Her poetry was singled out among that of her contemporaries for special praise by Rilke, with Ferdinand Brunetière, in his 1900 article on the Pléiade and Lyonnese schools, writing that her poetry was the first time in French that passion was expressed with such vehemence and naiveté. Modern critics cite her rejection of the more showy or extravagant metaphors and poetic effects employed by poets such as Scève or Pernette du Guillet as one of the key components of her originality and appeal for the modern reader, with Jerry C. Nash writing in 1980

"Labé's lyrical voice is truly one of the best expressions in literature of artful simplicity, of a consistent and masterly synthesis of substance and form, of passion and poetry".

Readers have, from the middle of the last century, commented on how in her verse she presents women in a way that goes against prevailing attitudes about what a woman's nature was or what made a woman either praiseworthy or blameworthy, a feature which makes her appear more in step with modern ideas than her contemporaries were. The frank expression of female desire had previously been confined to comic genres such as fabliaux.

In 2005, Labé's work was included on the programme of a very prestigious exam in France, sparking a flurry of academic publications. The most remarked upon of these was the 2006 book Louise Labé: une créature de papier (Droz); discussed below.

The sonnets have been her most famous works following the early modern period, and were translated into German by Rainer Maria Rilke and into Dutch by Pieter Cornelis Boutens. They have been translated into English, maintaining the exact rhyme patterns of the originals, by poet Annie Finch (published in the same volume with a translation of Labé's prose by Deborah Lesko Baker, University of Chicago Press, 2006), and by Richard Siebuth in a volume published by NYRB (2014).

=== Marc Fumaroli and Mireille Huchon ===
In her 2006 book the Sorbonne professor and specialist of Rabelais Mireille Huchon controversially argued that, despite over four centuries of scholarship and biographical evidence to the contrary, Louise Labé was not the author of the works signed with her name but rather that these works were by the Lyonnais poets Maurice Scève, Olivier de Magny, Claude de Taillemont, Jacques Peletier du Mans, Guillaume des Autels, and others, and by the publisher Jean de Tournes. The conservative critic Marc Fumaroli called Huchon's argument "irrefutable" in the literature supplement of Le Monde. Numerous critics and scholars examined Huchon's essay and frequently found her reasoning absurd, judging that her interpretation of the biographical evidence seemed to show inexplicable bias and reliance on unfounded assumptions. The lack of any evidence in support of her thesis was a further reason for the ease with which many dismissed her ideas as mistaken and considered Huchon's work to have made no valuable contribution to scholarship. The list of eminent scholars opposing Huchon include Emmanuel Buron, Henri Hours, Bernard Plessy, Madeleine Lazard, Daniel Martin, Eliane Viennot, and many others. Despite strong objections from most Labé scholars, however, Huchon's audacious thesis has not entirely disappeared from view.

== Works in English ==
- Complete poetry and prose : a bilingual edition, Chicago, Ill.; London: University of Chicago Press, 2006. ISBN 978-0-226-46715-3, OCLC 877377277
- Louise Labé's complete works, Troy, N.Y.: Whitston Pub. Co., 1986. ISBN 978-0-87875-319-2, OCLC 13343858
- Debate of folly and love, New York: P. Lang, 2000. ISBN 978-0-8204-3752-1, OCLC 36138408
- Love sonnets, New York: New Directions, 1947. OCLC 716753009
- Love sonnets & elegies, New York: New York Review Books, 2014. ISBN 978-1-59017-731-0, OCLC 852457621

== See also ==
- Pernette Du Guillet
- Enzo Giudici

== Bibliography ==
- Hennigfeld, Ursula. Der ruinierte Körper. Petrarkistische Sonette in transkultureller Perspektive. Würzburg: Königshausen & Neumann, 2008. ISBN 978-3-8260-3768-9
- Cameron, Keith. "Louise Labé: Renaissance poet and feminist". New York: Berg, 1990. ISBN 0-85496-618-8
