= Middle French =

Historical variety of French

- françois, franceis
- Region: France
- Era: Evolved into Modern French by the early 17th century
- Language family: Indo-European: Italic; Latino-Faliscan; Latinic; Romance; Italo-Western; Western; Gallo-Iberian; Gallo-Romance; Gallo-Rhaetian?; Arpitan–Oïl; Oïl; Francien zone; Middle French
- Early forms: Old Latin: Vulgar Latin; Proto-Romance; Old Gallo-Romance; Old French

Language codes
- ISO 639-2: frm
- ISO 639-3: frm
- Glottolog: midd1316

Middle French (French: moyen français) is a historical division of the French language that covers the period from the mid-14th to the early 17th centuries. It is a period of transition during which:

- French became clearly distinguished from the other competing Oïl languages, which are sometimes subsumed within the concept of Old French (l'ancien français)
- French was imposed as the official language of the Kingdom of France in place of Latin and other Oïl and Occitan languages
- the literary development of French prepared the vocabulary and grammar for the Classical French (le français classique) spoken in the 17th and 18th centuries.

It is the first version of French that is largely intelligible to Modern French, contrary to Old French.

== History ==
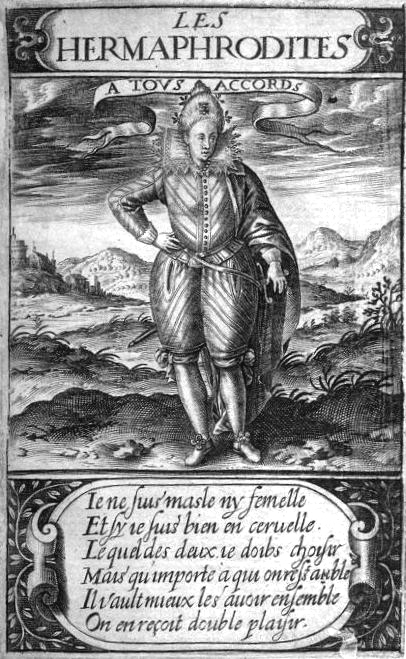
Thomas Artus's Les Hermaphrodites, 1605. The spelling of words ie, masle, ny, sy, ceruelle, doibs, vault, ressamble, auoir is typical of Renaissance French, compared to their modern counterparts je, mâle, ni, si, cervelle, dois, vaut, ressemble, avoir.

The most important change found in Middle French is the complete disappearance of the noun declension system, which had been underway for centuries. There was no longer a distinction between nominative and oblique forms of nouns, and plurals became indicated by simply an s. The transformations necessitated an increased reliance on word order in the sentence, which becomes more or less the syntax of Modern but with a continued reliance on the verb in the second position of a sentence, or "verb-second structure", until the 16th century.

Among the elites, Latin was still the language of education, administration, and bureaucracy. That changed in 1539, with the Ordinance of Villers-Cotterêts, in which Francis I made French the sole language for legal acts. Regional differences were still extreme throughout the Kingdom of France: in the south of France, Occitan languages dominated; in east-central France, Franco-Provençal languages were predominant; and in the north of France, Oïl languages other than Francien continued to be spoken.

The fascination with classical texts led to numerous borrowings from Latin and Greek. Numerous neologisms based on Latin roots were introduced, and some scholars modified the spelling of French words to bring them into conformity with their Latin roots, sometimes erroneously. That often produced a radical difference between a word's spelling and pronunciation. Nevertheless, Middle French spelling was overall fairly close to the pronunciation; unlike Modern French, word-final consonants were still pronounced though they were optionally lost when they preceded another consonant that started the next word.

Between the 1490s and the 1550s, the French wars in Italy and the presence of Italians in the French court brought the French into contact with Italian humanism. Many words dealing with the military (alarme, cavalier, espion, infanterie, camp, canon, soldat) and artistic (especially architectural: arcade, architrave, balcon, corridor; also literary: sonnet) practices were borrowed from Italian. Those tendencies would continue through Classical French.

There were also some borrowings from Spanish (casque) and German (reître) and from the Americas (cacao, hamac, maïs).

The influence of the Anglo-Norman language on English had left words of French and Norman origin in England. Some words of Romance origin now found their way back into French as doublets through war and trade.

Also, the meaning and usage of many words from Old French transformed.

Spelling and punctuation were extremely variable. The introduction of printing in 1470 highlighted the need for reform in spelling. One proposed reform came from Jacques Peletier du Mans, who developed a phonetic spelling system and introduced new typographic signs (1550), but his attempt at spelling reform was not followed.

The period saw the publication of the first French grammars and of the French-Latin dictionary of Robert Estienne (1539).

At the beginning of the 17th century, French would see the continued unification of French, the suppression of certain forms, and the prescription of rules, leading to Classical French.

== Phonological history ==
| Latin | Proto-Romance | Old French | | Middle French | Modern French | |
| Latin | Proto-Romance | 9th century | 12th century | 15th century | 18th century | 21st century |
|---|---|---|---|---|---|---|
| PEDEM 'foot' | */ˈpɛde/ | /pjeð/ | /pjeθ/ pied | /pje/ | /pje/ | /pje/ pied |
| MĀTŪRUM 'mature' | */maˈturu/ | /maˈðyr/ | /məˈyr/ meür | /my(r)/ | /myr/ | /myʁ/ mûr |
| SCŪTUM 'shield' | */(ɪ)sˈkutu/ | /esˈkyð/ | /esˈky/ escu | /eˈky/ | /eˈky/ | /eˈky/ écu |
| SAETAM 'silk' | */ˈseta/ | /ˈsejðə/ | /ˈsej.ə/ seie | /ˈsoj.ə/ | /ˈswɛ.ə/ | /swa/ soie |
| FĒMINAM 'woman' | */ˈfemɪna/ | /ˈfemnə/ | /ˈfemːə/ femme | /ˈfãmə/ | /ˈfam(ə)/ | /fam/ femme |
| HOMINEM 'man' | */ˈɔmɪne/ | /ˈɔmnə/ | /ˈɔmːə/ homme | /ˈɔ̃mə/ | /ˈɔm(ə)/ | /ɔm/ homme |
| BELLUS 'beautiful' | */ˈbɛlːʊs/ | /bɛɫs/ | /be̯aws/ beaus | /be̯o/ | /bjo/ | /bo/ beau |
| HABĒRE 'to have' | */aˈβere/ | /aˈvejr/ | /aˈvɔjr/ avoir | /aˈvwɛ(r)/ | /aˈvwɛr/ | /aˈvwaʁ/ avoir |
| IŪDICĀTUM 'judged' | */judɪˈkatu/ | /dʒyˈdʒjeð/ | /ʒyˈʒje/ jugié | /ʒyˈʒe/ | /ʒyˈʒe/ | /ʒyˈʒe/ jugé |
| COLLŌCĀRE 'to place' | */kolːoˈkare/ | /koɫˈtʃjer/ | /kuˈtʃjer/ couchier | /kuˈʃje(r)/ | /kuˈʃe/ | /kuˈʃe/ coucher |

== Literature ==
Middle French is the language found in the writings of Charles, Duke of Orléans, François Villon, Clément Marot, François Rabelais, Michel de Montaigne, Pierre de Ronsard, and the poets of La Pléiade.

The affirmation and glorification of French finds its greatest manifestation in La Défense et illustration de la langue française (The Defense and Illustration of the French Language) (1549) by the poet Joachim du Bellay, which maintained that French, like the Tuscan of Petrarch and Dante Alighieri, was a worthy language for literary expression and promulgated a program of linguistic production and purification, including the imitation of Latin genres.
