= Couture-sur-Loir =

- Part of Vallée-de-Ronsard
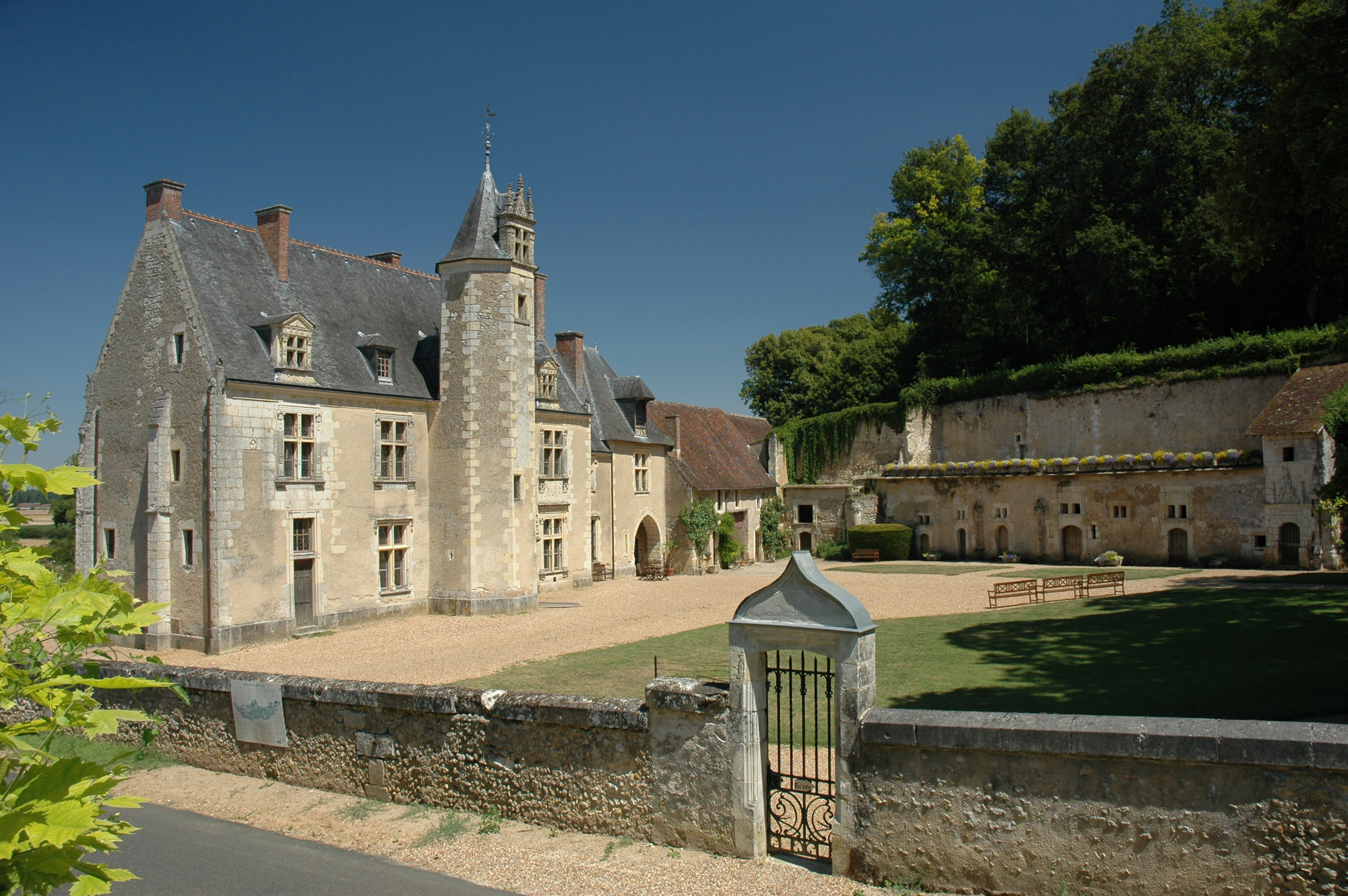
- Manoir de la Possonnière, birthplace of Pierre de Ronsard

- Coat of arms
- Location of Couture-sur-Loir
- Location within France Location within Centre-Val de Loire
- Coordinates: 47°45′16″N 0°41′19″E
- Country: France
- Region: Centre-Val de Loire
- Department: Loir-et-Cher
- Arrondissement: Vendôme
- Canton: Montoire-sur-le-Loir
- Commune: Vallée-de-Ronsard
- Area^{1}: 14.3 km^{2} (5.5 sq mi)
- Elevation: 70 m (230 ft)
- Highest elevation: 136 m (446 ft)
- Lowest elevation: 54 m (177 ft)
- Population (2023): 435
  - Density: 30.4/km^{2} (78.8/sq mi)
- Time zone: UTC+01:00 (CET)
  - Summer (DST): UTC+02:00 (CEST)
- Postal code: 41800
- ^{1} French Land Register data, which excludes lakes, ponds, glaciers > 1 km^{2} (0.386 sq mi or 247 acres) and river estuaries.

Couture-sur-Loir (French pronunciation: [kutyʁ syʁ lwaʁ], literally Couture on Loir) is a former commune in the Loir-et-Cher department of central France. On 1 January 2019, it was merged into the new commune Vallée-de-Ronsard.

It is situated in the northwest of the Loir-et-Cher department, 33 km (21 mi) to the west of Vendôme. It lies mainly on the left bank of the river Loir.

== Geography ==
Couture is in the canton of Montoire-sur-le-Loir, which corresponds to the historic Bas-Vendômois district.

Adjacent to the village centre (with a crossroad street pattern) or bourg are two parallel settlements, Le Poirier and more distinctly Le Pin.

== Economy ==
The main industry (apart from farming and tourism) is gravel extraction; excavated areas have been adapted for water sports. A number of inhabitants are employed by the paper manufacturers at Bessé-sur-Braye (Sarthe).

== History ==
It is first referred to as Villas culturas in a charter of the 9th-century bishop of Le Mans, Saint Aldric (earlier references are doubtless fictitious).

A partial source for the history of Couture in the later 17th century are the memoirs of Louis XIV's valet, Marie Dubois, who came from the village.

== Sights ==
The housing reflects periods of prosperity and villégiature-type occupation in recent centuries.

Renowned for the Renaissance chateau of La Possonnière, birthplace of the poet Pierre de Ronsard, the village also possesses an Angevin-style church dedicated to Saints Gervase and Protase. The church contains the tombstone of Ronsard's parents and is known for its spire.

== Personalities ==
Notable 20th-century inhabitants have included the Hallopeau and Sainte-Claire Deville families (noted scientists), the academic inspector Jean Pasquier and the Catholic historian François Lebrun. It is also the town where Pierre de Ronsard (1524-1585) was born.

== See also ==
- Braye (river)
- Communes of the Loir-et-Cher department
