= Vallée-de-Ronsard =

- Commune
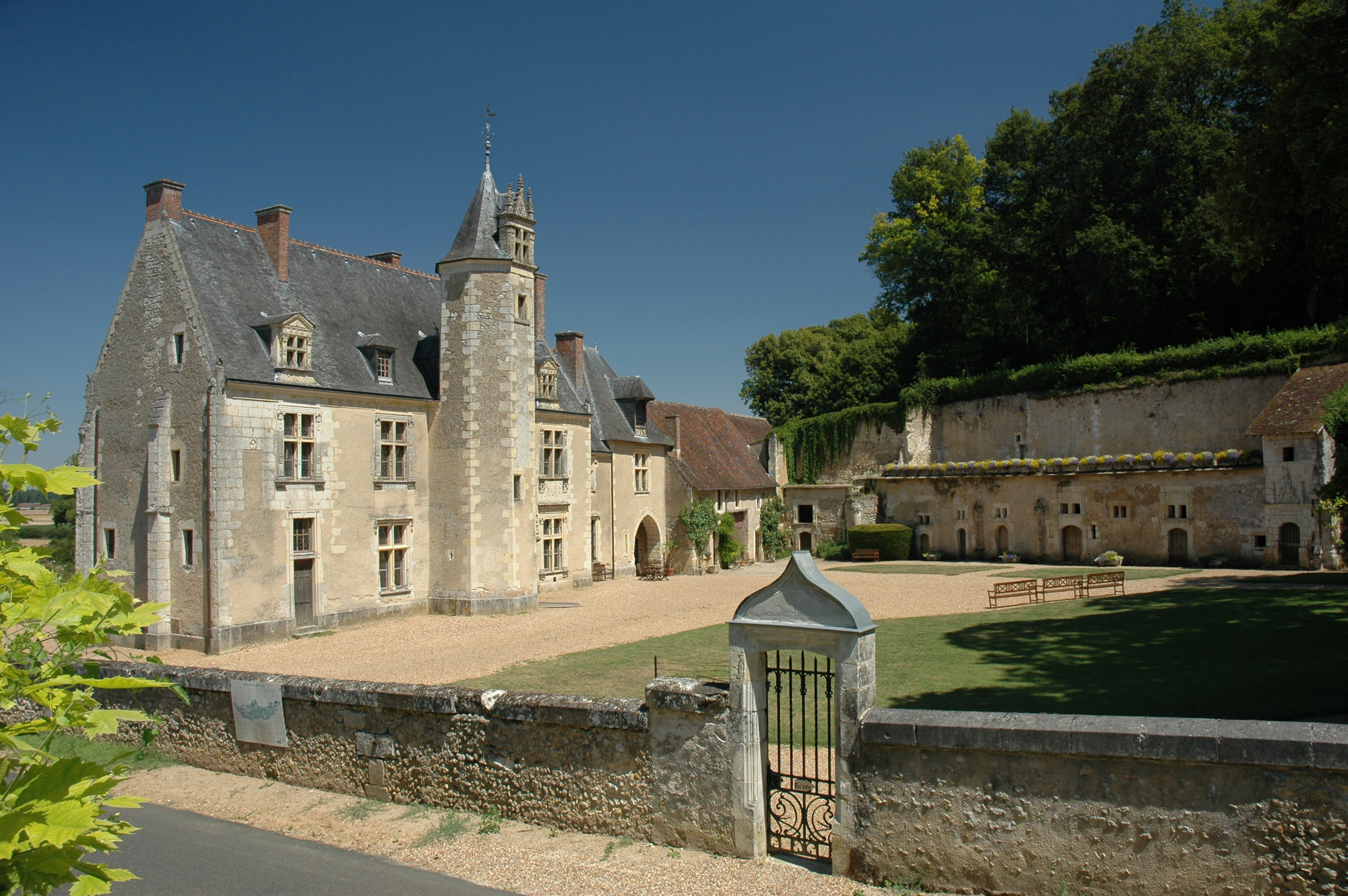
- Manoir de la Possonnière, birthplace of Pierre de Ronsard
- Location of Vallée-de-Ronsard
- Location within France Location within Centre-Val de Loire
- Coordinates: 47°45′16″N 0°41′19″E
- Country: France
- Region: Centre-Val de Loire
- Department: Loir-et-Cher
- Arrondissement: Vendôme
- Canton: Montoire-sur-le-Loir
- Intercommunality: CA Territoires Vendômois

Government
  - Mayor (2020–2026): Philippe Mercier
- Area^{1}: 19.95 km^{2} (7.70 sq mi)
- Highest elevation: 136 m (446 ft)
- Lowest elevation: 53 m (174 ft)
- Population (2023): 531
  - Density: 26.6/km^{2} (68.9/sq mi)
- Time zone: UTC+01:00 (CET)
  - Summer (DST): UTC+02:00 (CEST)
- INSEE/Postal code: 41070 /41800
- ^{1} French Land Register data, which excludes lakes, ponds, glaciers > 1 km^{2} (0.386 sq mi or 247 acres) and river estuaries.

Vallée-de-Ronsard (French pronunciation: [vale də ʁɔ̃saʁ], literally Valley of Ronsard) is a commune in the Loir-et-Cher department of central France. It was established on 1 January 2019 by merger of the former communes of Couture-sur-Loir (the seat) and Tréhet.

== See also ==
- Communes of the Loir-et-Cher department
