= Rosa 'Eden' =

Rose cultivar

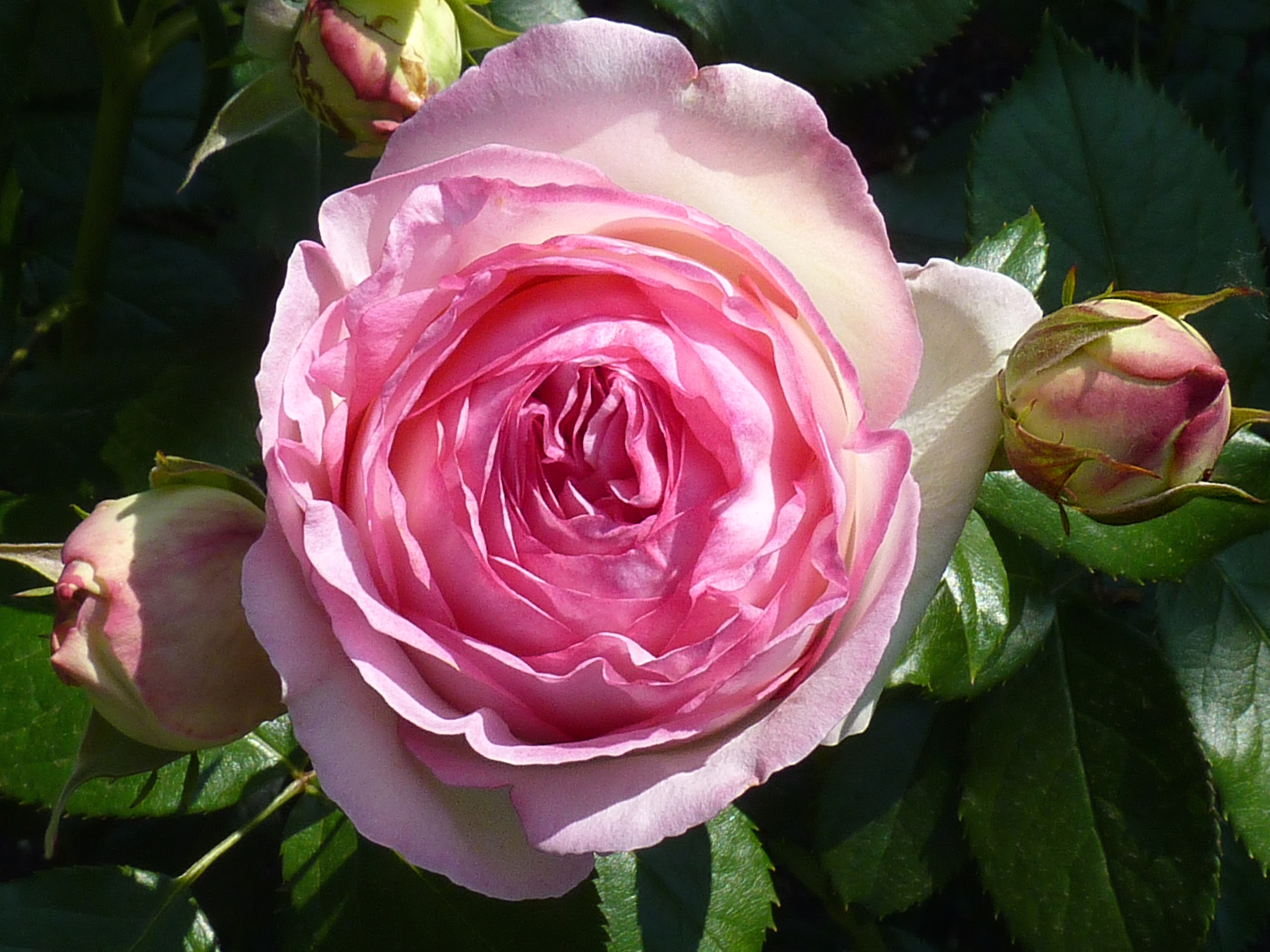
- Hybrid parentage: ['Danse des Sylphes' × 'Handel'] × 'Pink Wonder'
- Cultivar group: Climber
- Cultivar: Rosa 'Eden'
- Marketing names: 'Pierre de Ronsard', 'MEIviolin', 'Eden Rose 85', 'Eden Rose '88', 'Eden Climber'
- Origin: Marie-Louise Meilland, France, 1985

Rosa 'Eden' (also known as 'Pierre de Ronsard', 'MEIviolin', and 'Eden Rose 85') is a light pink and white climbing rose. The cultivar was created by Marie-Louise Meilland and introduced in France by Meilland International in 1985 as part of the Renaissance® Collection. It was named 'Pierre de Ronsard', after the French Renaissance poet Pierre de Ronsard in reference to his famous ode that begins: Mignonne, allons voir si la rose for the 400th death anniversary celebrations of the poet. The cultivar is also called 'Eden Rose 85' as Meilland had already introduced a rose cultivar called 'Eden' in the 1950s.

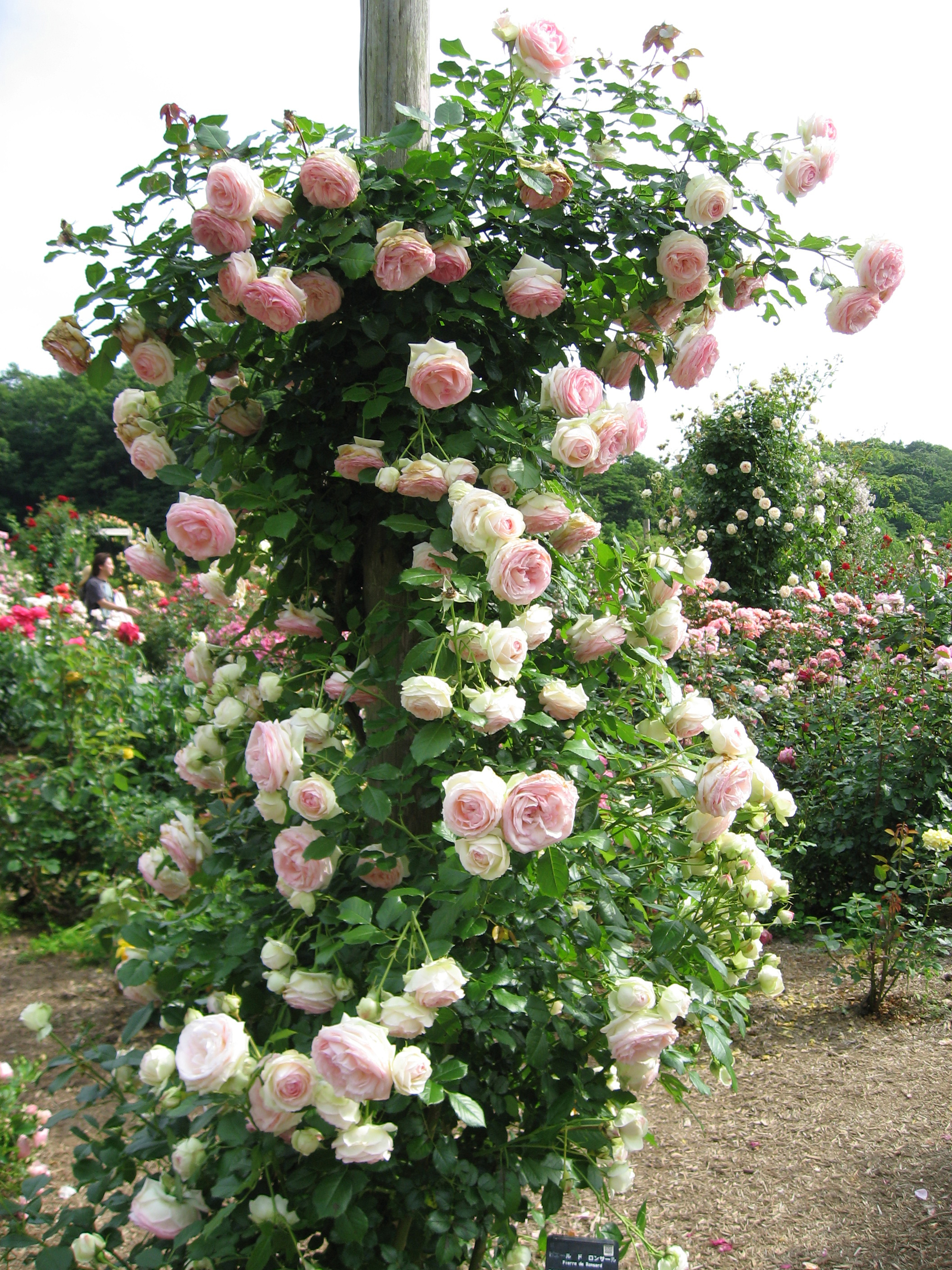
'Eden' trained as climber

The large, old-rose type blooms are carmine-pink on the inside and cream or ivory on the outside, reaching an average diameter of 3" (10 cm). The large flowers are very full with 55 to 60 petals. Due to their weight the cupped, globular flowers bow their heads. They have a very light to moderate tart fragrance, appear mostly solitary, open slowly and normally not fully. 'Pierre de Ronsard' blooms more or less continuously throughout the season, but strongest during the first flush.

The tall shrub rose or a small climber grows upright and bushy, reaching 100 to 365 cm (39" to 12') height and about 1.8 metres (5.9 ft) width. It has very sturdy, dense, dark green foliage with large, semi-glossy leaves, and almost no prickles. It is winter hardy (USDA zone 5b through 9b), heat and rain tolerant, and very disease resistant, but needs a good nutrient supply and enough sun. In half shade the cultivar is less floriferous. It can be grown as solitary shrub or in groups, in containers or as standard rose to 90 cm (3 ft) high, and is very well suited for cut flowers. Due to its bowing flower heads, training the rose as a small climber along a fence or other supports is recommended.

The cultivar was not very popular when introduced in 1985, but has since become a well-known nostalgic rose. In 2006, 'Pierre de Ronsard' was named 'World's Favourite Rose' and inducted into the Rose Hall of Fame.
