= Loir (disambiguation) =

The Loir is a river in France.

Loir may also refer to:

- Loir en Vallée, a commune in northwestern France
- Adrien Loir (1862–1941), French bacteriologist
- Caroline Loir (born 1988), French canoeist

== Artists ==
- Luigi Loir (1845–1916), French painter, illustrator and lithographer, known for ceiling paintings and landscapes
- Marianne Loir (c.1715–1769), French portrait painter
- Nicolas-Pierre Loir (1624–1679), French painter and engraver of religious and historical allegories
