= Tréhet =

- Part of Vallée-de-Ronsard
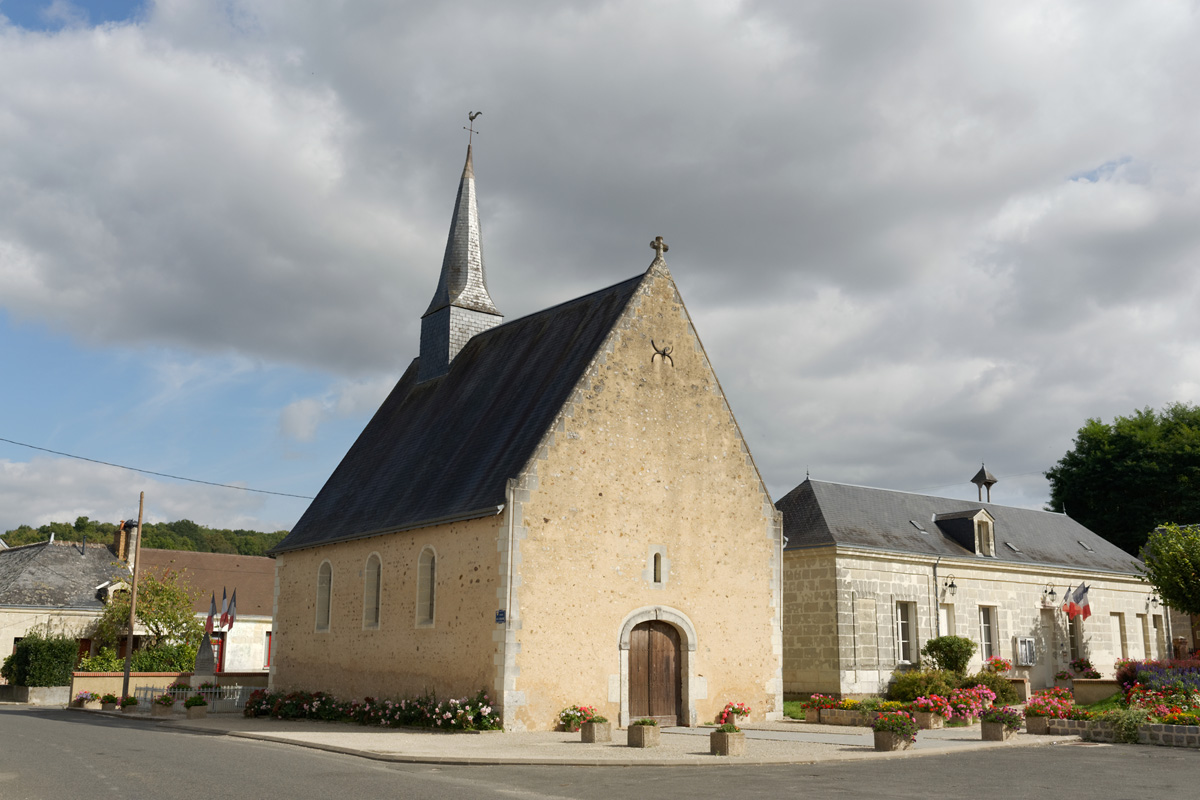

- Coat of arms
- Location of Tréhet
- Location within France Location within Centre-Val de Loire
- Coordinates: 47°44′06″N 0°37′21″E
- Country: France
- Region: Centre-Val de Loire
- Department: Loir-et-Cher
- Arrondissement: Vendôme
- Canton: Montoire-sur-le-Loir
- Commune: Vallée-de-Ronsard
- Area^{1}: 5.65 km^{2} (2.18 sq mi)
- Elevation: 58 m (190 ft)
- Highest elevation: 110 m (360 ft)
- Lowest elevation: 53 m (174 ft)
- Population (2023): 96
  - Density: 17/km^{2} (44/sq mi)
- Time zone: UTC+01:00 (CET)
  - Summer (DST): UTC+02:00 (CEST)
- Postal code: 41800
- ^{1} French Land Register data, which excludes lakes, ponds, glaciers > 1 km^{2} (0.386 sq mi or 247 acres) and river estuaries.

Tréhet (French pronunciation: [tʁe.ɛ]) is a former commune of the Loir-et-Cher department in central France. On 1 January 2019, it was merged into the new commune Vallée-de-Ronsard.

== Geography ==
The commune is situated on the left bank of the Loir close to the Sarthe department communes of La Chartre-sur-le-Loir and Ruillé-sur-Loir and is traversed by the Niclos stream.

== Etymology ==
The name derives from Latin trajectus (crossing).

== Sights ==
Its small partly Romanesque church, dedicated to Mary, has recently been restored, revealing early wall paintings (the subject is the martyrdom of St. Lawrence).

== See also ==
- Communes of the Loir-et-Cher department
