= Solange Alexandre =

French resistance fighter (1922–2026)

- Born: Solange Rose Marguerite Dubuisson; 9 September 1922; Mamers, Sarthe, France
- Died: 8 November 2026 (aged 104); Le Mans, Sarthe, France
- Other name: Corlay (wartime pseudonym)
- Education: Normal school
- Occupations: French Resistance fighter; Teacher
- Years active: 1941–1945
- Era: World War II
- Organization: French Forces of the Interior

Solange Rose Marguerite Alexandre (née Dubuisson, first married name Deliot; 9 September 1922 – 8 November 2026) was a French schoolteacher and a member of the French Resistance during World War II. She was the leader of the resistance group Pas-de-bœuf ("Ox's Passage") in Ruillé-sur-Loir and commanded more than thirty men who helped to liberate Touraine from the Nazi German occupation.

== Biography ==
=== Family and youth ===
Solange Rose Marguerite Dubuisson was born in Mamers on 9 September 1922. Her father was the gendarme Albert Dubuisson, who was posted to the Mamers gendarmerie school. He quit the Gendarmerie after fifteen years and found a job in the Sarthe prefecture. In World War I, her mother lost her first husband and her father was wounded. Dubuisson was raised in a fervently patriotic household.

Dubuisson was a gymnastics champion in the Maine-Anjou-Touraine region. When World War II broke out, Dubuisson was a student at the Le Mans "Ecole Normale Primaire" (normal school training students to become teachers) where she was still a student in 1940.

=== In the Resistance ===
Dubuisson was inspired to join the anti-German resistance in 1940 after hearing Charles de Gaulle's Appeal of 18 June. She was seventeen years old. In 1941, she met Lieutenant Saïd Belhaffaf, who had retired from the French Army. Of Tunisian origin, he had been one of her father's friends and was an early member of the Resistance. Thanks to him, she became involved in the Resistance within the Organisation civile et militaire (OCM) as a liaison officer in Maine, Brittany, and Normandy. She took the name "Corlay". She quickly took advantage of her travels and her knowledge of the region to gather intelligence.

In 1943, she met the man who would later become her first husband, Guy Deliot. To avoid the Service du travail obligatoire (STO), he became involved in the Gendarmerie nationale, in which he was assigned to the Le Mans brigade. While serving alongside some Gestapo officers, he refused to arrest a Jewish couple, and then he chose to desert, with one of his fellow gendarmes, and joined the Resistance.

On 5 April 1944, with her friends Michel and Jean Gadois, as well as Guy Deliot, Dubuisson established a Resistance cell at Étang du Pas-de-bœuf ("Ox's Passage Pond") near Ruillé-sur-Loir. It was made up mainly of those who resisted STO service, but there were some survivors from the Mortagne cell, which had been decimated by the Gestapo. She became the cell's leader, commanding more than thirty men.

The Pas-de-bœuf cell fought the Germans, organized acts of sabotage, sheltered Allied flyers, and took part in liberating Tours and its surrounding region alongside the reconstituted IV/4 battalion of the French 65th Infantry Regiment.

On 8 August 1944, the cell returned from a sabotage operation against a munitions train on the Tours–Le Mans line. They learnt that a group of Germans were stationed at a farm in la Durtière in Ruillé-sur-Loir. Counting on the element of surprise, while also underestimating the enemy's numbers, the cell's fifteen or so members attacked them. They had not noticed a guard who was posted nearby, who shot back at them. The cell had to retreat, and as they did so, Michel Gadois was wounded by the German guard, sustaining a gunshot wound to the head.

Once the region's liberation operations were over, Dubuisson was named the departmental head of the French Forces of the Interior (FFI) social service, and welcomed deportees and freed prisoners.

She came out of the war with the rank of FFI sub-lieutenant.

On 7 April 1945 in Le Mans, she wed her friend, the gendarme Guy Deliot, with whom she would have three children (Jean-Pierre, Marie-France, and Françoise).

=== After the war ===
In 1951, Deliot followed her husband, who had been transferred, to New Caledonia. As there was no work for her there in teaching, she became Secretary General of Nouméa's Chamber of Agriculture. Her husband had to change assignments frequently, and the family moved a total of 17 times.

In 1960, her husband died whilst on official duty in Martinique, which was undergoing a period of civil unrest at the time. She then returned to Le Mans with her three children, where she once again took up her profession as a teacher, continuing until her retirement in 1978.

In 1981, she married Bernard Alexandre. Alexandre was an active member of the Association pour le droit de mourir dans la dignité ("Association for the Right to Die with Dignity"; ADMD).

Until the 2015 book Solange s'engage dans la resistance (Solange Joins the Resistance) by Antoine Voulard, she spoke little of her role in the French Resistance. She wrote in the book's introduction "As I saw it, I had simply done my duty when it was required, at the moment it was needed".

=== Death ===
Alexandre died at a nursing home in Le Mans on 8 November 2026, at the age of 104.

== Recognition ==
On 17 September 2022, on the occasion of Alexandre's one hundredth birthday, the town of Loir en Vallée (Ruillé-sur-Loir), which had already made Alexandre an honorary citizen, renamed the square at its town hall "Solange Dubuisson Alexandre". She had until then refused the honour but then agreed, saying "... so that no one forgets".

On 10 November 2026, President Emmanuel Macron summarized her contributions, concluding: "With the passing of Solange Alexandre, we lose an exemplary figure of the French Resistance. She sought no reward, weighed no risks, and asked of France no honour other than the privilege of serving her country."

== Awards ==
- Knight of the Legion of Honour (8 November 2024)—Twice before receiving this award, she had turned it down, believing that she had only been doing her duty.
- Croix de Guerre 1939–1945
- Resistance Medal (15 October 1945)
- Volunteer Combatant's Cross 1939–1945
- Cross of the Resistance Volunteer Combatant
- 1939–1945 Commemorative war medal (France) with the Liberation clasp

== See also ==
- Organisation civile et militaire (OCM)
- Association pour le droit de mourir dans la dignité (in French)
