= Franciade (poem) =

French poem

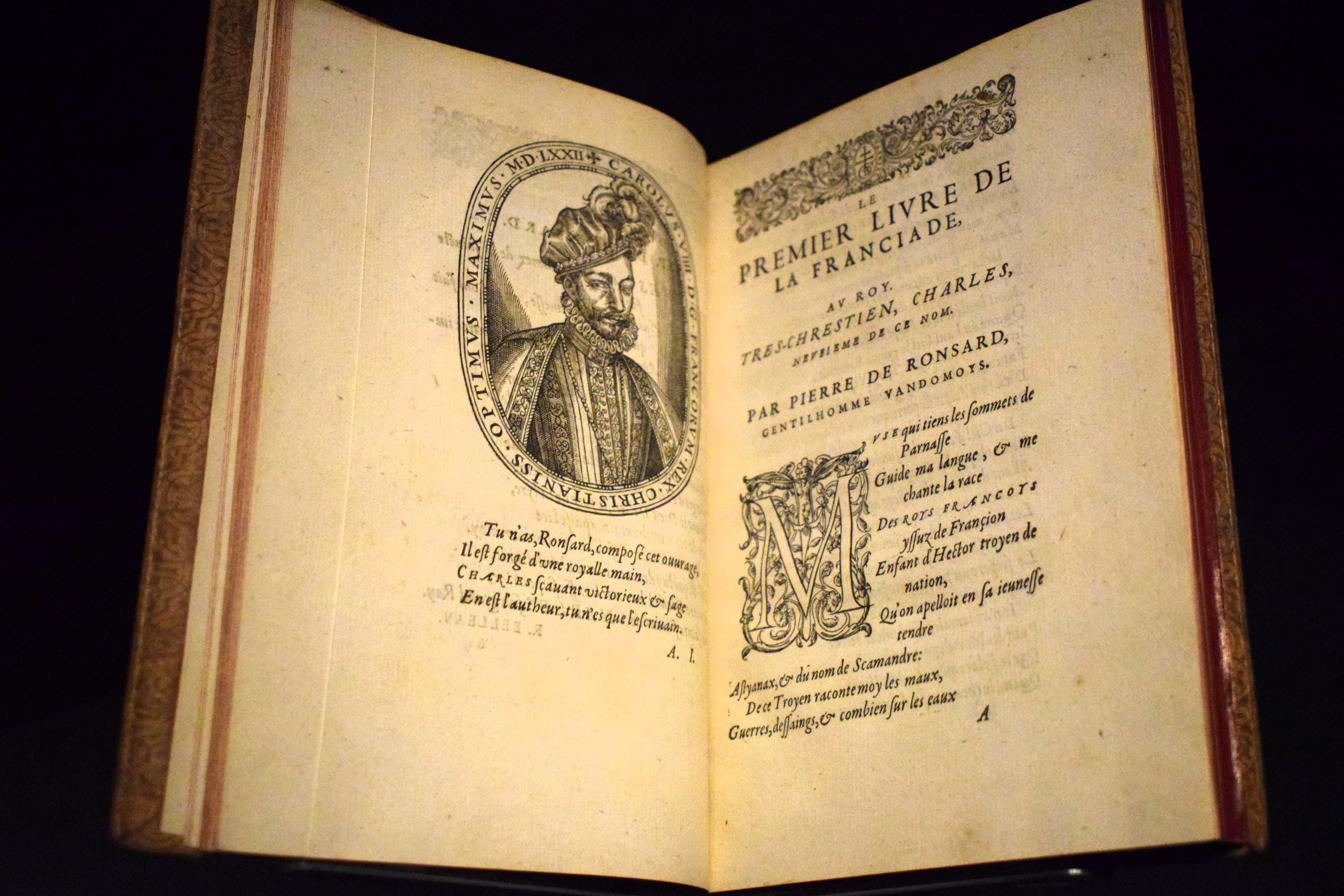

La Franciade (known in English as the Franciad) is an unfinished epic poem written in decasyllabic verse by Pierre de Ronsard. Ronsard began writing the poem in the 1540s for Henry II of France, but it was only in 1572 that the poet published, now for Charles IX, the first four books of a planned twenty-four. Various reasons have been given to explain why the poem was never finished. Obviously, the death of his dedicatee Charles IX meant that Ronsard would have to have made certain changes. Another factor might have been the verse form: Ronsard wrote in decasyllables, not alexandrines. Other reasons, too, have been put forward. More recently, it has been stated that "[any] attempt to pin down why the Franciade was left unfinished, while potentially interesting, is probably futile" and that "we must read it despite [the fact it is unfinished], not as a fragment of what might have been, but as a text in its own right".

== Plot ==
The poem begins in Epirus, where its hero Francus is living a lazy life with his mother Andromache and his uncle Helenus. The poem claims that Francus (the new name of Astyanax) did not die (as Homer wrote in the Iliad), but that he was saved and awaits a new mission: to found France. Jupiter, however, hopes that Francus will give up his lazy ways and set off on his mission. He thus sends down Mercury to remind him of his destiny. Francus eventually builds ships and sets sail. The second book opens with the tale of Francus' journey and shipwreck. He lands on the island of Crete and is welcomed by Prince Dicée. Francus saves the prince's son, Orée, from a giant, Phovére, and the prince's two daughters fall in love with him. The third book is focused on the love story between Francus and one of the sisters, Clymène, who eventually dies, whereas the fourth and final book is mainly given over to the other sister Hyante, who delivers to Francus a prophecy about how he will give travel and eventually found France. Most of the book thus takes place on the island of Crete, whose representation owes much both to classical sources and contemporary travel narratives.

== Reception ==
Ever since Sainte-Beuve published his Tableau historique et critique de la poésie et du théâtre français du XVIe siècle in 1828, the Franciad has generally been considered a failure. But that was not the case when the poem was first published, as more recent scholars are starting to realize. Jean Braybrook, for one, notes that until recently "critics have tended simply to see the epic as a failure" but that "in so doing, they have overlooked the interest with which it was originally received [...] and the imitations it prompted". Jean-Claude Ternaux, too, has written that it is "historically incorrect" to state that the poem was not a success at the time. When Ronsard died, in fact, the poet Jacques du Perron's funeral speech called Ronsard a "genius" and an "oracle" specifically because of the Franciad. Recent scholarship is indeed pointing towards a changing of the tide, as the poem's political, historical, and poetic value is evaluated in new ways.

== Literary context ==
François Rigolot has stated that Ronsard wanted to "give birth to France" by writing the Franciad, another way of saying that writing an epic in Renaissance France was a kind of national project. Fellow Pléiade poet Joachim Du Bellay had indeed written in his Defense and illustration of the French Tongue, that writing a French epic was of utmost importance and that it would allow the French language to "hold its head high".

== English translation ==
The Franciad has been available in English since 2010. The English version by Phillip John Usher begins:

Muse atop the summits of Parnassus,
Steer my speech and sing for me that race
Of French kings descended from Francion,
Hector’s son and of Trojan stock,
Who in his tender childhood was called
Astyanax or by the name Scamandrius.
Tell me of this Trojan’s misfortunes,
Of the wars he fought, of his mission,
And tell me how many times on the seas
(Despite Neptune and Juno) he overcame Fortune
And how many times on solid ground he escaped
From danger, before going on to build the walls of Paris.

The English translation has been well received by critics: Kathleen Wine called it "a vibrant and highly readable translation," adding that "Usher manages both to make the poem accessible to readers […] while nonetheless endowing it with a vigorous rhythm that lends itself to reading aloud," and summarizing that the translation is "[a] work of scholarship and a labor of love." The edition, published by AMS Press, also includes an extensive introduction to the poem's style, historical context, use of mythology, and other issues.
