= La Chapelle-Gaugain =

- Part of Loir en Vallée
- Location of La Chapelle-Gaugain
- Location within France Location within Pays de la Loire
- Coordinates: 47°47′57″N 0°40′48″E
- Country: France
- Region: Pays de la Loire
- Department: Sarthe
- Arrondissement: La Flèche
- Canton: Montval-sur-Loir
- Commune: Loir en Vallée
- Area^{1}: 10.7 km^{2} (4.1 sq mi)
- Population (2022): 319
  - Density: 29.8/km^{2} (77.2/sq mi)
- Time zone: UTC+01:00 (CET)
  - Summer (DST): UTC+02:00 (CEST)
- Postal code: 72400
- ^{1} French Land Register data, which excludes lakes, ponds, glaciers > 1 km^{2} (0.386 sq mi or 247 acres) and river estuaries.

La Chapelle-Gaugain (French pronunciation: [la ʃapɛl ɡoɡɛ̃]) is a former commune in the Sarthe department in the Pays de la Loire region in north-western France. On 1 January 2017, it was merged into the new commune Loir en Vallée. Its population was 319 in 2022.

== See also ==
- Communes of the Sarthe department
