= Lavenay =

- Part of Loir en Vallée
- Location of Lavenay
- Location within France Location within Pays de la Loire
- Coordinates: 47°47′30″N 0°42′05″E
- Country: France
- Region: Pays de la Loire
- Department: Sarthe
- Arrondissement: La Flèche
- Canton: Montval-sur-Loir
- Commune: Loir en Vallée
- Area^{1}: 7.8 km^{2} (3.0 sq mi)
- Population (2022): 301
  - Density: 39/km^{2} (100/sq mi)
- Time zone: UTC+01:00 (CET)
  - Summer (DST): UTC+02:00 (CEST)
- Postal code: 72310
- ^{1} French Land Register data, which excludes lakes, ponds, glaciers > 1 km^{2} (0.386 sq mi or 247 acres) and river estuaries.

Lavenay (French pronunciation: [lavnɛ]) is a former commune in the Sarthe department in the region of Pays de la Loire in north-western France. On 1 January 2017, it was merged into the new commune Loir en Vallée. Its population was 301 in 2022.

== Geography ==
The Braye forms most of the commune's south-eastern border, then flows into the Loir, which forms most of its south-western border.

== Transport ==
The railway station is at Pont-de-Braye, a hamlet south of Lavenay.

== See also ==
- Communes of the Sarthe department
