= Braye (river) =

River in France

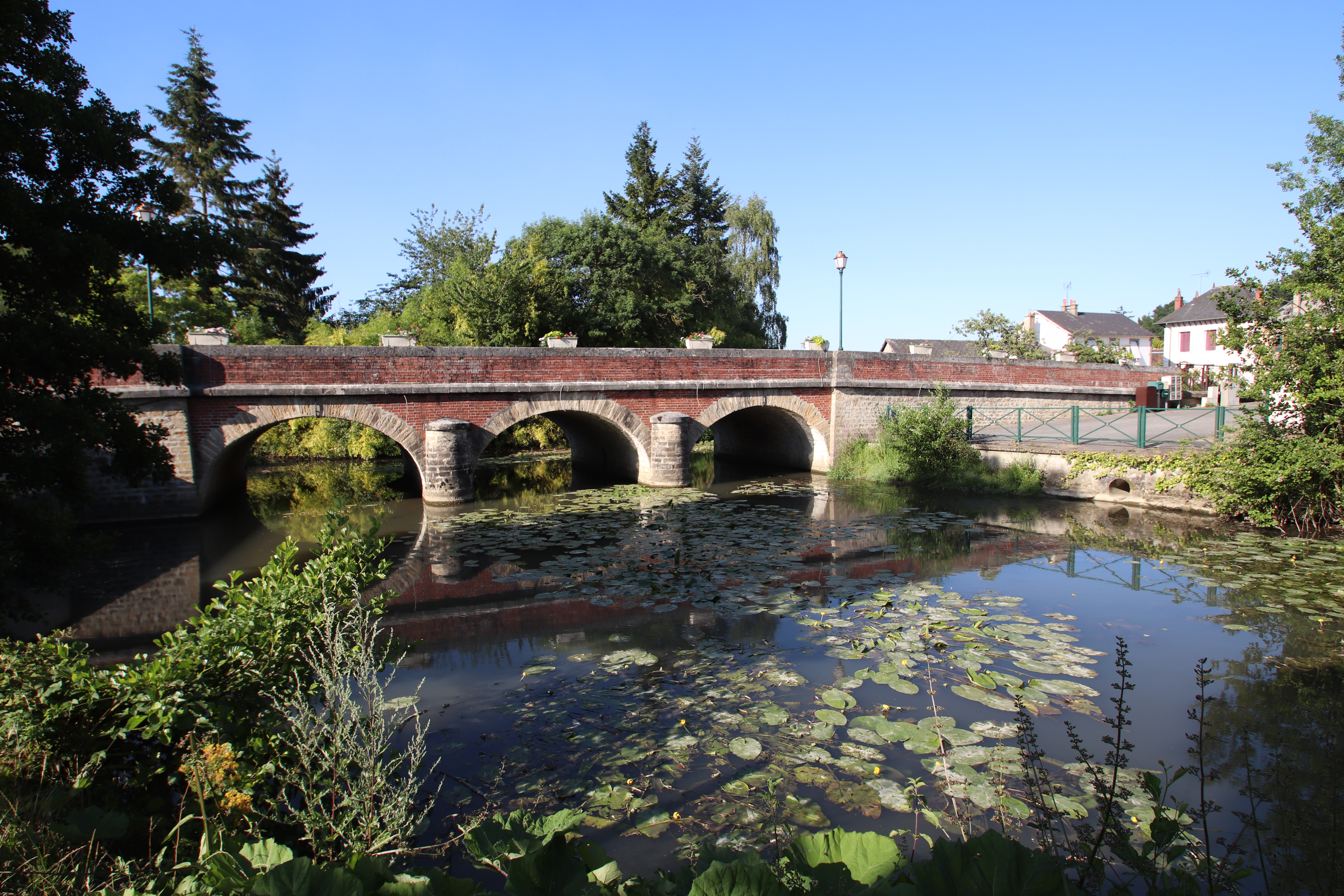
- The Braye in Vibraye

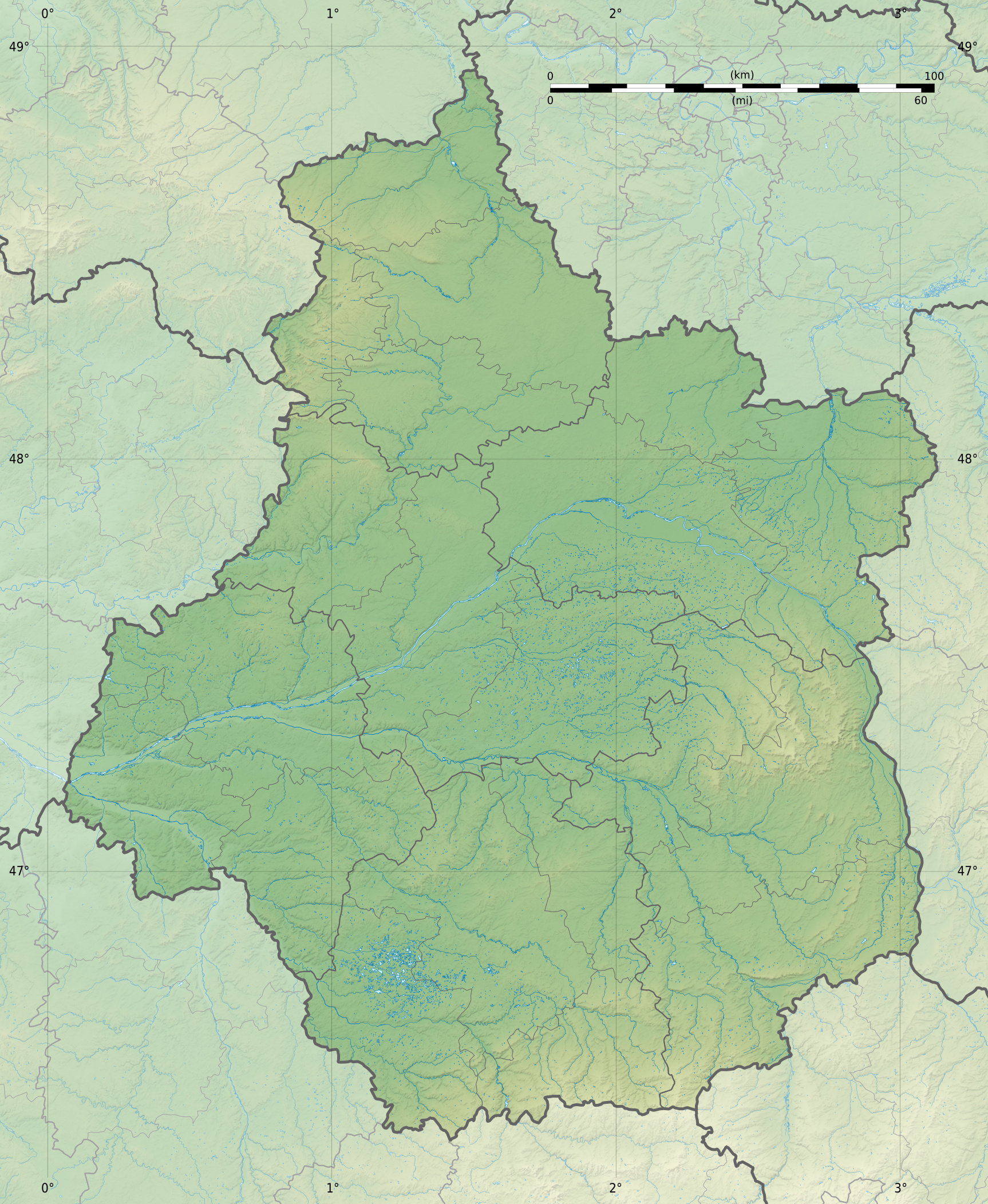
- Location within France Location within Centre-Val de Loire

Location
- Country: France

Physical characteristics
- Source
  - location: Perche
  - elevation: 190 m (620 ft)
- Mouth
  - location: Loir
  - coordinates: 47°45′57″N 0°41′0″E
  - elevation: 56 m (184 ft)
- Length: 75.1 km (46.7 mi)

Basin features
- Progression: Loir→ Sarthe→ Maine→ Loire→ Atlantic Ocean

The Braye (French pronunciation: [bʁɛ]) is a river of France, and a right tributary of the river Loir. Its source is in Ceton in the Orne department. The Braye is 75.1 kilometres (46.7 mi) long, and crosses Savigny-sur-Braye. Among its tributaries are the Grenne, Anille and Tusson. It flows into the Loir near Pont-de-Braye, in Lavenay.

== Places along the river ==
- Sarthe: Vibraye
- Loir-et-Cher: Souday, Sargé-sur-Braye, Savigny-sur-Braye
- Sarthe: Bessé-sur-Braye,
- Loir-et-Cher: Sougé, Couture-sur-Loir
- Sarthe: Lavenay
