= Bas-Vendômois =

District in Vendôme, France

The Bas-Vendômois is a small district in central- western France, consisting of the 14 communes of the canton of Montoire-sur-le-Loir, in the arrondissement of Vendôme, département of Loir-et-Cher, France. The capital of Bas-Vendômois is Montoire-sur-le-Loir.

== History ==
The area corresponds to the central portion of the east-west flowing Loir valley. Before the French Revolution the area depended administratively on Vendôme and was part of the Orléanais province, but ecclesiastically on the Diocese of Le Mans in the Tours province. The division thus corresponds to that between the late Roman provinces of Tertia Lugdunensis (Tours) and Quarta Lugdunensis (Sens) and the civitates of the Cenomani and of the Carnutes respectively.

The Bas-Vendômois was part of the Frankish kingdom of Neustria. The area was fought over during struggles between the Angevin Plantagenêts and the French monarchy. There are fortified castles at Montoire-sur-le-Loir and Lavardin. There are a number of Romanesque churches, e.g. Saint-Jacques-des-Guérets, the chapel of St. Giles at Montoire. The area shared in the general prosperity of the later 15th century and the Renaissance- e.g. Manor of La Possonnière at Couture-sur-Loir.
