= Saint-Jacques-des-Guérets =

- Commune
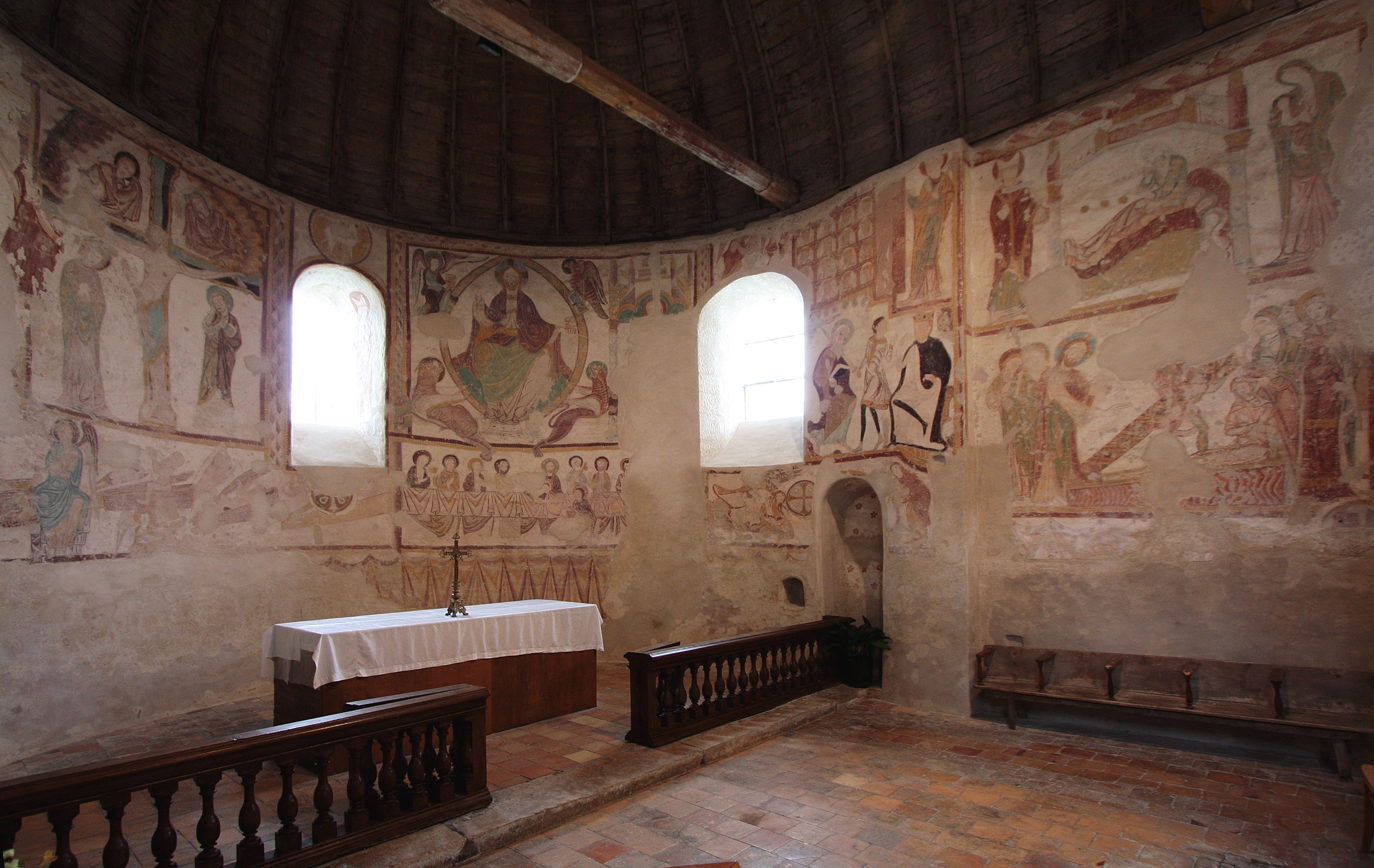
- The interior of the church in Saint-Jacques-des-Guérets

- Coat of arms
- Location of Saint-Jacques-des-Guérets
- Location within France Location within Centre-Val de Loire
- Coordinates: 47°46′31″N 0°47′39″E
- Country: France
- Region: Centre-Val de Loire
- Department: Loir-et-Cher
- Arrondissement: Vendôme
- Canton: Montoire-sur-le-Loir
- Intercommunality: CA Territoires Vendômois

Government
  - Mayor (2020–2026): Loïc Saillard
- Area^{1}: 1.81 km^{2} (0.70 sq mi)
- Elevation: 65 m (213 ft)
- Highest elevation: 67 m (220 ft)
- Lowest elevation: 60 m (200 ft)
- Population (2023): 99
  - Density: 55/km^{2} (140/sq mi)
- Time zone: UTC+01:00 (CET)
  - Summer (DST): UTC+02:00 (CEST)
- INSEE/Postal code: 41215 /41800
- ^{1} French Land Register data, which excludes lakes, ponds, glaciers > 1 km^{2} (0.386 sq mi or 247 acres) and river estuaries.

Saint-Jacques-des-Guérets (French pronunciation: [sɛ̃ ʒak de ɡeʁɛ]) is a commune in the Loir-et-Cher department in central France.

== Population ==
Historical population
Year	Pop.	±% p.a.
1968	113	—
1975	106	−0.91%
1982	90	−2.31%
1990	76	−2.09%
1999	78	+0.29%
2007	85	+1.08%
2012	94	+2.03%
2017	91	−0.65%
2023	99	+1.41%
Source: INSEE

== Sights ==
Lying on one of the traditional pilgrimage routes to Santiago da Compostella, across the river from the partly troglodyte hillside of Trôo, its small church of St. James the Great is celebrated for its Romanesque frescoes and western arch.

== See also ==
- Trôo
- Bas-Vendômois
- Communes of the Loir-et-Cher department
