= Louis Becq de Fouquières =

Louis Aimé Victor Becq de Fouquières (17 December 1831 – 22 October 1887) was a French man of letters from Paris.

== Biography ==
His family came from the Pas-de-Calais. He gave up a military career and became known for his critical editions on the work of André Chénier. He also published selected French Renaissance poetry by Pierre de Ronsard, François de Malherbe, Jean Antoine de Baïf and Joachim du Bellay. He also wrote on Aspasia of Miletus, French versification, and theatre, and was an early historian of ancient board games.
