= Jeanne Rij-Rousseau =

French painter

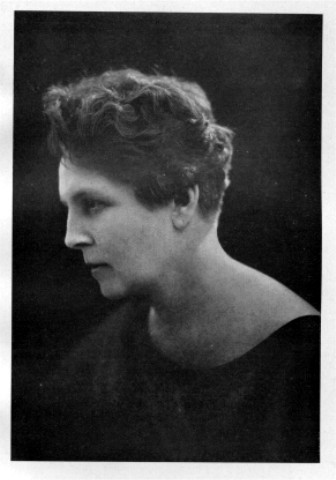
- Born: Jeanne Caffier (June 10, 1870; Candé, Maine-et-Loire, France
- Died: October 22, 1956; Savigny-sur-Braye, France
- Movement: Vibrism, Cubism, Section d'Or

Jeanne Rij-Rousseau (June 10, 1870 – October 22, 1956) was a French Cubist painter and an art theoretician. Her estate has been scattered throughout the world. Paintings are trafficked in N.Y., Chicago, London, and Paris. Some works are in Parisian museums, in Blois, and in Grenoble, but especially in private collectors' homes. Research on this painter of the French Modern Age is still in its beginnings.

== Biography ==
Rij-Rousseau was born in Candé. From 1890 on, she lived in Paris and moved in an artistic circle with painters of the "Ile de la Grande Jatte" in Montmartre. She was a student of Maurice Denis and Paul Sérusier. Sérusier's ideas regarding the coherence between music and painting gave rise to her theory of vibrism, which is a middle course between the Synthetic Cubism of the pre-war period and Larionov and Goncharova's Rayonism.

She was united to Juan Gris in a lifelong and intimate friendship. From 1908 on, Rij-Rousseau exhibited her works in Salon des Indépendants, from 1911 on, in Salon d'Automne and from 1924 on, in Salon des Tuileries. In 1920, she was a member of the artist circle called Section d'Or. She frequently traveled to South France, especially to Céret, and also to Germany, Belgium and Switzerland. Her paintings were displayed in Zurich, Brussels, New York, and Boston.

In Aubusson and Beauvais' manufactories large-size tapestries designed by her were produced. In 1925, she was awarded a gold medal for one of them in the first Arts Décoratifs' exhibition. Guillaume Apollinaire named her a "searcher", and her colour choices were admired by Florent Fels and André Salmon.

Also in 1925, Rij-Rousseau founded the Association of Modern-Age Female Painters. She exhibited with Suzanne Duchamp and Marie Laurencin, among others. Aside from Colette, Rij-Rousseau's biography was published in the book, Führende Frauen Europas by Elga Kern as a representative of French art.

Her fame did not last long, and in 1956 she died lonely, impoverished and forgotten in her great-niece's house in Savigny-sur-Braye. Her final exhibition in Château de Blois in 1959 attracted little notice, and the whereabouts of the 70 exhibited paintings are still unknown.
