= Thomas Sébillet =

French jurist, essayist, and neo-Platonist grammarian

Thomas Sébillet (1512–1589) was a French jurist, essayist, and neo-Platonist grammarian. He is now remembered for his Art Poétique (Poetic Art) from 1548, on French verse. He was strongly contradicted later by Joachim du Bellay, whose art poétique became normative. This "decapitation of richesse" led to a centralisation of language, too (additionally to the concentration of political power).

Equally advocate in Parliament, he was a friend of Michel de l'Hospital, Étienne Pasquier and Pierre de l'Estoile.

== Works ==
- Art poetique franc̜ois. Pour l'instruction dés jeunes studieus, & encor peu avancéz en la pöesie franc̜oise (1548) Online text (in French)
- La Louenge des femmes, invention extraite du commentaire de Pantagruel, sur l'Androgyne de Platon (1551) Online text (in French)
- Contramours. L'antéros ou contr amour, de Messire Baptiste Fulgose, jadis duc de Gennes. Le dialogue de Baptiste Platine, contre les folles amours. Paradoxe contre l'amour, traduction de l'ouvrage de Battista Fregoso (1453-1504), doge de Gênes (1581)
