= Troo =

- Commune
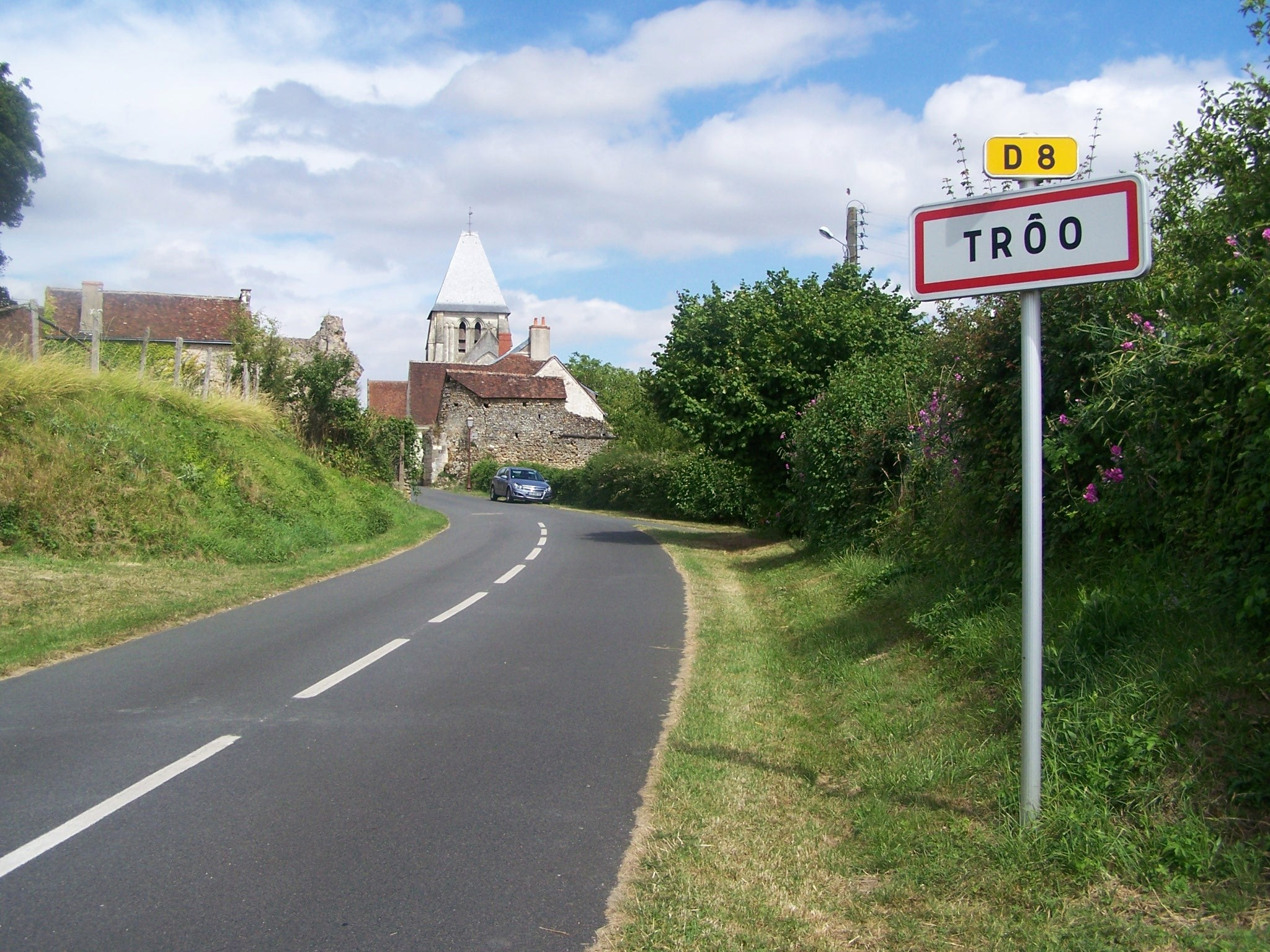

- Coat of arms
- Location of Troo
- Location within France Location within Centre-Val de Loire
- Coordinates: 47°46′40″N 0°47′55″E
- Country: France
- Region: Centre-Val de Loire
- Department: Loir-et-Cher
- Arrondissement: Vendôme
- Canton: Montoire-sur-le-Loir
- Intercommunality: CA Territoires Vendômois

Government
  - Mayor (2020–2026): Jean-Luc Nexon
- Area^{1}: 14.19 km^{2} (5.48 sq mi)
- Elevation: 83 m (272 ft)
- Highest elevation: 154 m (505 ft)
- Lowest elevation: 58 m (190 ft)
- Population (2023): 309
  - Density: 21.8/km^{2} (56.4/sq mi)
- Time zone: UTC+01:00 (CET)
  - Summer (DST): UTC+02:00 (CEST)
- INSEE/Postal code: 41265 /41800
- ^{1} French Land Register data, which excludes lakes, ponds, glaciers > 1 km^{2} (0.386 sq mi or 247 acres) and river estuaries.

Troo (French pronunciation: [tʁo]; also: Trôo) is a commune of the Loir-et-Cher department in central France.

== Population ==
Historical population
Year	Pop.	±% p.a.
1968	433	—
1975	428	−0.17%
1982	337	−3.36%
1990	320	−0.64%
1999	301	−0.68%
2007	326	+1.00%
2012	315	−0.68%
2017	297	−1.17%
2023	309	+0.66%
Source: INSEE

== Sights ==
The village, which is partly troglodytic, consisting of cave-dwellings, is dominated by the collégiale or Saint Martin's church. It overlooks the small church of Saint-Jacques-des-Guérets, known for its Romanesque wall paintings.

== See also ==
- Communes of the Loir-et-Cher department
