= Poncé-sur-le-Loir =

- Part of Loir en Vallée
- Location of Poncé-sur-le-Loir
- Location within France Location within Pays de la Loire
- Coordinates: 47°45′46″N 0°39′22″E
- Country: France
- Region: Pays de la Loire
- Department: Sarthe
- Arrondissement: La Flèche
- Canton: Montval-sur-Loir
- Commune: Loir en Vallée
- Area^{1}: 6.92 km^{2} (2.67 sq mi)
- Highest elevation: 153 m (502 ft)
- Lowest elevation: 55 m (180 ft)
- Population (2022): 314
  - Density: 45.4/km^{2} (118/sq mi)
- Time zone: UTC+01:00 (CET)
  - Summer (DST): UTC+02:00 (CEST)
- Postal code: 72340
- ^{1} French Land Register data, which excludes lakes, ponds, glaciers > 1 km^{2} (0.386 sq mi or 247 acres) and river estuaries.

Poncé-sur-le-Loir is a former commune in the Sarthe département in the region of Pays de la Loire in north-western France. On 1 January 2017, it was merged into the new commune Loir en Vallée. Its inhabitants are called Poncéens.

== Sights ==
The Romanesque church of St. Julien of Le Mans stands on a hillside. It possesses a saddleback tower and contains notable Romanesque wall paintings depicting notably the siege of Antioch in 1098. The château is noted for its Renaissance staircase.

== Economy ==
The village, which developed following early industrial (mill) activity, contains potteries and other artisan activities, and also produces Jasnières wine.

== See also ==
- Communes of the Sarthe department
