= Vibraye =

- Commune
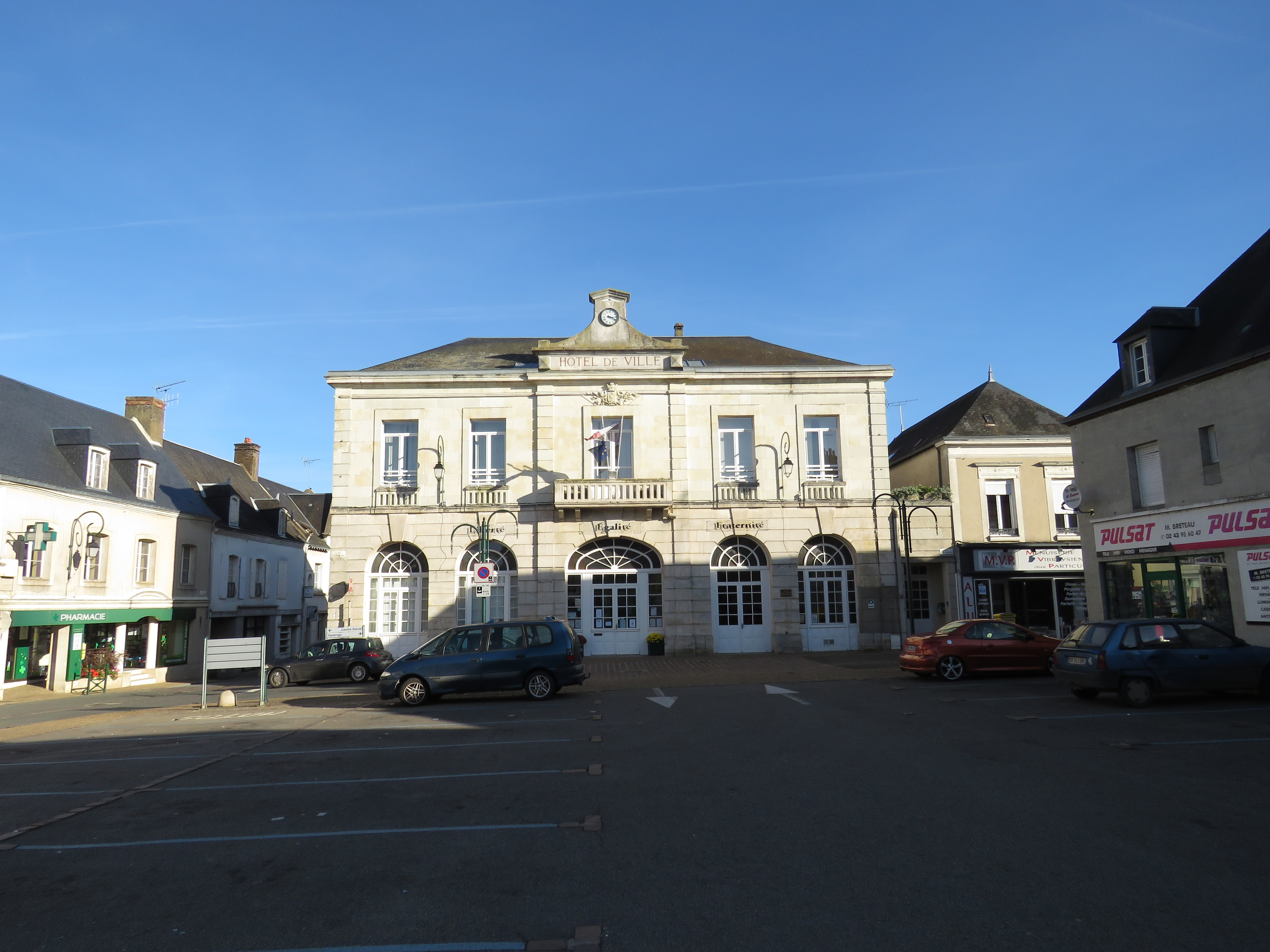
- The town hall of Vibraye

- Coat of arms
- Location of Vibraye
- Location within France Location within Pays de la Loire
- Coordinates: 48°03′34″N 0°44′12″E
- Country: France
- Region: Pays de la Loire
- Department: Sarthe
- Arrondissement: Mamers
- Canton: Saint-Calais
- Intercommunality: Vallées de la Braye et de l'Anille

Government
  - Mayor (2020–2026): Dominique Flament
- Area^{1}: 43.62 km^{2} (16.84 sq mi)
- Highest elevation: 199 m (653 ft)
- Lowest elevation: 107 m (351 ft)
- Population (2023): 2,523
  - Density: 57.84/km^{2} (149.8/sq mi)
- Demonym(s): Vibraysien, Vibraysienne
- Time zone: UTC+01:00 (CET)
  - Summer (DST): UTC+02:00 (CEST)
- INSEE/Postal code: 72373 /72320
- ^{1} French Land Register data, which excludes lakes, ponds, glaciers > 1 km^{2} (0.386 sq mi or 247 acres) and river estuaries.

Vibraye (French pronunciation: [vibʁɛ]) is a commune in the Sarthe department in the region of Pays de la Loire in north-western France.

== History ==
Vibraye was involved in the 1906 Grand Prix de l'Automobile Club de France, the world's first motoring Grand Prix. The D1 towards Saint-Calais and La Ferté-Bernard formed a side of the triangular course.

== Population ==
Historical population
Year	Pop.	±% p.a.
1968	2,296	—
1975	2,391	+0.58%
1982	2,591	+1.15%
1990	2,609	+0.09%
1999	2,587	−0.09%
2007	2,631	+0.21%
2012	2,607	−0.18%
2017	2,553	−0.42%
2023	2,523	−0.20%
Source: INSEE

== See also ==
- Braye (river)
- Communes of the Sarthe department
