= Savigny-sur-Braye =

- Commune
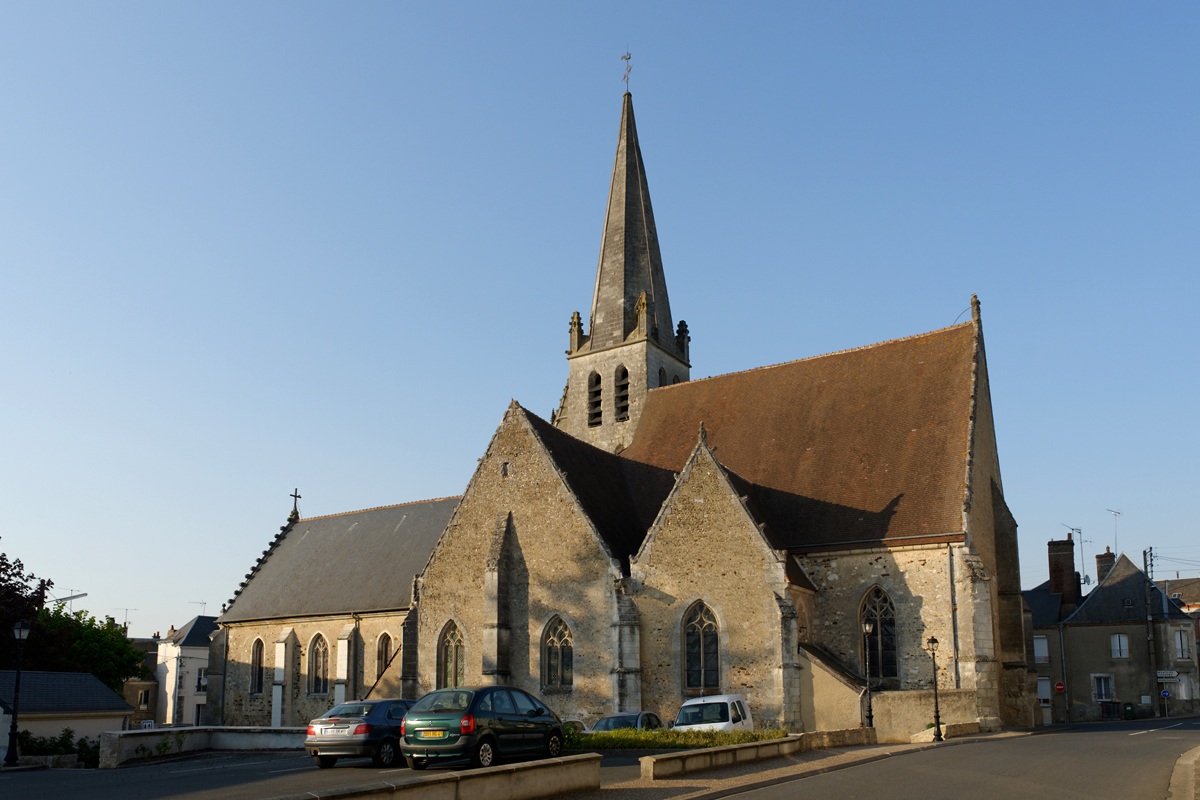
- Church of Saint-Pierre

- Coat of arms
- Location of Savigny-sur-Braye
- Location within France Location within Centre-Val de Loire
- Coordinates: 47°52′49″N 0°48′36″E
- Country: France
- Region: Centre-Val de Loire
- Department: Loir-et-Cher
- Arrondissement: Vendôme
- Canton: Le Perche
- Intercommunality: CA Territoires Vendômois

Government
  - Mayor (2020–2026): Joël Prenant
- Area^{1}: 67.18 km^{2} (25.94 sq mi)
- Elevation: 87 m (285 ft)
- Highest elevation: 166 m (545 ft)
- Lowest elevation: 74 m (243 ft)
- Population (2023): 1,962
  - Density: 29.21/km^{2} (75.64/sq mi)
- Time zone: UTC+01:00 (CET)
  - Summer (DST): UTC+02:00 (CEST)
- INSEE/Postal code: 41238 /41360
- ^{1} French Land Register data, which excludes lakes, ponds, glaciers > 1 km^{2} (0.386 sq mi or 247 acres) and river estuaries.

Savigny-sur-Braye (French pronunciation: [saviɲi syʁ bʁɛ], literally Savigny on Braye) is a commune in the Loir-et-Cher department of central France.

== Population ==
Historical population
Year	Pop.	±% p.a.
1968	2,349	—
1975	2,212	−0.85%
1982	2,015	−1.32%
1990	2,043	+0.17%
1999	2,203	+0.84%
2007	2,196	−0.04%
2012	2,128	−0.63%
2017	2,017	−1.07%
2023	1,962	−0.46%
Source: INSEE

== Personalities ==
- Jeanne Rij-Rousseau, (born 10 June 1870 in Candé – died 22 October 1956 in Savigny-sur-Braye) was a French Cubist painter and an art theoretician

== See also ==
- Braye (river)
- Communes of the Loir-et-Cher department
