= Rosa 'Pink Wonder' =

Rose cultivar

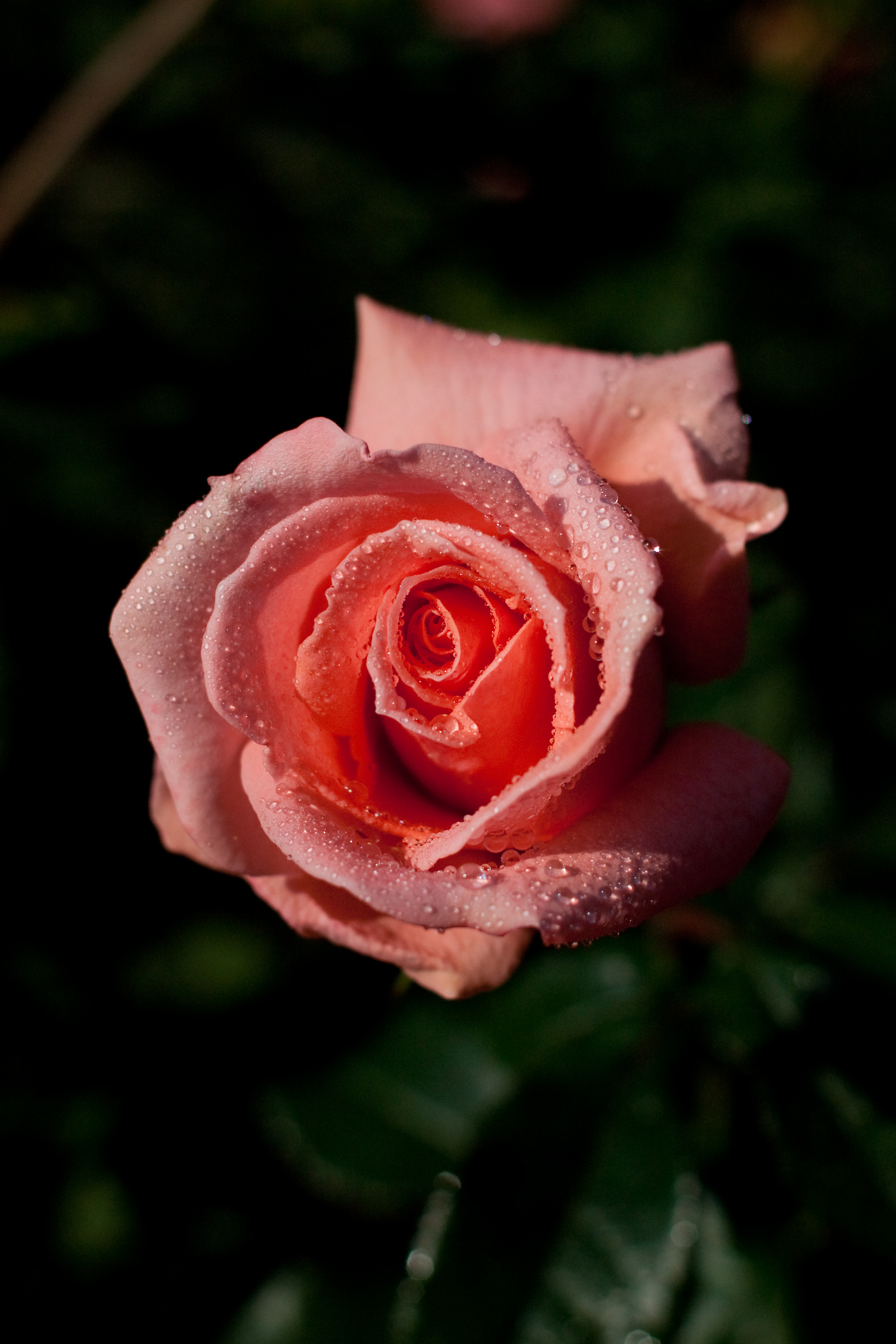
- Hybrid parentage: 'Zambra' ® × {'Sarabande' ® × ['Goldilocks' × 'Fashion']}
- Cultivar group: Floribunda
- Cultivar: Rosa 'Pink Wonder'
- Marketing names: 'Kalinka', 'MEIhartfor'
- Origin: Meilland, 1970, France

Rosa 'Pink Wonder' (synonyms 'Kalinka', 'MEIhartfor') is a light pink floribunda rose cultivar. It was bred in 1970 by Meilland International in France.

== Description ==
The flowers have an average diameter of 9 cm and a strong, sweet fragrance. They appear in small clusters of 3–7 throughout the season. 'Pink Wonder' has brilliant, dark green leaves and almost no thorns. The shrub reaches a height of 60 to 130 cm and a width of 1 m. It is winter hardy up to −23.3 °C (USDA Zone 6a).

== Awards ==
- Madrid Gold Medal 1969
- Belfast Gold Medal 1972

The sport 'Climbing Pink Wonder' is also popular, grows about 5 m tall and blooms repeatedly.

== Sources ==
- Help Me Find
- Charles & Brigid Quest-Ritson: Rosen: die große Enzyklopädie / The Royal Horticultural Society; Übersetzung durch Susanne Bonn; Redaktion: Agnes Pahler; Starnberg: Dorling Kindersley, 2004, ISBN 3-8310-0590-7
