= Loir en Vallée =

- Commune
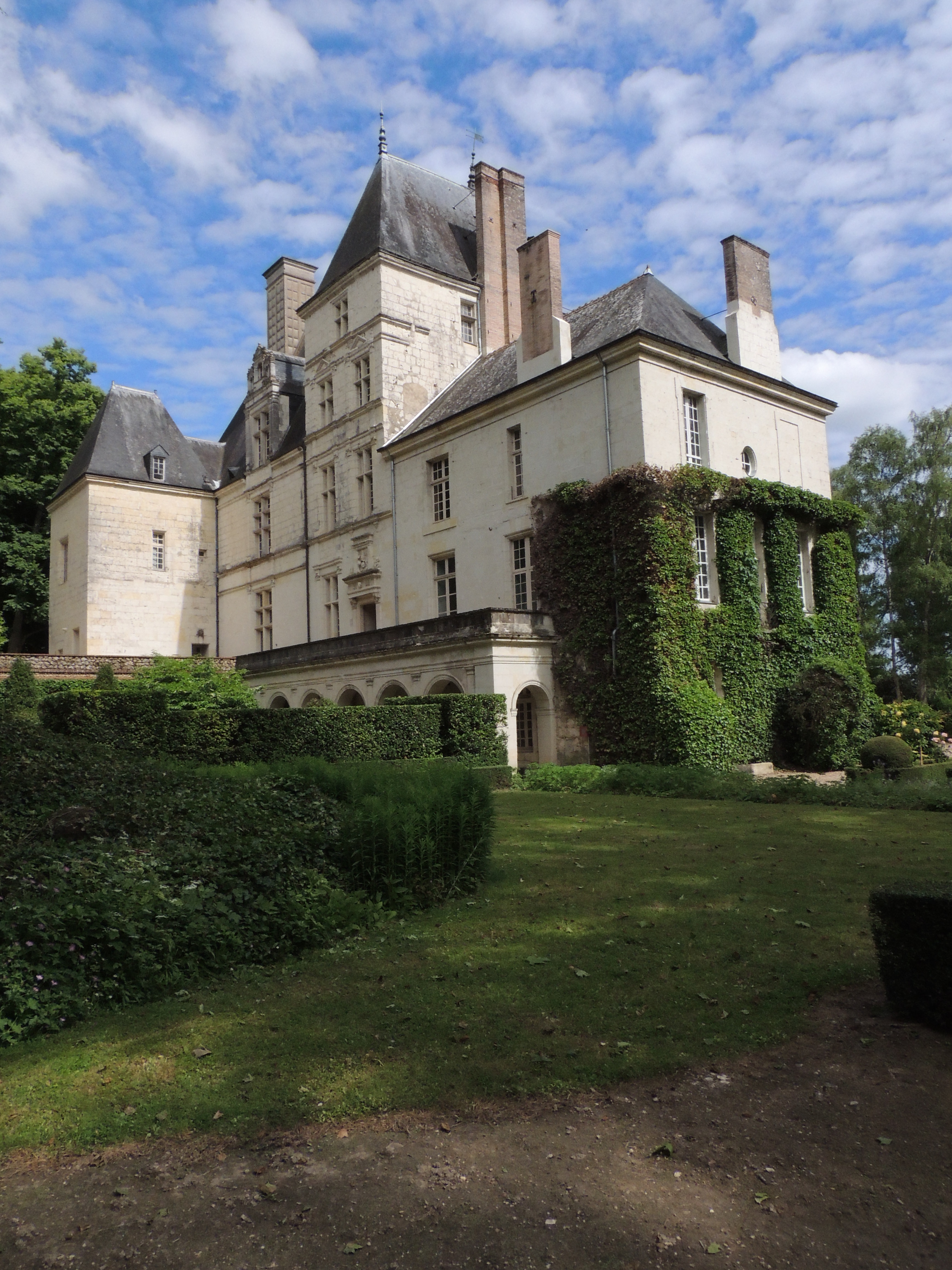
- The château of Poncé
- Location of Loir en Vallée
- Location within France Location within Pays de la Loire
- Coordinates: 47°45′04″N 0°37′16″E
- Country: France
- Region: Pays de la Loire
- Department: Sarthe
- Arrondissement: La Flèche
- Canton: Montval-sur-Loir
- Intercommunality: Loir-Lucé-Bercé

Government
  - Mayor (2020–2026): Galiène Cohu
- Area^{1}: 64.76 km^{2} (25.00 sq mi)
- Population (2023): 2,044
  - Density: 31.56/km^{2} (81.75/sq mi)
- Time zone: UTC+01:00 (CET)
  - Summer (DST): UTC+02:00 (CEST)
- INSEE/Postal code: 72262 /72310, 72340
- ^{1} French Land Register data, which excludes lakes, ponds, glaciers > 1 km^{2} (0.386 sq mi or 247 acres) and river estuaries.

Loir en Vallée (French pronunciation: [lwaʁ ɑ̃ vale], literally Loir in Valley) is a commune in the department of Sarthe, northwestern France. The municipality was established on 1 January 2017 by merger of the former communes of Ruillé-sur-Loir (the seat), La Chapelle-Gaugain, Lavenay and Poncé-sur-le-Loir.

Ruillé-sur-Loir was the first home to the Brothers of St. Joseph, now the Congregation of Holy Cross associated with the University of Notre Dame.

On 17 September 2022, on the occasion of Solange Alexandre's one hundredth birthday, the town of which had already made war hero Alexandre an honorary citizen, renamed the square at its town hall "Solange Dubuisson Alexandre".

== Population ==
Population data refer to the area corresponding with the commune as of January 2025.

Historical population
Year	Pop.	±% p.a.
1968	2,347	—
1975	2,218	−0.80%
1982	2,410	+1.19%
1990	2,388	−0.11%
1999	2,321	−0.32%
2007	2,278	−0.23%
2012	2,227	−0.45%
2017	2,173	−0.49%
2023	2,044	−1.01%
Source: INSEE

== See also ==
- Communes of the Sarthe department
