= Bessé-sur-Braye =

- Commune
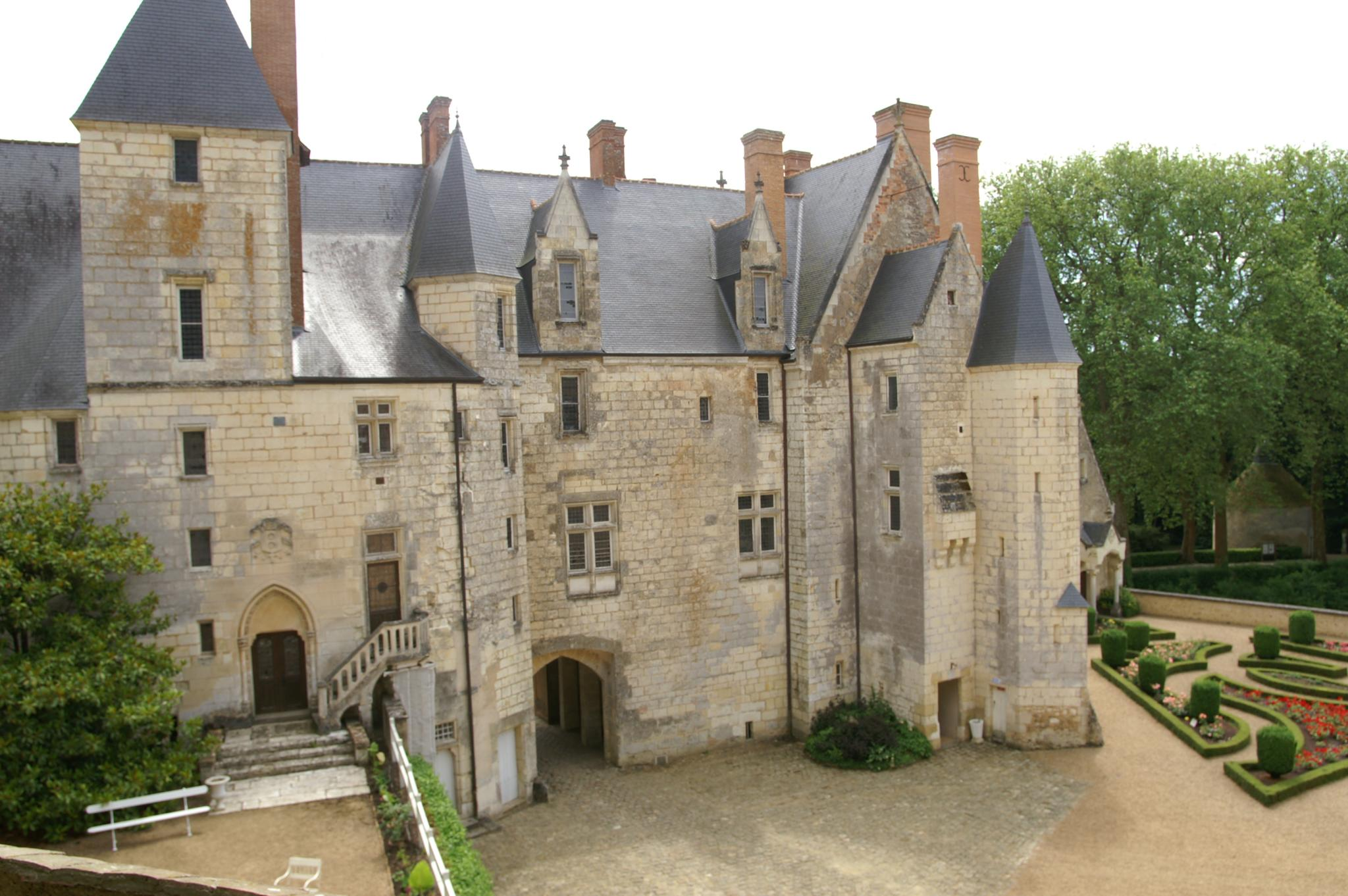
- The château of Courtanvaux

- Coat of arms
- Location of Bessé-sur-Braye
- Location within France Location within Pays de la Loire
- Coordinates: 47°50′02″N 0°44′58″E
- Country: France
- Region: Pays de la Loire
- Department: Sarthe
- Arrondissement: Mamers
- Canton: Saint-Calais

Government
  - Mayor (2020–2026): Jacques Lacoche
- Area^{1}: 20.60 km^{2} (7.95 sq mi)
- Highest elevation: 154 m (505 ft)
- Lowest elevation: 64 m (210 ft)
- Population (2023): 1,972
  - Density: 95.73/km^{2} (247.9/sq mi)
- Demonym(s): Besséen, Besséenne
- Time zone: UTC+01:00 (CET)
  - Summer (DST): UTC+02:00 (CEST)
- INSEE/Postal code: 72035 /72310
- Website: http://www.besse-sur-braye.fr
- ^{1} French Land Register data, which excludes lakes, ponds, glaciers > 1 km^{2} (0.386 sq mi or 247 acres) and river estuaries.

Bessé-sur-Braye (French pronunciation: [bese syʁ bʁɛ], literally Bessé on Braye) is a commune in the Sarthe department in the region of Pays de la Loire in north-western France.

== Population ==
Historical population
Year	Pop.	±% p.a.
1968	2,667	—
1975	3,000	+1.70%
1982	2,919	−0.39%
1990	2,815	−0.45%
1999	2,597	−0.89%
2007	2,443	−0.76%
2012	2,311	−1.10%
2017	2,212	−0.87%
2023	1,972	−1.90%
Source: INSEE

== See also ==
- Braye (river)
- Communes of the Sarthe department
