= La Défense et illustration de la langue française =

Cover of the 1549 edition

La Défense et illustration de la langue française (French pronunciation: [la defɑ̃s e ilystʁɑsjɔ̃ də la lɑ̃ɡ fʁɑ̃sɛːz]; The Defense and Illustration of the French Language) is a literary theory text written during the Renaissance in 1549 by the French poet Joachim du Bellay. It was a manifesto of the ideas of the group originally known as La Brigade, later as La Pléiade. Du Bellay called for "the enrichment of the French language by discreet imitation and borrowing from the language and literary forms of the classics and the works of the Italian Renaissance... In it he asserted that French (was) capable of producing a modern literature equal in quality and expressiveness to that of ancient Greece and Rome."

== Background ==
The text, a plea in favor of the French language, appeared ten years after the Ordinance of Villers-Cotterêts, which imposed French as the language of law and administration in France. Du Bellay wanted to show his gratitude to Francis I of France, who he described as "our good King and father", for his role in the arts and culture: Francis I established the Collège de France, perpetuated the National Library of France, and was a proponent of legal deposit. Du Bellay's goal with the work was to make the French language, considered at the time "barbarous" and "vulgar", an elegant and dignified language.

Du Bellay used in his work several passages from Sperone Speroni's Dialogue on Languages, a 1542 essay which dealt with the Tuscan vernacular (which gave rise to present-day Italian) as well as the erudite languages, Latin and Ancient Greek.

== Summary ==
Du Bellay defends the French language and affirms its equal dignity with Latin and Ancient Greek. One way he chose to advocate the enrichment of the French language was by means of the imitation of ancient authors in classical languages; but at the same time he criticized direct copying via translation, as he felt that translations did not have the same depth and richness of the original text.

== See also ==
- Geoffroy Tory, early French typographer
- Founding texts and events of the French language:
  - Concile of Tours in 813
  - Oaths of Strasbourg
  - Chanson de Roland
  - Novels of Chrétien de Troyes
  - Sequence of Saint Eulalia
