= Pierre de Ronsard =

French poet (1524–1585)

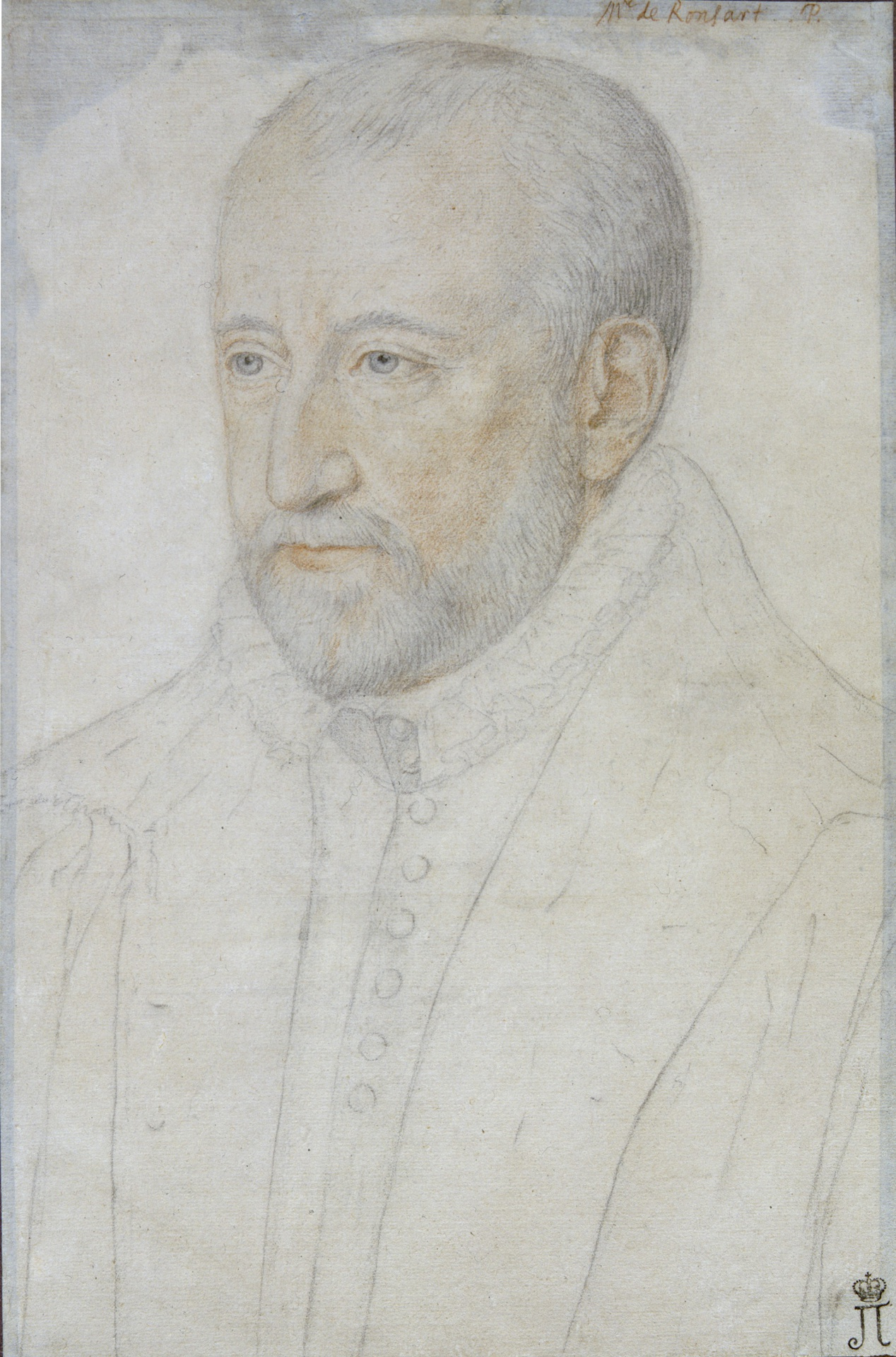
- Born: 11 September 1524; Couture-sur-Loir, France
- Died: 27 December 1585 (aged 61); La Riche, France
- Education: Collège de Navarre
- Occupation: Poet
- Writing career
- Language: Middle French
- Notable works: Les Odes, Les Amours, Sonnets pour Hélène, Les Discours
- Movements: La Pléiade, French Renaissance

Pierre de Ronsard (French pronunciation: [pjɛʁ də ʁɔ̃saʁ]; 11 September 1524 – 27 December 1585) was a French poet. His works include Les Amours de Cassandre (1552), Les Hymnes (1555-1556), Les Discours (1562-1563), La Franciade (1572), and Sonnets pour Hélène (1578).

Ronsard was born at Manoir de la Possonnière in the village of Couture-sur-Loir, Vendômois. His father served Francis I as maître d'hôtel du roi. Ronsard received an education at home before attending the College of Navarre, in Paris, at age nine. He later travelled extensively, including visits to Scotland, Flanders, and Holland. After a hearing impairment halted his diplomatic career, Ronsard dedicated himself to study at the Collège Coqueret. He later became the acknowledged leader of La Pléiade, a group of seven French Renaissance poets.

His works were both admired and criticized throughout his life, and his reputation was established by critics such as Charles Augustin Sainte-Beuve. His poetry is characterized by its peculiar use of language and imagery, and a great variety of metre.

== Early life ==
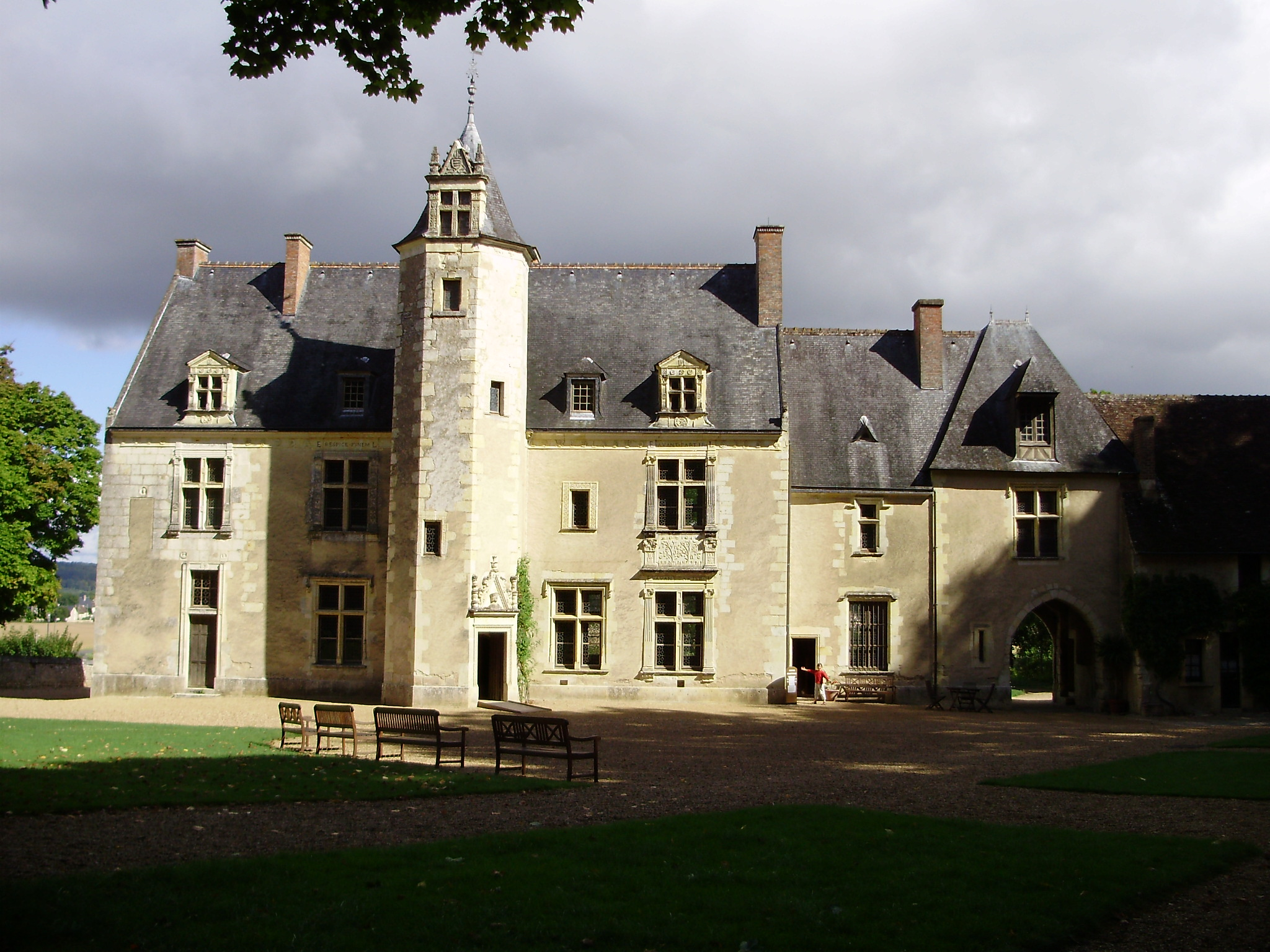
Manoir de la Possonnière, Ronsard's home

Pierre de Ronsard was born at the Manoir de la Possonnière, in the village of Couture-sur-Loir, Vendômois (in present-day Loir-et-Cher). Baudouin de Ronsard or Rossart was the founder of the French branch of the house, and made his mark in the early stages of the Hundred Years' War. The poet's father was Louis de Ronsard, and his mother was Jeanne de Chaudrier, who came from a noble and well-connected family. Pierre was the youngest son. Louis de Ronsard was maître d'hôtel du roi to Francis I, whose captivity after Pavia had just been ameliorated by treaty, and who had to leave home shortly after Pierre's birth.

The future poet was educated at home in his earliest years and sent to the Collège de Navarre in Paris at the age of nine. When Madeleine of France married James V of Scotland, Ronsard became a page in the Scottish court, where he became inspired to render French vernacular translations of classical authors. A year after the death of the queen, he returned to France, travelling back through England.

Further travel took him to Flanders, Holland, and again, for a short time, to Scotland, on diplomatic missions with Claude d'Humières, seigneur de Lassigny. He then became secretary to the suite of Lazare de Baïf, the father of his future colleague in the Pléiade and his companion on this occasion, Antoine de Baïf, at the diet of Speyer. Afterwards he joined the entourage of the cardinal du Bellay-Langey; his notorious quarrel with François Rabelais dates from this period.

== Studies ==
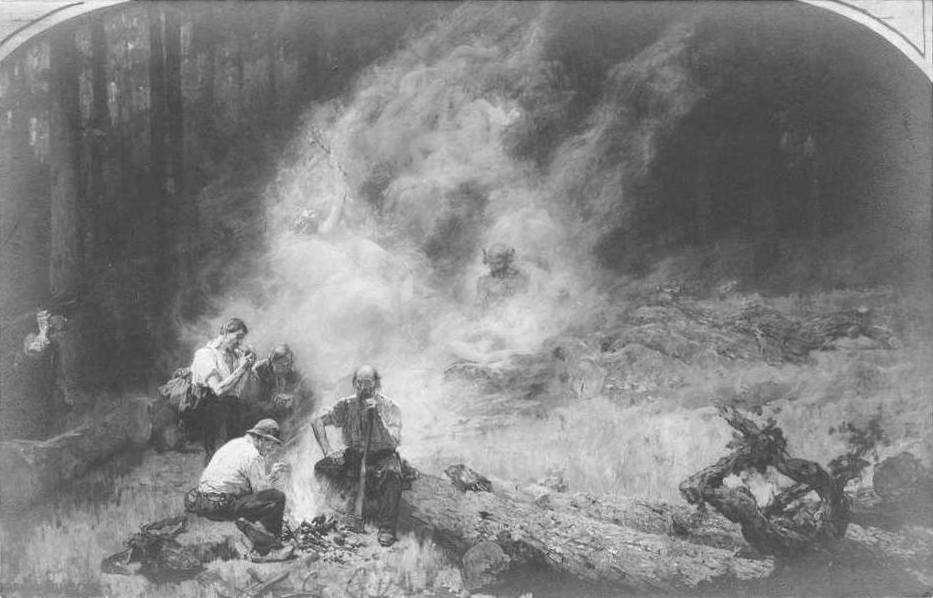
Apparitions in the smoke: Gabriel Guay's Les bourreaux des bois (1909), inspired by Elégies, XXIV, "Contre les bûcherons de la forêt de Gastine."

His diplomatic career was cut short by an attack of deafness following a 1540 visit, as part of legation to Alsace, that no physician could cure; he would subsequently determine to devote himself to study. The institution he chose for the purpose among the numerous schools and colleges of Paris was the Collège Coqueret, the principal of which was Jean Daurat — afterwards the "dark star" (as he has been called from his silence in French) of the Pléiade, and already an acquaintance of Ronsard's from having held the office of tutor in the Baïf household. Antoine de Baïf, Daurat's pupil, accompanied Ronsard; Remy Belleau shortly followed; Joachim du Bellay, the second of the seven, joined not much later. Muretus (Marc Antoine de Muret), a great scholar and by means of his Latin plays a great influence in the creation of French tragedy, was also a student here.

Ronsard's period of study occupied seven years, and the first manifesto of the new literary movement, which was to apply to the vernacular the principles of criticism and scholarship learnt from the classics, came not from him but from Du Bellay. The Défense et illustration de la langue française of the latter appeared in 1549, and the Pléiade (or Brigade, as it was first called) may be said to have been then launched. It consisted, as its name implies, of seven writers whose names are sometimes differently enumerated, though the orthodox canon is beyond doubt composed of Ronsard, Du Bellay, Baïf, Belleau, Pontus de Tyard (a man of rank and position who had exemplified the principles of the friends earlier), Jodelle the dramatist, and Daurat. Ronsard's own work came a little later, and a rather idle story is told of a trick of Du Bellay's which at last determined him to publish. Some single and minor pieces, an epithalamium on Antoine de Bourbon and Jeanne de Navarre (1550), a "Hymne de la France" (1549), an "Ode a la Paix," preceded the publication in 1550 of the four first books ("first" is characteristic and noteworthy) of the Odes of Pierre de Ronsard.

This was followed in 1552 by the publication of his Amours de Cassandre with the fifth book of Odes, dedicated to the 15-year-old Cassandre Salviati, whom he had met at Blois and followed to her father's Château de Talcy. These books excited a violent literary quarrel. Marot was dead, but he left numerous followers, some of whom saw in the stricter literary critique of the Pléiade, in its outspoken contempt of merely vernacular and medieval forms, in its strenuous advice to French poetry to "follow the ancients," and so forth, an insult to the author of the Adolescence Clémentine and his school.

== Fame ==
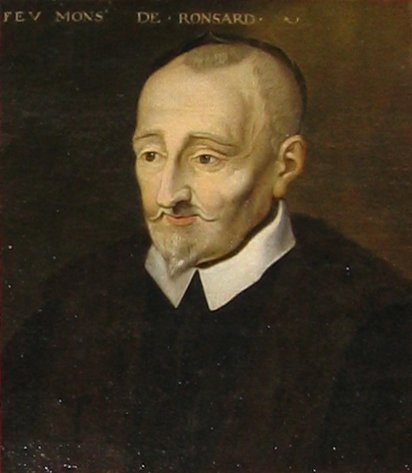
Pierre de Ronsard

His popularity in his own time was overwhelming and immediate, and his prosperity was unbroken. He published his Hymns, dedicated to Margaret de Valois, in 1555; the conclusion of the Amours, addressed to another heroine, in 1556; and then a collection of Œuvres completes, said to be due to the invitation of Mary Stuart, Queen of Francis II, in 1560; with Elégies, mascarades et bergeries in 1565. To this same year belongs his most important and interesting Abrégé de l'art poétique français.

The rapid change of sovereigns did Ronsard no harm. Charles IX, King of France, who succeeded his brother after a very short time, was even better inclined to him than Henry and Francis. He gave him rooms in the palace; he bestowed upon him diverse abbacies and priories; and he called him and regarded him constantly as his master in poetry. Neither was Charles IX a bad poet. This royal patronage, however, had its disagreeable side. It excited violent dislike to Ronsard on the part of the Huguenots, who wrote constant pasquinades against him, strove (by a ridiculous exaggeration of the Dionysiac festival at Arcueil, in which the friends had indulged to celebrate the success of the first French tragedy, Jodelle's Cleopatre) to represent him as a libertine and an atheist, and (which seems to have annoyed him more than anything else) set up his follower Du Bartas as his rival.

According to some words of his own, they were not contented with this variety of argument, but attempted to have him assassinated. During this period, Ronsard began writing the epic poem the Franciade (1572), a work that was never finished and is generally considered a failure due to its versification—a decasyllabic metre of rimes plates that corresponds poorly with the genre of epic poetry. The metre (the decasyllable) could not but contrast unfavourably with the magnificent alexandrines that Du Bartas and Agrippa d'Aubigné were shortly to produce; the general plan is feebly classical, and the very language has little or nothing of that racy mixture of scholarliness and love of natural beauty which distinguishes the best work of the Pléiade. The poem could never have had an abiding success, but at its appearance it had the singular bad luck almost to coincide with the massacre of St Bartholomew, which had occurred about a fortnight before its publication. One party in the state were certain to look coldly on the work of a minion of the court at such a juncture, the other had something else to think of.

The death of Charles made little difference in the court favour that Ronsard enjoyed, but, combined with his increasing infirmities, it seems to have determined him to quit court life. During his last days he lived chiefly at a house which he possessed in Vendôme, the capital of his native province, at his abbey at Croix-Val in the same neighbourhood, or else at Paris, where he was usually the guest of Jean Galland, well known as a scholar, at the College de Boncourt. It seems also that he had a town house of his own in the Faubourg Saint-Marcel. At any rate his preferments put him in perfectly easy circumstances, and he seems neither to have derived nor wished for any profit from his books. A half-jocular suggestion that his publishers should give him money to buy "du bois pour se chauffer" in return for his last revision of his Œuvres complètes is the only trace of any desire of the kind. On the other hand, he received not merely gifts and endowments from his own sovereign but presents from many others, including Elizabeth I of England. Mary, Queen of Scots addressed him from her prison, and Tasso consulted him on the Gerusalemme.

== Final years ==
His last years were saddened not merely by the death of many of his closest friends, but by increasing ill health, though he continued his literary work. Towards the end of 1585 his health deteriorated, and he seems to have moved restlessly from one of his houses to another for some months. He died at the priory of Saint-Cosme in Touraine, and was buried at the church on Friday, 27 December 1585.

== Works ==
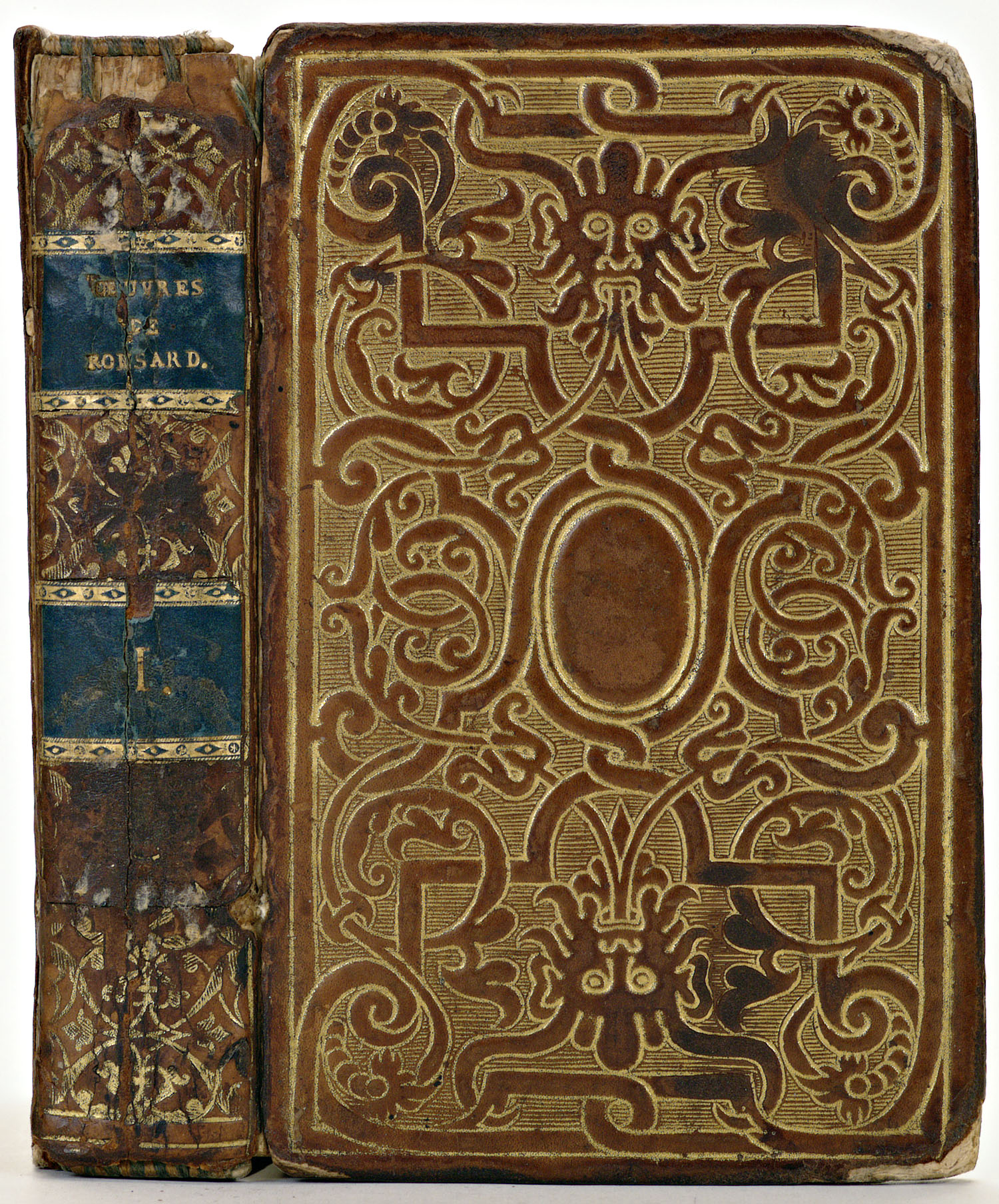
A 1571 book of Ronsard's works

The character and fortunes of Ronsard's works are part of literary history, and supply in themselves a kind of illustration of the progress of French literature during the last three centuries. At first, as has been said, the enmity, not altogether unprovoked, of the friends and followers of Marot fell to his lot, then the still fiercer antagonism of the Huguenot faction, who, happening to possess a poet of great merit in Du Bartas, were able to attack Ronsard at his tenderest point. But fate had by no means done its worst with him in his lifetime. After his death the classical reaction set in under the auspices of Malherbe, who seems to have been animated with a sort of personal hatred of Ronsard, though it is not clear that they ever met. After Malherbe, the rising glory of Corneille and his contemporaries obscured the tentative and unequal work of the Pléiade, which was, moreover, directly attacked by Boileau himself, the dictator of French criticism in the last half of the 17th century.

Then Ronsard was, except by a few men of taste, such as Jean de La Bruyère and Fénelon, forgotten when he was not sneered at. In this condition he remained during the whole of the 18th century and the first quarter of the 19th. The Romantic revival, seeing in him a victim of its special bête noire Boileau, and attracted by his splendid diction, rich metrical faculty, and combination of classical and medieval peculiarities, adopted his name as a kind of battle-cry, and for a time somewhat exaggerated his merits. The critical work of Sainte-Beuve in his Tableau de la littérature française au 16ème siècle, and later of other authors, has established Ronsard's reputation.

Ronsard was the acknowledged chief of the Pléiade and its most voluminous poet.

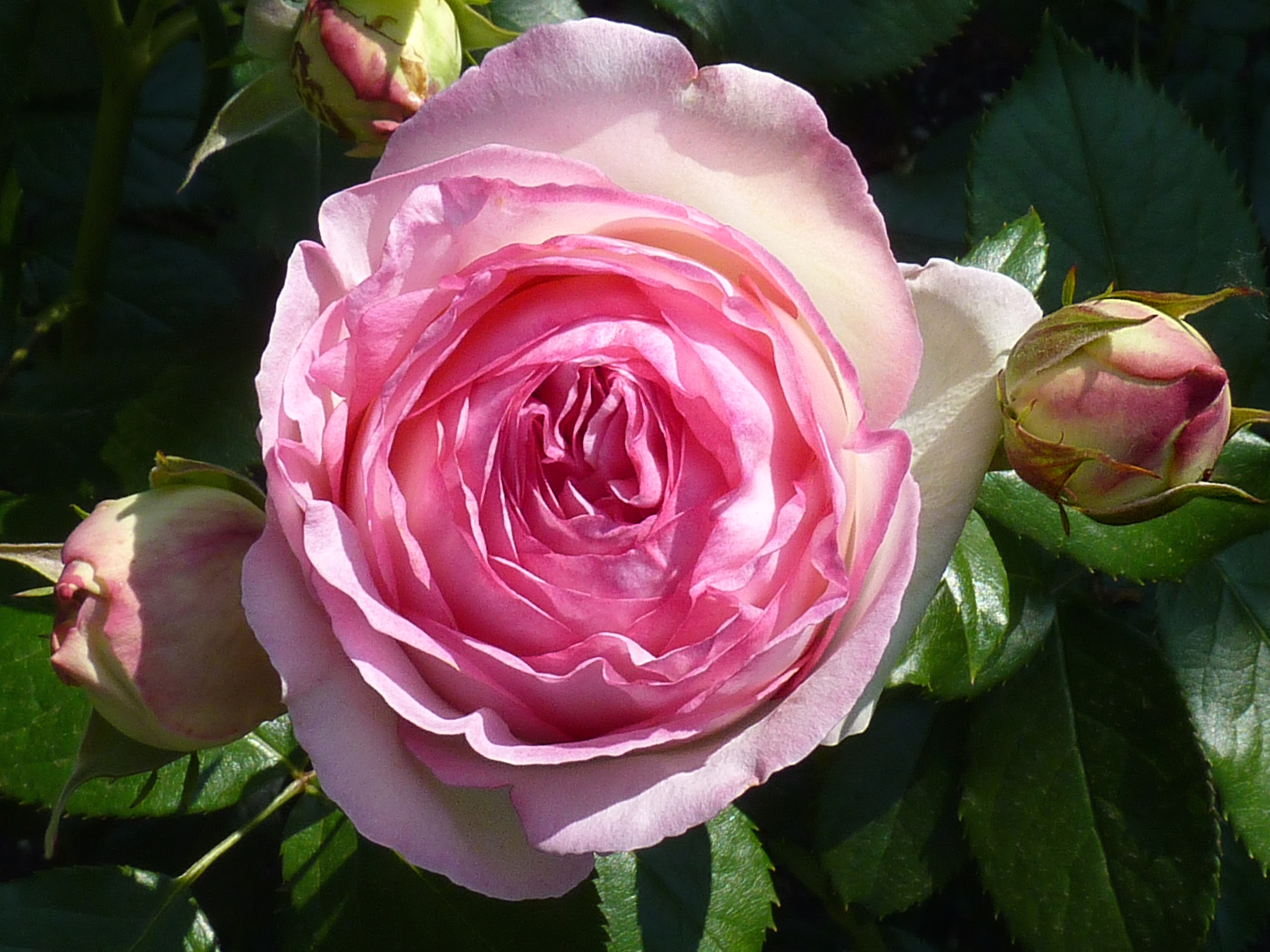
Rose cultivar 'Pierre de Ronsard', named in reference to Ronsard's poem Ode à Cassandre (Mignonne, allons voir si la rose...)

His many odes have been studied. He began by imitating the strophic arrangement of the ancients, but very soon deserted this for a kind of adjustment of the Horatian ode to rhyme, instead of exact quantitative metre. In this latter kind he devised some melodious rhythms which have not been widely used since the 17th century. His more sustained work sometimes displays a bad selection of measure; his occasional poetry — epistles, eclogues, elegies, etc. — is tarnished by its vast volume. In general, Ronsard is considered best in his amatory verse (the long series of sonnets and odes to Cassandre, Pikles, Marie, Genèvre, Hélène—Hélène de Surgères, a later and mainly "literary" love—etc.), and in his descriptions of the country (the "Ode à Cassandre," the "Fontaine Bellerie," the "Forêt de Gastine," and so forth). He used the graceful diminutives which his school set in fashion. He knew well too how to manage adjectives ("marbrine," "cinabrine," "ivoirine" and the like) which were another fancy of the Pléiade.

== Bibliography ==
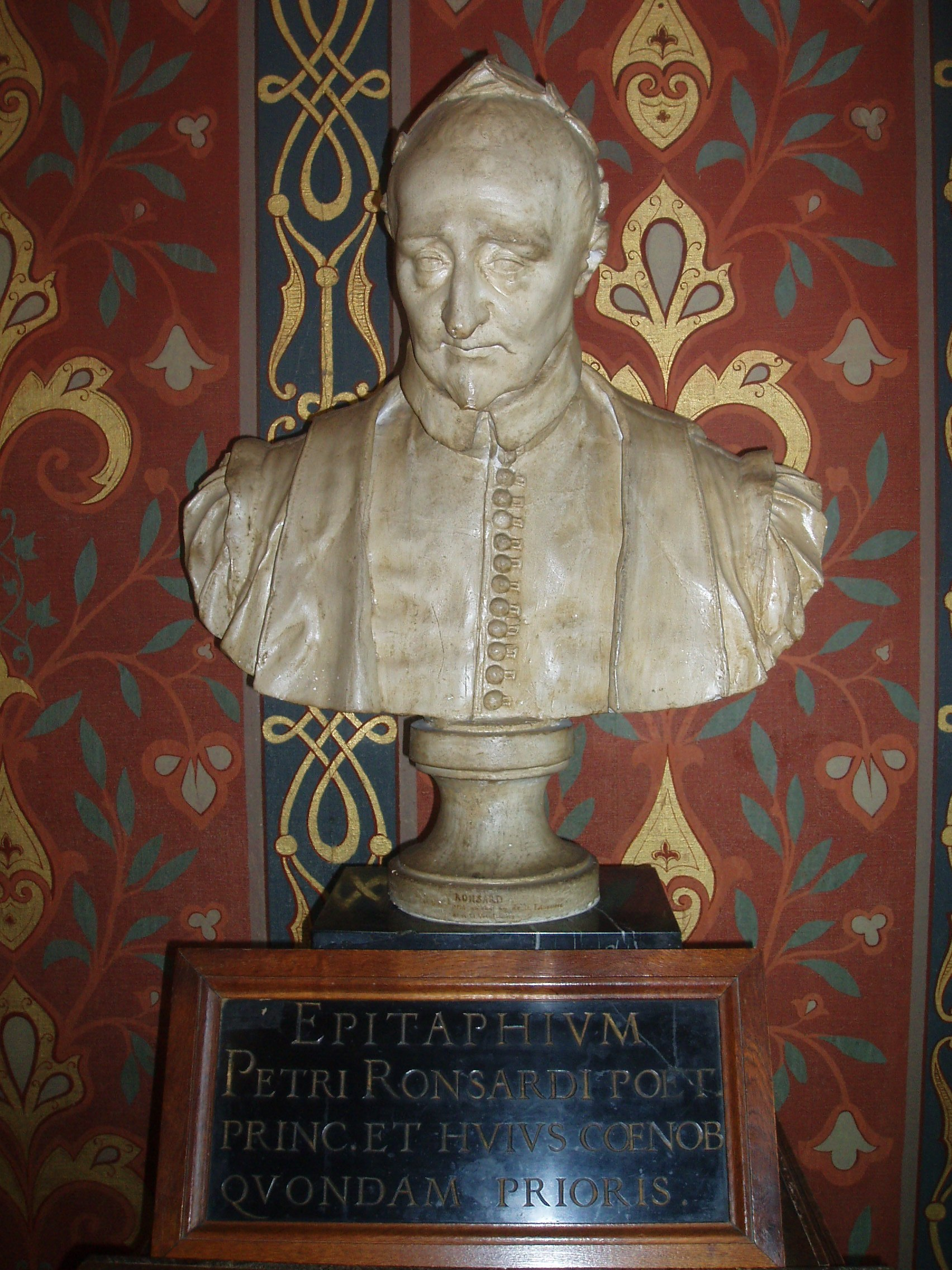
Bust and inscription of Pierre de Ronsard at the Château de Blois.

The chief separately-published works of Ronsard are noted above. However, during his life he produced a vast number of separate publications, some of them mere pamphlets or broadsheets, which from time to time he collected, often striking out others at the same time, in the successive editions of his works. Of these he himself published seven - the first in 1560, the last in 1584. Between his death and the year 1630 ten more complete editions were published, the most famous of which is the folio of 1609. A copy of this presented by Sainte-Beuve to Victor Hugo, and later in the possession of Maxime du Camp, has a place of its own in French literary history. The work of Claude Binet in 1586, Discours de la vie de Pierre de Ronsard, is very important for early information, and the author seems to have revised some of Ronsard's work under the poet's own direction.

From 1630 Ronsard was not again reprinted for more than two centuries. Yet just before the close of the second Sainte-Beuve printed a selection of his poems to accompany the above-mentioned Tableau (1828). There are also selections, Choix de poésies - publiées par A. Noël (in the Collection Didot) and Becq de Fouquières. In 1857 Prosper Blanchemain, who had previously published a volume of Œuvres inédites de Ronsard, undertook a complete edition for the Bibliothèque Elzévirienne, in eight volumes. It is practically complete; a few pieces of a somewhat free character which are ascribed with some certainty to the poet are, however, excluded. A later and better edition still is that of Marty-Laveaux (1887–1893), and another that of Benjamin Pifteau (1891).
