= Joachim du Bellay =

French poet and critic (died 1560)

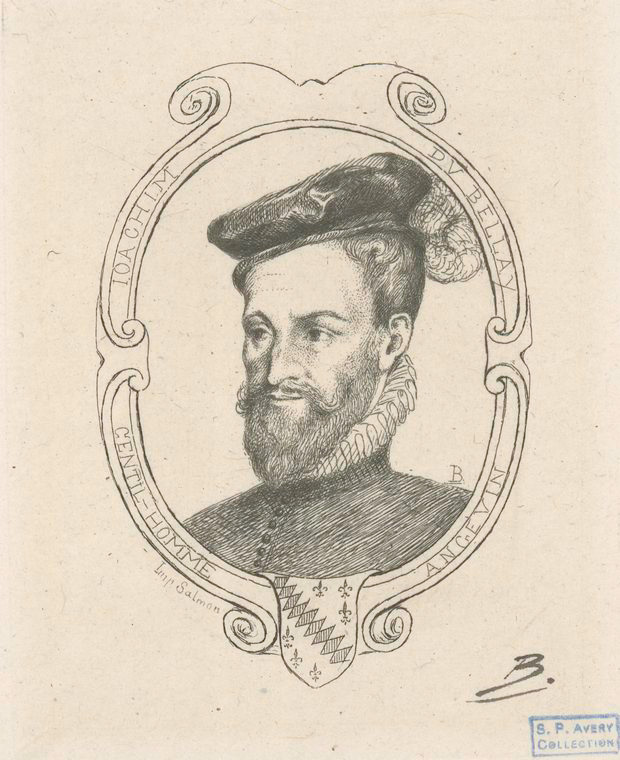
- Born: c. 1522; Liré, Anjou, France
- Died: 1 January 1560 (aged 37–38); Paris, France
- Occupation: Poet
- Writing career
- Period: 16th century
- Genre: Poetry
- Notable work: Les Regrets
- Movements: French Renaissance, Petrarchism

Joachim du Bellay (Note: Also spelled Du Bellay, with a capital D.) (French: [ʒɔaʃɛ̃ dy bɛlɛ]; c. 1522 – 1 January 1560) was a French poet, critic, and a founder of La Pléiade. He notably wrote the manifesto of the group: Défense et illustration de la langue française, which aimed at promoting French as an artistic language, equal to Greek and Latin.

== Biography ==
Joachim du Bellay was born at the Castle of La Turmelière, not far from Liré, near Angers, being the son of Jean du Bellay, Lord of Gonnor, first cousin of the cardinal Jean du Bellay and of Guillaume du Bellay. His mother was Renée Chabot, daughter of Perceval Chabot and heiress of La Turmelière (Plus me plaît le séjour qu'ont bâti mes aïeux).

Both his parents died while he was still a child, and he was left to the guardianship of his elder brother, René du Bellay, who neglected his education, leaving him to run wild at La Turmelière. When he was twenty-three, however, he received permission to study law at the University of Poitiers, no doubt with a view to his obtaining preferment through his kinsman the Cardinal Jean du Bellay. At Poitiers he came in contact with the humanist Marc Antoine Muret, and with Jean Salmon Macrin (1490–1557), a Latin poet famous in his day. There too he probably met Jacques Peletier du Mans, who had published a translation of the Ars Poetica of Horace, with a preface in which much of the program advocated later by La Pléiade is to be found in outline.

It was probably in 1547 that du Bellay met Ronsard in an inn on the way to Poitiers, an event which may justly be regarded as the starting-point of the French school of Renaissance poetry. The two had much in common, and became fast friends. Du Bellay returned with Ronsard to Paris to join the circle of students of the humanities attached to Jean Dorat at the Collège de Coqueret.

While Ronsard and Jean-Antoine de Baïf were most influenced by Greek models, du Bellay was more especially a Latinist, and perhaps his preference for a language so nearly connected with his own had some part in determining the more national and familiar note of his poetry. In 1548 appeared the Art poétique of Thomas Sébillet, who enunciated many of the ideas that Ronsard and his followers had at heart, though with essential differences in the point of view, since he held up as models Clément Marot and his disciples. Ronsard and his friends dissented violently from Sébillet on this and other points, and they doubtless felt a natural resentment at finding their ideas forestalled and, moreover, inadequately presented.

The famous manifesto of the Pléiade, the Défense et illustration de la langue française (Defense and Illustration of the French Language, 1549), was at once a complement and a refutation of Sébillet's treatise. This book (inspired in part by Sperone Speroni's Dialogo delle lingue, 1542) was the expression of the literary principles of the Pléiade as a whole, but although Ronsard was the chosen leader, its redaction was entrusted to du Bellay. This work also bolstered French political debate as a means of learned men to reform their country. To obtain a clear view of the reforms aimed at by the Pléiade, the Defence should be further considered in connection with Ronsard's Abrégé d'art poétique and his preface to the Franciade. Du Bellay maintained that the French language as it was then constituted was too poor to serve as a medium for the higher forms of poetry, but he contended that by proper cultivation it might be brought on a level with the classical tongues. He condemned those who despaired of their mother tongue, and used Latin for their more serious and ambitious work. For translations from the ancients he would substitute imitations, though he does not in the Defense explain precisely how one is to go about this. Not only were the forms of classical poetry to be imitated, but a separate poetic language and style, distinct from those employed in prose, were to be used. The French language was to be enriched by a development of its internal resources and by discreet borrowing from Italian, Latin and Greek. Both du Bellay and Ronsard laid stress on the necessity of prudence in these borrowings, and both repudiated the charge of wishing to Latinize their mother tongue. The book was a spirited defence of poetry and of the possibilities of the French language; it was also a declaration of war on those writers who held less heroic views.

The violent attacks made by du Bellay on Marot and his followers, and on Sébillet, did not go unanswered. Sébillet replied in the preface to his translation of the Iphigenia of Euripides; Guillaume des Autels, a Lyonnese poet, reproached du Bellay with ingratitude to his predecessors, and showed the weakness of his argument for imitation as opposed to translation in a digression in his Réplique aux furieuses defenses de Louis Meigret (Lyons, 1550); Barthélemy Aneau, regent of the Collège de la Trinité at Lyons, attacked him in his Quintil Horatian (Lyons, 1551), the authorship of which was commonly attributed to Charles Fontaine. Aneau pointed out the obvious inconsistency of inculcating imitation of the ancients and depreciating native poets in a work professing to be a defence of the French language.

Du Bellay replied to his various assailants in a preface to the second edition (1550) of his sonnet sequence Olive, with which he also published two polemical poems, the Musagnaeomachie, and an ode addressed to Ronsard, Contre les envieux fioles. Olive, a collection of sonnets modeled after the poetry of Petrarch, Ariosto, and contemporary Italians published by Gabriele Giolito de' Ferrari, first appeared in 1549. With it were printed thirteen odes entitled Vers lyriques. Olive has been supposed to be an anagram for the name of a Mlle Viole, but there is little evidence of real passion in the poems, and they may perhaps be regarded as a Petrarchan exercise, especially as, in the second edition, the dedication to his lady is exchanged for one to Marguerite de Valois, sister of Henry II. Du Bellay did not actually introduce the sonnet into French poetry, but he acclimatized it; and when the fashion of sonneteering became a mania he was one of the first to ridicule its excesses.

About this time du Bellay had a serious illness of two years' duration, from which dates the beginning of his deafness. He had further anxieties in the guardianship of his nephew. The boy died in 1553, and Joachim, who had up to this time borne the title of sieur de Liré, became seigneur of Gonnor. In 1549 he had published a Recueil de poésies dedicated to the Princess Marguerite. This was followed in 1552 by a version of the fourth book of the Aeneid, with other translations and some occasional poems.

In the next year he went to Rome as one of the secretaries of Cardinal du Bellay. To the beginning of his four and a half years' residence in Italy belong the forty-seven sonnets of his Antiquités de Rome, published in 1558. Sonnet III of the Antiquités, "Nouveau venu qui cherches Rome en Rome," has been shown to reflect the direct influence of a Latin poem by a Renaissance writer named Jean or Janis Vitalis. The Antiquités were rendered into English by Edmund Spenser (The Ruins of Rome, 1591), and the sonnet "Nouveau venu qui cherches Rome en Rome" was rendered into Spanish by Francisco de Quevedo ("A Roma sepultada en sus ruinas," 1650). These sonnets were more personal and less imitative than the Olive sequence, and struck a note which was revived in later French literature by Volney and Chateaubriand. His stay in Rome was, however, a real exile. His duties were those of an attendant. He had to meet the cardinal's creditors and to find money for the expenses of the household. Nevertheless, he found many friends among Italian scholars, and formed a close friendship with another exiled poet whose circumstances were similar to his own, Olivier de Magny.

Towards the end of his sojourn in Rome he fell violently in love with a Roman lady called Faustine, who appears in his poetry as Columba and Columbelle. This passion finds its clearest expression in the Latin poems. Faustine was guarded by an old and jealous husband, and du Bellay's eventual conquest may have had something to do with his departure for Paris at the end of August 1557. In the next year he published the poems he had brought back with him from Rome, the Latin Poemata, the Antiquités de Rome, the Divers Jeux Rustiques, and the 191 sonnets of the Regrets, the greater number of which were written in Italy. The Regrets show that he had moved away from the theories of the Défence.

The simplicity and tenderness specially characteristic of du Bellay appear in the sonnets telling of his unlucky passion for Faustine, and of his nostalgia for the banks of the Loire. Among them are some satirical sonnets describing Roman manners, and the later ones written after his return to Paris are often appeals for patronage. His intimate relations with Ronsard were not renewed, but he formed a close friendship with the scholar Jean de Morel, whose house was the centre of a learned society. In 1559 du Bellay published at Poitiers La Nouvelle Manière de faire son profit des lettres, a satirical epistle translated from the Latin of Adrien Turnèbe, and with it Le Poète courtisan, which introduced the formal satire into French poetry. The Nouvelle Manière is believed to be directed at Pierre de Paschal, who was elected as royal historiographer, and who had promised to write Latin biographies of the great, but who in fact never wrote anything of the sort. Both works were published under the pseudonym of J Quintil du Troussay, and the courtier-poet was generally supposed to be Mellin de Saint-Gelais, with whom du Bellay had always, however, been on friendly terms.

== Last works and death ==
A long and eloquent Discours au roi (detailing the duties of a prince, and translated from a Latin original written by Michel de l'Hôpital, now lost) was dedicated to Francis II in 1559, and is said to have secured for the poet a tardy pension, although it was not published until 1567, after his death. In Paris he was still in the employ of the cardinal, who delegated to him the lay patronage which he still retained in the diocese. In the exercise of these functions Joachim quarrelled with Eustache du Bellay, bishop of Paris, who prejudiced his relations with the cardinal, less cordial since the publication of the outspoken Regrets. His chief patron, Marguerite de Valois, to whom he was sincerely attached, had gone to Savoy. Du Bellay's health was weak; his deafness seriously hindered his official duties; and on 1 January 1560 he died at the age of 38. There is no evidence that he was in priest's orders, but he was a clerk, and as such held various preferments. He had at one time been a canon of Notre Dame of Paris, and was accordingly buried in the cathedral. The statement that he was nominated archbishop of Bordeaux during the last year of life is unauthenticated by documentary evidence and is in itself extremely improbable.

His remains were reportedly identified in 2024 in a lead coffin found in April 2022 during excavations carried out by the National Institute for Preventive Archaeological Research (Inrap) after the Cathedral fire in 2019. Traces of bone tuberculosis and chronic meningitis found on the skeleton, of which the poet showed symptoms in the last years of his life, leave little doubt as to the identity of the deceased, according to Éric Crubézy, a doctor and professor of anthropology at the Toulouse III - Paul Sabatier University. Nevertheless, isotope analysis of the skeleton has contradicted this conclusion, as it suggests the remains belonged to a person from the west of France, while du Bellay grew up in the east. Some of the excavators think the remains are in fact that of 16th century French knight Édouard de la Madeleine.

== Bibliography ==
The best edition of his collected works in French is still that produced by Henri Chamard in six volumes. Also, there are the Œuvres francaises (2 vols., 1866–1867), edited with introduction and notes by C. Marty-Laveaux in his Pléiade française. His Œuvres choisies were published by L. Becq de Fouquières in 1876. The chief source of his biography is his own poetry, especially the Latin elegy addressed to Jean de Morel, "Elegia ad Janum Morellum Ebredunensem, Pytadem suum," printed with a volume of Xenia (Paris, 1569). A study of his life and writings by H. Chamard, forming vol. viii. of the Travaux et mémoires de l'université de Lille (Lute, 1900), contains all the available information and corrects many common errors.
