= Ruillé-sur-Loir =

- Part of Loir en Vallée
- Location of Ruillé-sur-Loir
- Location within France Location within Pays de la Loire
- Coordinates: 47°45′13″N 0°37′13″E
- Country: France
- Region: Pays de la Loire
- Department: Sarthe
- Arrondissement: La Flèche
- Canton: Montval-sur-Loir
- Commune: Loir en Vallée
- Area^{1}: 39.48 km^{2} (15.24 sq mi)
- Population (2022): 1,118
  - Density: 28.32/km^{2} (73.34/sq mi)
- Demonym(s): Ruillacois, Ruillacoise
- Time zone: UTC+01:00 (CET)
  - Summer (DST): UTC+02:00 (CEST)
- Postal code: 72340
- ^{1} French Land Register data, which excludes lakes, ponds, glaciers > 1 km^{2} (0.386 sq mi or 247 acres) and river estuaries.

Ruillé-sur-Loir (French pronunciation: [ʁɥije syʁ lwaʁ], literally Ruillé on Loir) is a former commune in the Sarthe department in the Pays de la Loire region in north-western France. On 1 January 2017, it was merged into the new commune Loir en Vallée.

The village has a medieval and Renaissance parish church but is dominated by the school and the mother house of the order of Sisters of Providence (which enjoys links with England, the Netherlands and Madagascar). The tall spire of the conventual church is visible at a distance.

It was the first home to the Brothers of St. Joseph, now the Holy Cross Brothers associated with Notre Dame University in the USA.

== See also ==
- Communes of the Sarthe department
