= Allegory of Painting =

Allegory of Painting may refer to:

- Allegory of Painting (Le Mans), 1640s
- Self-Portrait as the Allegory of Painting by Gentileschi, 1638–39
- Allegory of Painting and Sculpture by Guercino, 1637
- Allegory of Painting (van Mieris) by Frans van Mieris the Elder, 1661
- The Art of Painting, also known as the Allegory of Painting, by Johannes Vermeer, c. 1666–1668
