= Musée de Tessé =

Museum in Le Mans, France

Coordinates: 48°00′37″N 0°12′12″E

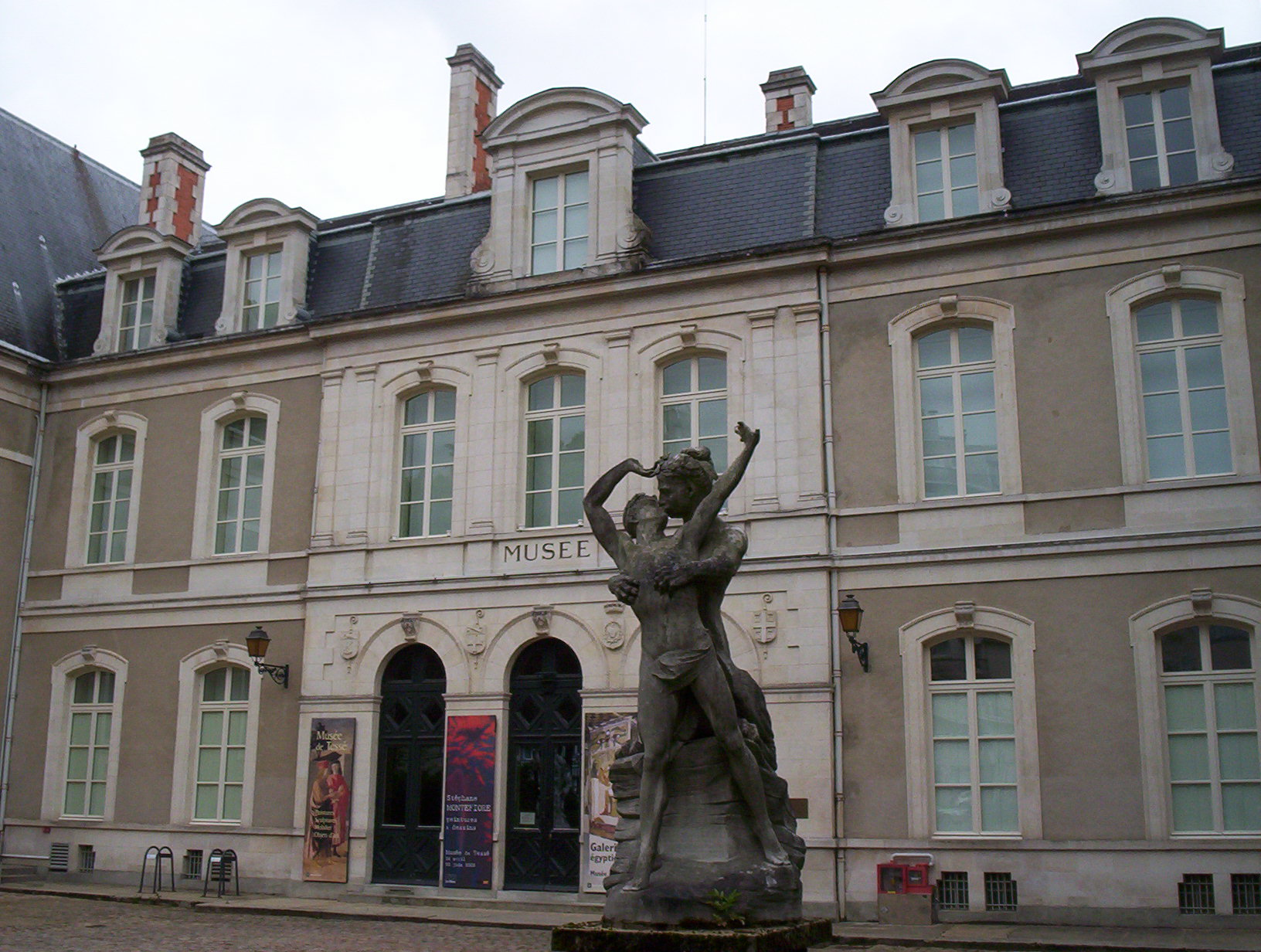
Musée de Tessé

The Musée de Tessé is the central museum of fine arts for the city of Le Mans in France. It is located on the edge of the Quinconces des Jacobins and the Parc de Tessé.

It is housed in a former episcopal palace built on the site of the former hôtel particulier of René de Froulay, Count of Tessé. It has a major ancient Egyptian collection, with basement rooms housing reconstructions of the burial chambers of Nefertari (wife of Rameses II) and of Sennefer, 'mayor' of Thebes, both thanks to a donation of photographs from the Kodak-Pathé Foundation.

It also housed the city's local archaeological collections until 2009, when these were moved to the Museum of Archaeology and History of Le Mans.

== Curators ==
Le Mans' first prefect, Louis-Marie Auvray, decided to ask the naturalist Louis Maulny to catalogue the works. Maulny had to work with the new curé constitutionnel of the Le Pré parish, André-Pierre Le Dru, who had been made the museum's curator on 5 February 1793. Maulny was considered as a major figure in Le Mans' art scene, since he had identified the Plantagenet Enamel, an enamel plaque from Geoffrey V of Anjou's tomb. He managed to preserve the work, which could have been burned or melted down by revolutionaries.

Maulny produced a first catalogue of the two hundred paintings in the collection. When the libraries were suppressed on 28 January 1803, the two curators' work was entrusted to Pierre Renouard, a former priest. He tested the solidity of the saints' relics from Solesmes by sawing them and placing them in a den. In 1816, thanks to buying Maulny's collection, the museum was renamed the Museum and Cabinet of Natural History. Renouard was thus dismissed, notably for damaging and destroying several works.

In 1816 an engineer, Jean-Antoine Daudin, was put in charge of both the natural history and fine arts collections. In 1822 they were made the property of the town council. Daudin died at 84 in 1832, leaving the collection in disorder, though he was recognised and appreciated in his own time and was also appointed president of Le Mans's society of arts and inspector of the town's antiquities.

On 17 January 1834 Daudin's replacement Narcisse Desportes started work. He died in 1856 without really having made any innovations at the museum, being satisifed with administrative work. He seems to have acquired no new works or event to attend to the museum's material needs. He was succeeded by his painter nephew Charles Dugasseau, who was not interested in scientific works. He managed to acquire a collection of 'Italian Primitive' works, based on the collection of Evariste Fouret, which he only acquired with great difficulty. After him several painters produced works specifically for the museum or were commissioned by it. Louis Basse (Le Mans' mayor for nine years) surrounded himself with the librarian Anjubault, the theologian-archaeologist Tournesac and Gustave Etoc-Demazy, a physician and psychiatrist. From 1885 to 1888 Delaunay then Veron-Faré took up the post.

From 22 October 1890 the painter Henri Vallée began a thirty-year stint as head of the museum. Over the years the collections expanded, but the lack of a naturalist to curate the natural history collections was badly felt. When a new collection arrived it was sent to the Hôtel Coindron. Poor storage and major insect damage eventually led to that whole collection being burned. The Minister of Fine Arts personally appointed Louis Monziès, a drawing teacher at the Collège Sainte-Croix, as curator. The last painter-curator was Arsène Le Feuvre (1932-1936), best known for the famous publicity for Cadum soaps, all dating to 1912. At the same time as accepting the role as curator, he left the office of mayor of Le Mans empty. He was replaced by Félix Geneslay.

== History ==
=== Forming the collection ===
The idea of setting up a town museum first arose towards the end of Louis XVI's reign, just before the French Revolution. Le Mans was one of the first towns in France to get a museum, opening on 21 June 1799 and free to the public, though its official foundation date was 1 September 1801. It was housed in the galleries of the former Abbey of Saint-Pierre de la Couture, which now houses the Sarthe prefecture.

A decree on the seizure of clergy goods in 1789 was brought fully into effect from 1792 onwards. Private collections were confiscated in a number of places in the town and in the Maine region. Most of the museum's collection was originally in that of the maréchal de Tessé, whose descendent René Mans de Froulay de Tessé fled to Switzerland in 1790. Almost 400 works were seized in this way. In Le Mans itself Saint-Vincent Abbey and the church of Notre-Dame de la Couture were pillaged. The operation was swift, under the leadership of François-Yves Besnard, president of the directory for Sarthe and a former curé constitutionnel. Several works were also seized from religious buildings in the town, such as silverware from Saint-Pierre-la-Cour and the paintings from Saint-Vincent Abbey. However, some objects also disappeared forever.

Also on 21 June 1799 a library opened in the Abbey of Saint-Pierre de la Couture, housing works from different regions in western France, particularly those in Angers and throughout Anjou, mainly from Maine, and some from eastern Brittany. On 28 November the same year the town received sixteen paintings for its collection, including:

- Philippe de Champaigne:
  - The Adoration of the Magi, oil on panel, 1.9 x 1.22 m, c.1628
  - Elijah's Dream, oil on canvas, 1.82 x 2.08 m, c.1655
- Attributed to Eustache le Sueur, Cincinnatus Leaves his Plough and Cincinnatus Returns to his Plough, oil on canvas, each 1.3 x 0.98 m, mis 17th century
- Laurent de la Hyre, Christ at Gethsemane, oil on canvas, 1.25 x 1.61 m, c. 1627.
- Jean-Baptiste Jouvenet, The Presentation in the Temple, oil on canvas, 2.3 x 1.5 m, c. 1685.
- Noel Coypel, Amalthea and the Cornucopia, oil on canvas, 1.05 x 2.08 m, c. 1688.
- After Bartoloméo Manfredi, Christ Crowned with Thorns, oil on canvas, 1.57 x 2.33 m.
- Theodoor Van Thulden, Pentecost, oil on canvas, 2.95 x 1.95 m, 1647-1648.
- Jean Restout, Abraham and the Angels, oil on canvas, 2.8 x 1.9 m, c. 1736.
- Carle Van Loo, Christ Washes the Disciples' Feet, oil on canvas, 1.58 x 2.48 m, c. 1742.
- Simon Julien, The Sacrifice of Manoah, oil on canvas, 1.46 x 1.15 m, c. 1760.
- Carle Vernet, David and Abigail, oil on canvas, 1.13 x 1.45 m, 1779.
- Etienne-Barthélémy Garnier, Nebuchadnezzar Kills Zedekiah's Sons in their Father's Presence, oil on canvas, 1.46 x 1.13 m, 1787.
- Johannes-Bernadus Duvivier, Horace Killing his Sister Camilla, oil on canvas, 1.13 x 1.46 m, 1785.

In 1822 Édouard de Montulé donated the ancient Egyptian objects he had collected on a trip along the Nile to the museum.

=== 1846-present ===
In 1846 the town's archaeological museum was formed, with support from Arcisse de Caumont, founder of the Société Française pour la Conservation des Monuments. The town council also bought the 15th-century houses known as the 'maisons de la Reine Bérangère', hoping to use them to house a museum of "the culture of Maine" - they were later turned into a museum. The ancient Egyptian collection was expanded by purchasing François Liger's collection in 1913.

In 1927 the museum of fine arts was moved into the former concordat episcopal residence built in 1848 on the site of the former hôtel of the Tessé family, then destroyed following a fire, then rebuilt in 1872-1876. It was then decommissioned thanks to the law of 1906. The archaeological museum was suppressed in 1940 and most of its works sent to the stores of the musée de Tessé or the displays of the musée d'Allonnes.

The musée de Tessé reopened to the public in 1949, though redevelopment work lasted until 1963. Other redevelopment was also carried out, notably at the end of the 1980s. The ancient Egyptian collection rose to 250 objects thanks to new purchases. In 2001 a 600 square metre ancient Egyptian gallery in the basement opened - it was rebuilt in 2016 with help from Egyptologists and a loan from the Department of Egyptian Antiquities of the Louvre. Local medieval works have been displayed at the Le Mans Archaeological and Historical Museum since 2009.

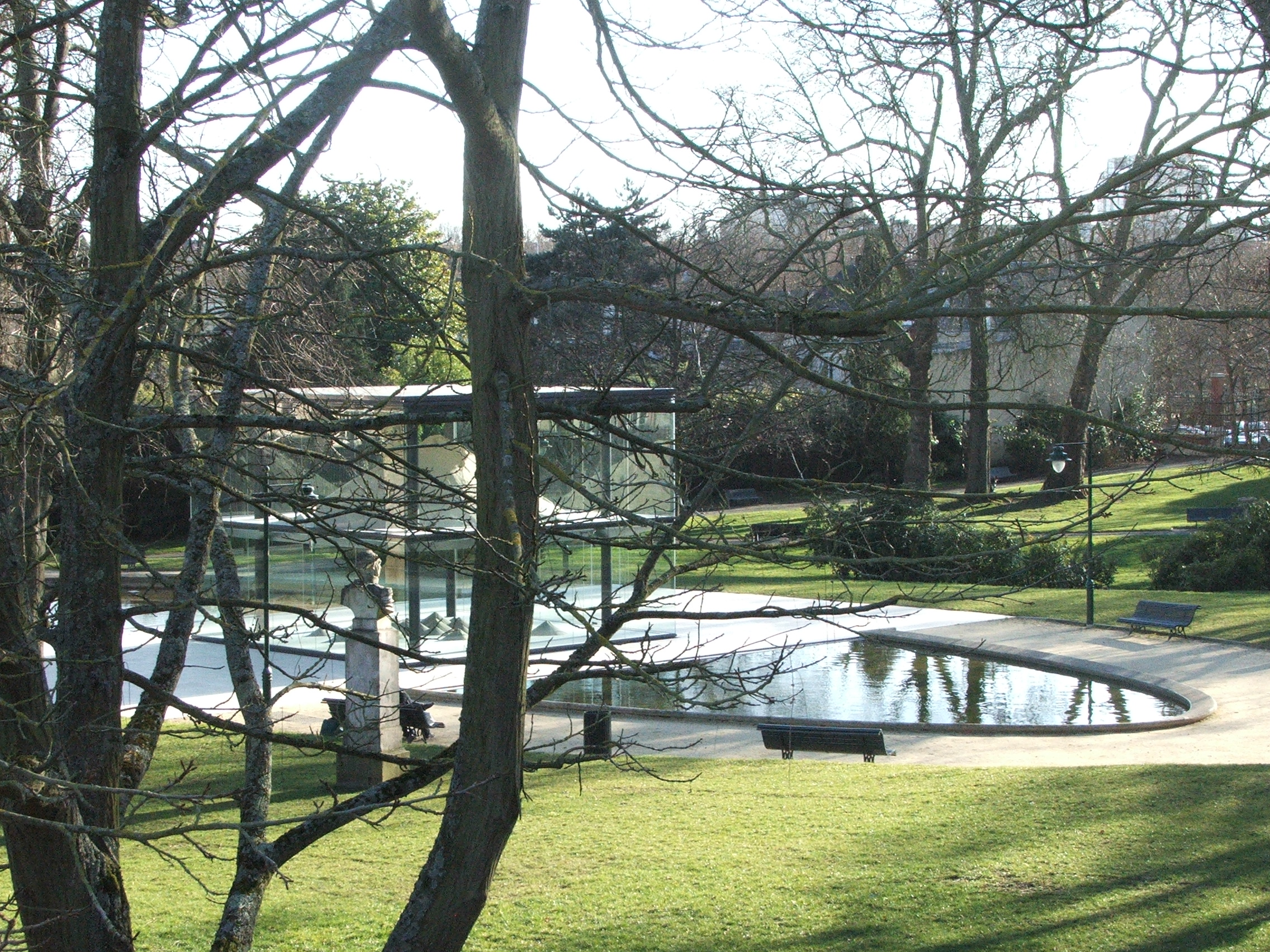
View of the parc de Tessé.

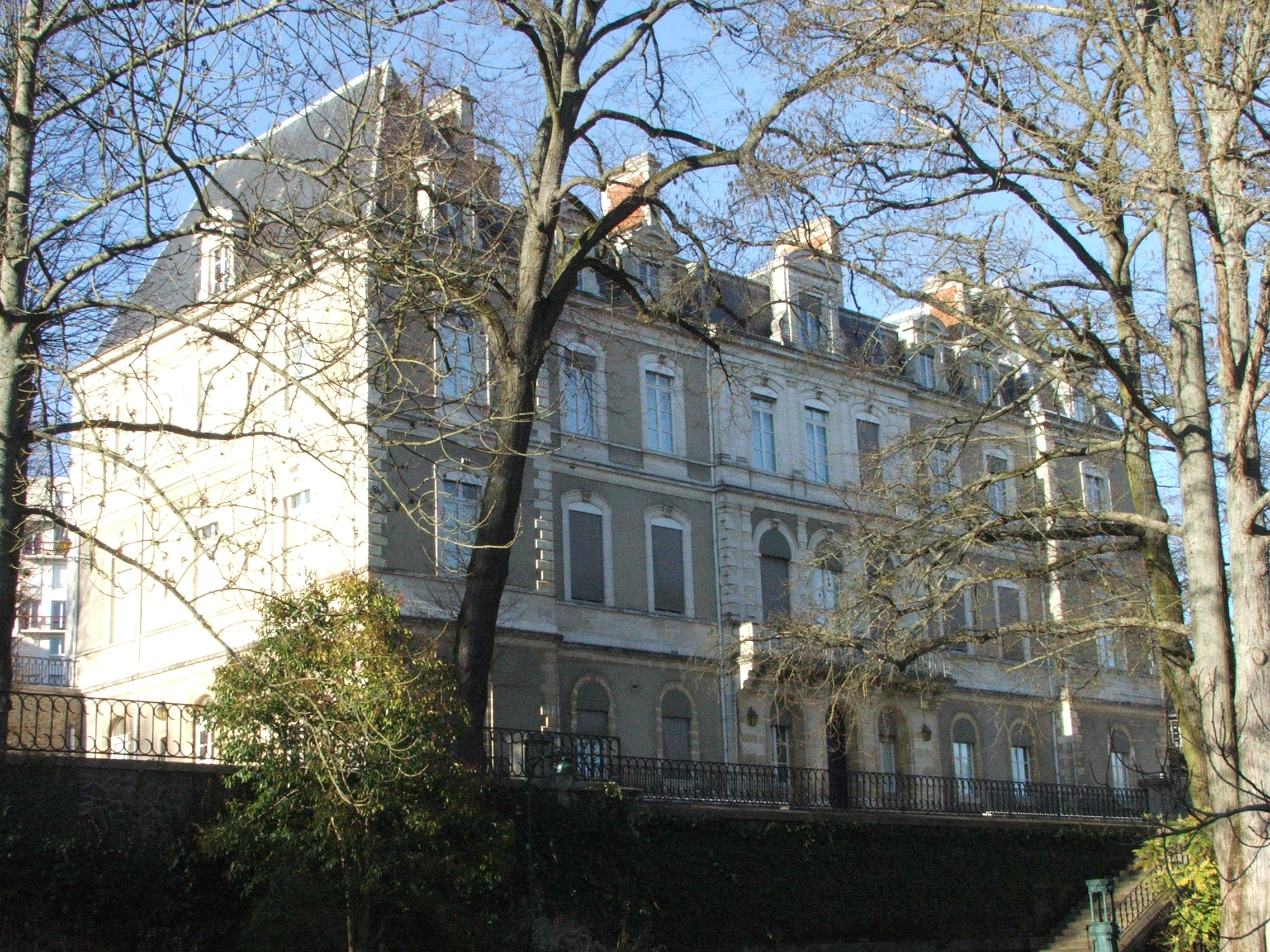
The museum from the park.

== The Tessé Gallery ==
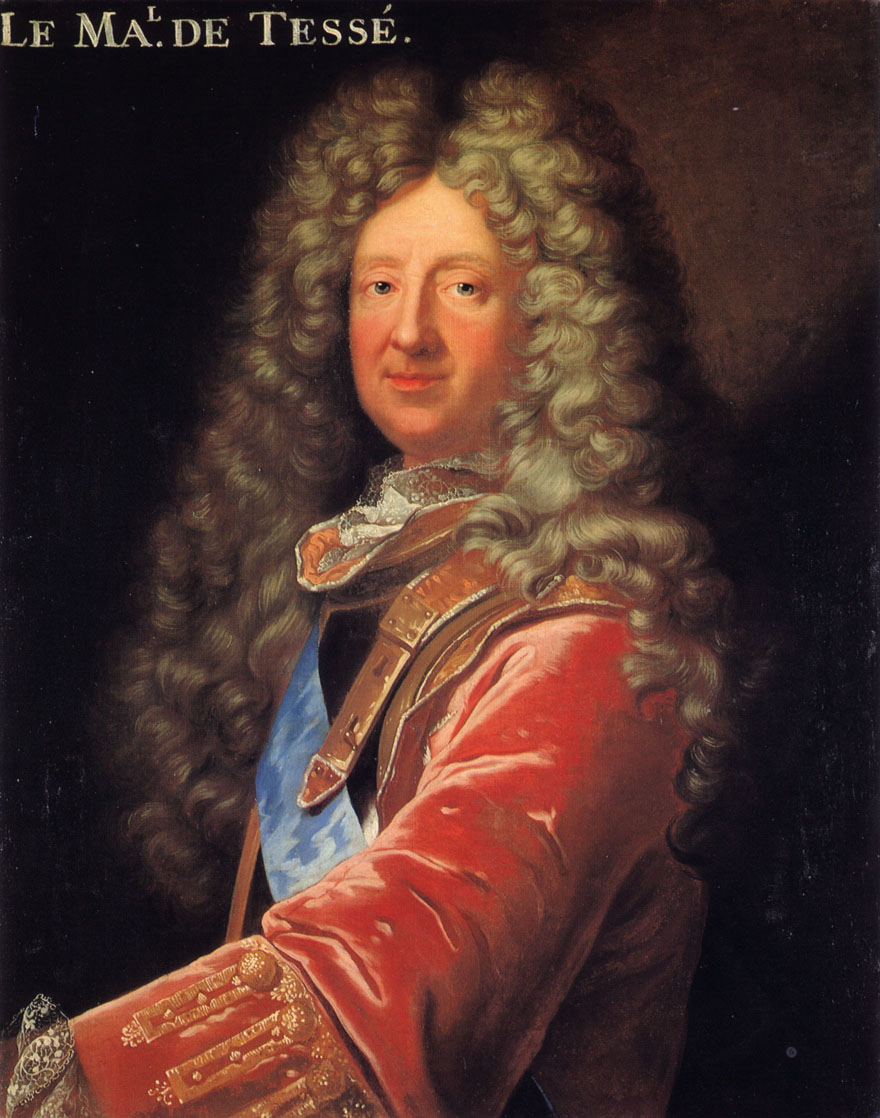
After Hyacinthe Rigaud, The Maréchal de Tessé (1700), musée de Tessé.

The museum is named after the count of Tessé since he was one of the most powerful families in the county under the Ancien Régime, it is housed in a Delarue-designed episcopal residence built in 1842 on the site of the large and small Hôtels de Tessé (razed earlier in 1842), and the nucleus of the town's collection of paintings was the count's private collection.

Two catalogues were made of his paintings in 1746 and 1794. The Tessé family had at least 400 works in its collection at the time of the revolutionary seizures, with most of them then moved to Vernie for storage. Part of their collection is still in the château de Vernie to the north-west of the town, another in the manor house of La Milesse, and the third part in the Musée de Tessé. All of the furnishings and panelling from the Grand Salon in their Hotel de Tessé in Paris are now in New York's Metropolitan Museum of Art.

The Tessé family always kept in close touch with the intellectuals in Le Mans and Paris, particularly Catherine de Rambouillet, Vincent Voiture, Paul Scarron and Madame de Sévigné. The count's wife had a sonata composed for her by Mozart. They were also passionate about horticulture, developing one of the finest gardens in France at the Hôtel de Lavardin in Le Mans.

== Collections ==
=== Ancient Egypt ===
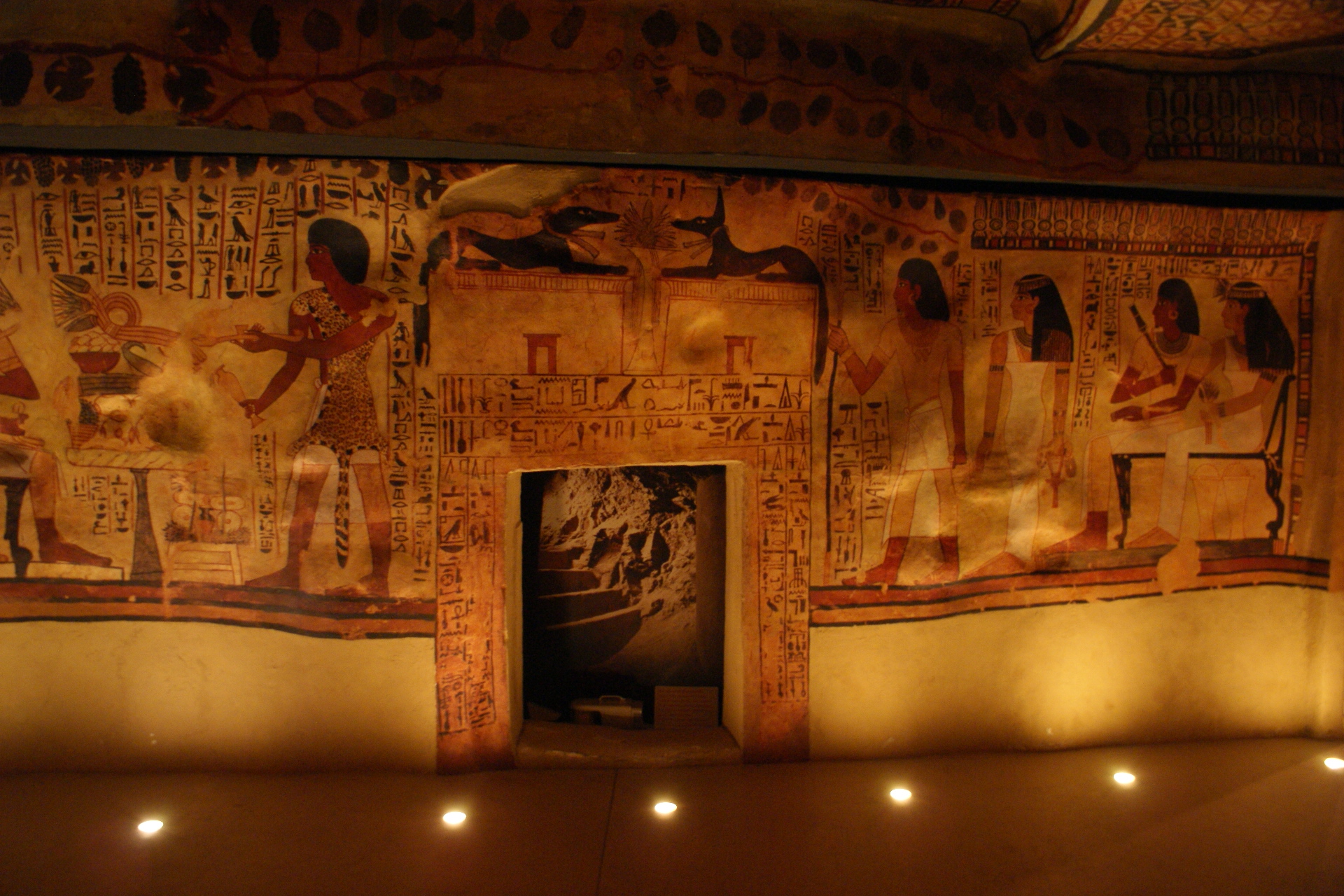
One of the reconstructed tombs.

It holds 125 objects from the 4th millennium BC onwards. Its Egyptological collection was first formed in 1819 by Édouard de Montulé, a traveller from Le Mans. In 1822 he gave his finds to the museums in Le Mans. This former private collection was expanded in 1913 thanks to items donated by Liger, then several purchases from a Louvre storeroom in 1983. It covers all aspects of ancient Egyptian civilisation, particularly daily life, funerary rites and intellectual life. The largest single group within the collection is the funerary items.

Two of the most-exhibited pieces are sarcophagi. One is for Ta Merer Mâât, a female singer in the cult of Amon during the 20th Dynasty. It is in painted stuccoed wood and was donated by Édouard de Montulé. The second is a mummy-shaped sarcophagus in stuccoed, gilded and painter wood, made for the priest Nakhmontou during the 17th Dynasty and acquired from the Louvre in 1983. He was mummified around 1550 BC and on his breast is a drawing of the goddess Mut, kneeling and holding out her arms like wings. A vertical long inscription gives Nakhmontou's name and identity as a royal scribe and priest at the temple of Montu, Egyptian goddess of the sky.

The collection also has a terracotta canopic jar in the form of a human head dating to around 1450 BC during the 18th Dynasty. On the centre of its front face it has an invocation requesting Isis to protect the person in the afterlife. The collection also has four vases designed to store the internal organs removed during mummification, found in tombs, where they were placed just before a person was interred.

=== Paintings ===
Its paintings are all European and range from the 14th to 20th centuries. It includes a particularly fine collection of Italian Primitives and a few Renaissance works, including ones by Pietro Lorenzetti (Saint Agatha), Francesco di Stefano Pesellino, Jacopo del Sellaio, Bartolomeo Bulgarini, and Antoniazzo Romano. A 2016 exhibition (and its catalogue by Corentin Dury) included the entire Italian collection, which ranges from the 14th to 18th centuries. - the exhibition and catalogue both won the 2022 Michel Laclotte Prize.

Diverse 17th century schools are also well-covered, with works by Bartolomeo Manfredi (Christ Crowned with Thorns, c. 1615 (Note: It was considered to be a copy, but was re-identified as an autograph work thanks to restoration in 2011-2012 and specialist study.)), Mattia Preti, Jacopo Vignali, Jacob Adriaensz Backer, Albert Cuyp, Theodoor Rombouts (The Meal), Willem Kalf (Large Still Life with Armour and Still Life with a Nautilus Shell), David Teniers the Younger (An Alchemist in his Workshop), Juan de Valdes Leal, Simon Vouet (Saint Veronica showing her Veil, 1628-1629), Jacques Stella, Philippe de Champaigne (Vanitas, Elijah's Dream and Adoration of the Magi), Nicolas Tournier (Drinkers), Charles Le Brun (God in Glory, c. 1675), Laurent de La Hyre, Eustache Le Sueur (Poliphilus at the Triumph of Bacchus), Jean Jouvenet and Bon Boullogne. Among the anonymous European works from that period are Allegory of Painting by a painter very close to Artemisia Gentileschi and from c.1640-1645 the best copy of The Ecstasy of St Francis, a lost original work by Georges de La Tour. All the French 17th century paintings in the collection are in a 1982 catalogue by Elisabeth Walter-Foucart.

The 18th century is mainly covered by French works by artists such as Jean-Baptiste Santerre, Pierre Parrocel, Nicolas de Largillierre, François de Troy, François Boucher (The Death of Socrates), Jean-Baptiste Oudry, Carle Van Loo, Gabriel-François Doyen, Anne Vallayer-Coster, Jean-Baptiste Huet and Lazare Bruandet (Landscape). The 19th century holdings are more international, including Portrait of a Man and his Children (Note: Formerly Portrait of a Member of the French Convention or Convention Member Michel Gérard and his family) by a member of Jacques-Louis David's circle and works by John Constable (Malvern Hall), Jean-Auguste-Dominique Ingres, Théodore Géricault (Portrait, thought to be Olivier Bro, c. 1818), Jean-Baptiste Isabey, Anne-Louis Girodet, François Marius Granet, Camille Corot, Théodore Chassériau, Georges Moreau de Tours (Blanche of Castille, also known as Love Among the Poor) and Francis Tattegrain. There are few 20th century works, including several by Roger de La Fresnaye, born in Le Mans.

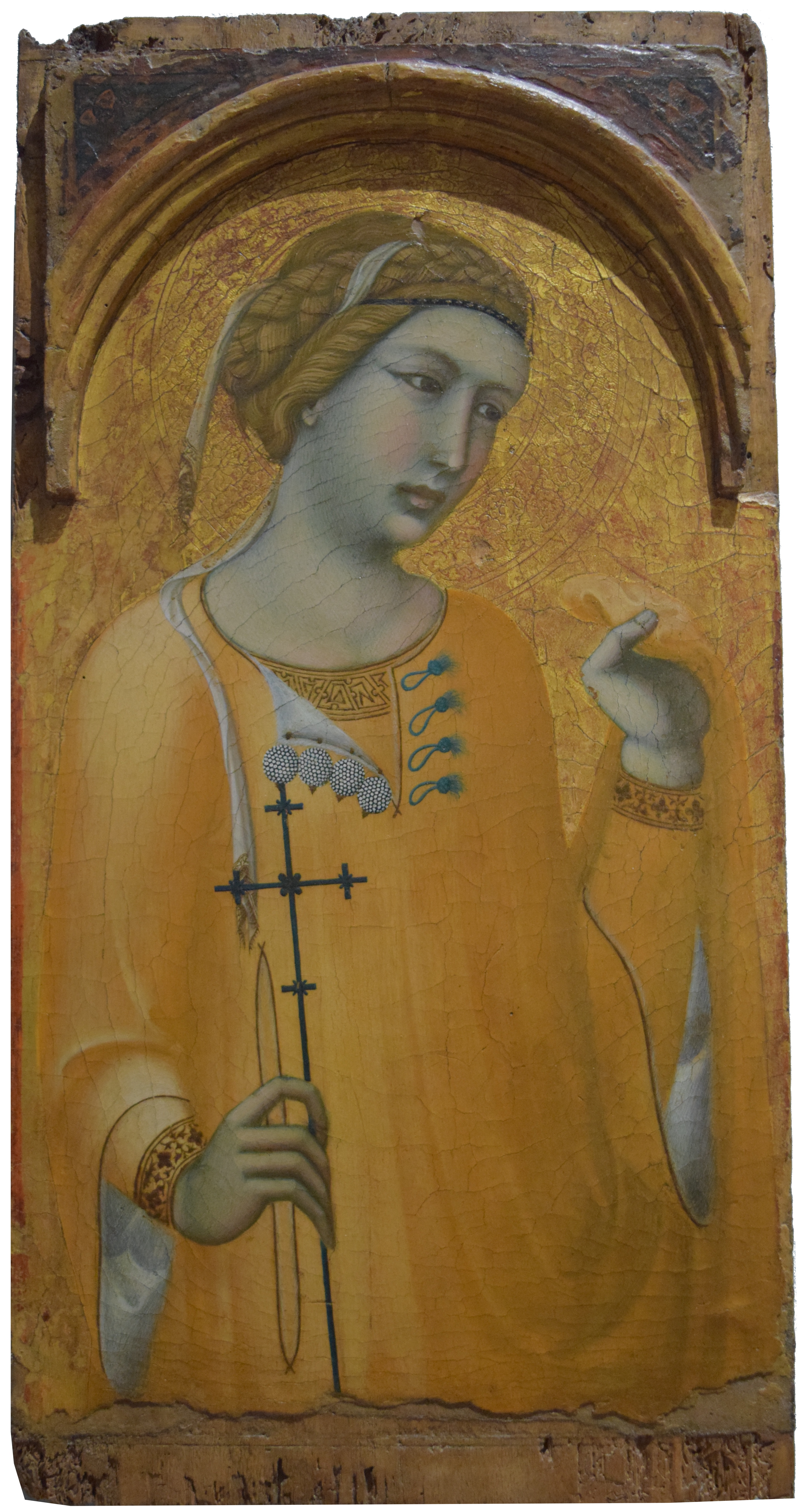
Attributed to Pietro Lorenzetti, Saint Agatha, c. 1315.

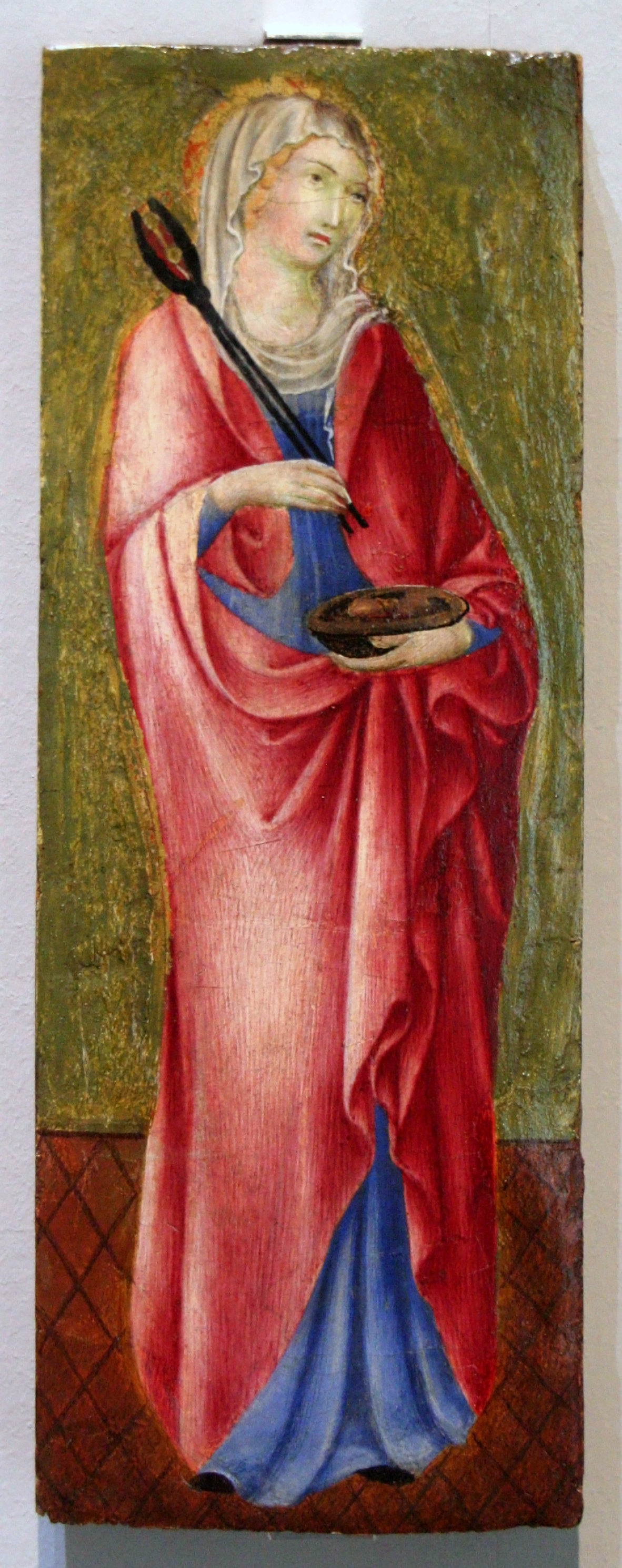
Sano di Pietro, Saint Agatha, c. 1445-1450.

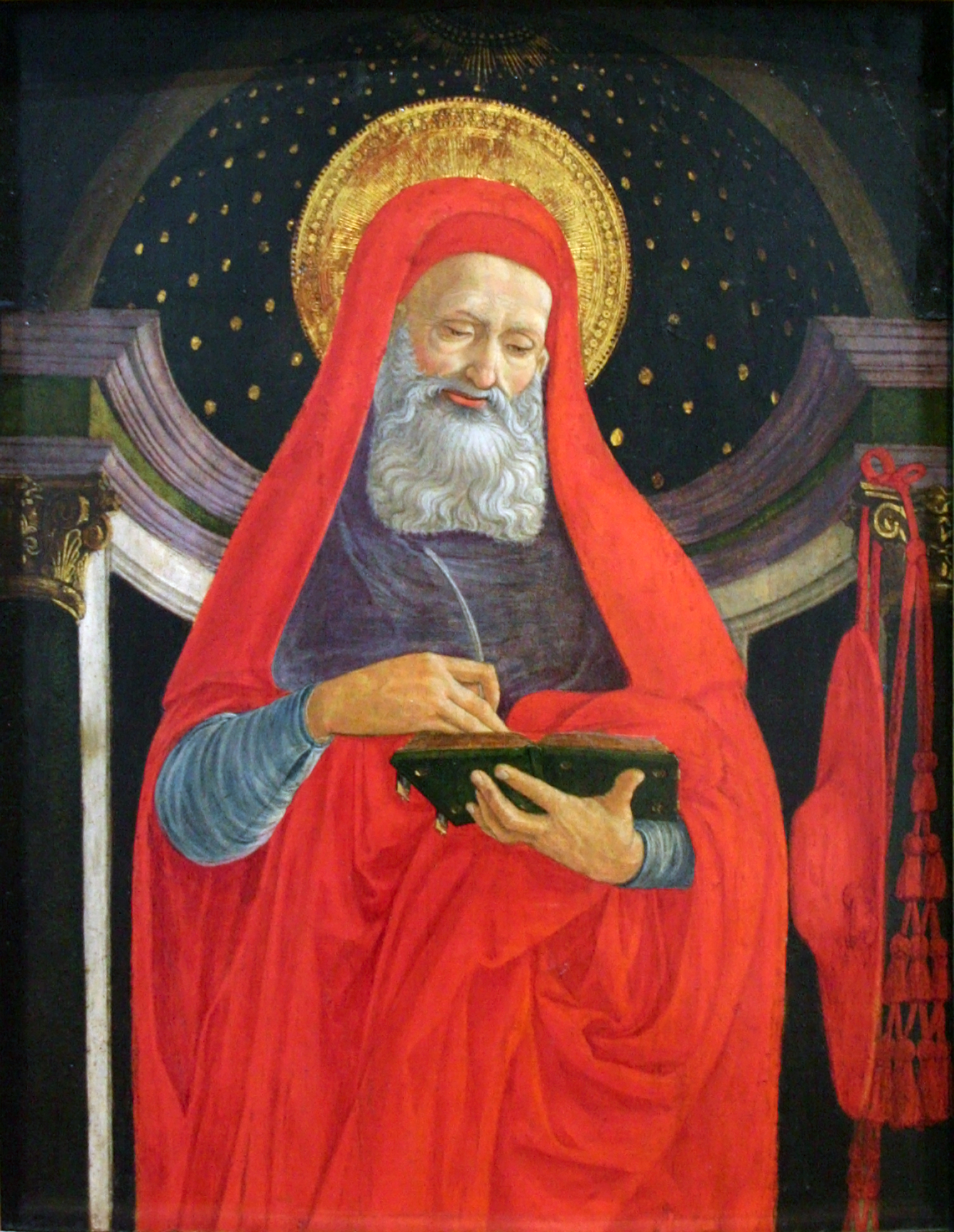
Attributed to Baldassare di Biagio, Saint Jerome, 15th century.

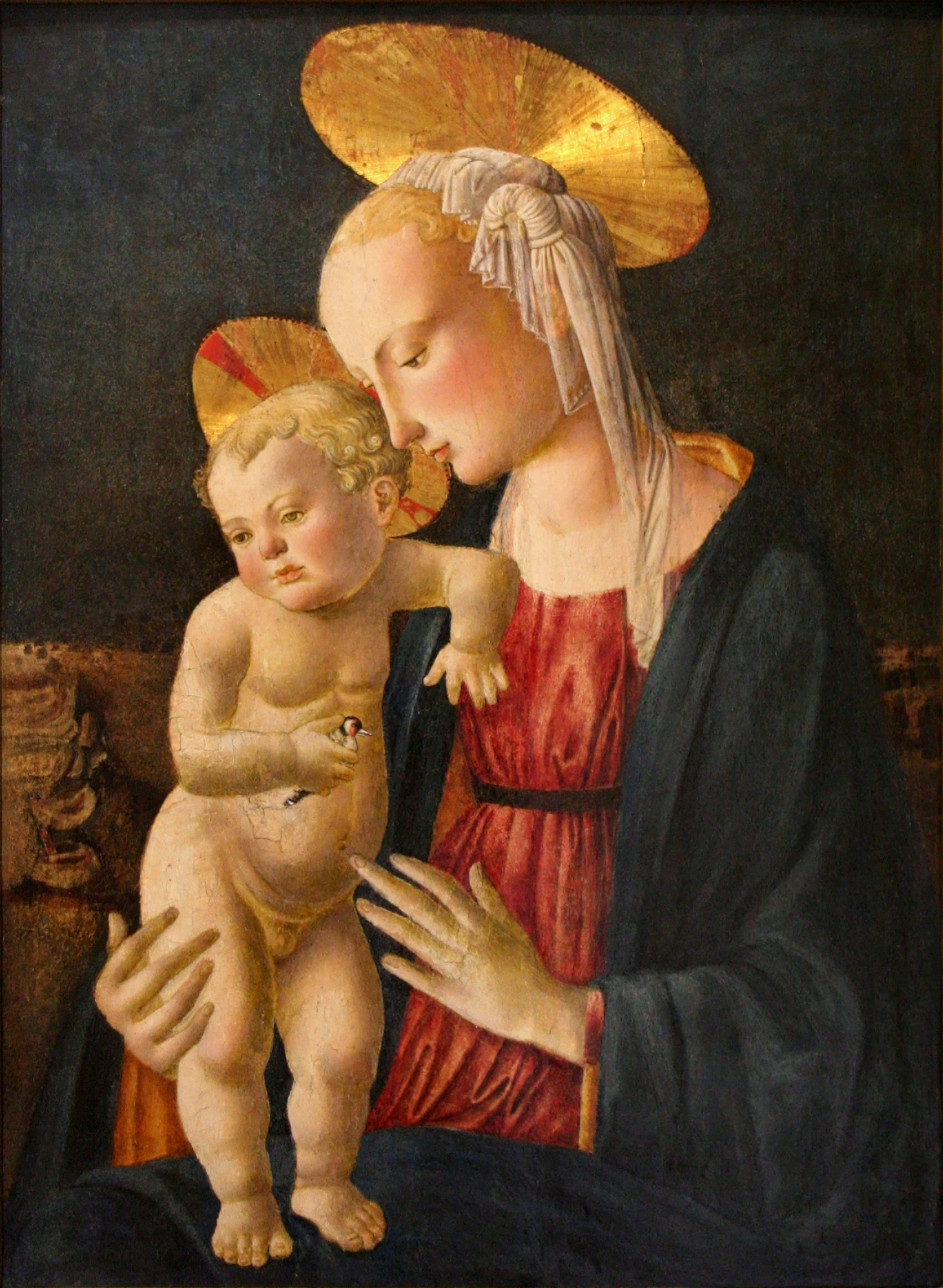
Master of San Miniato, Madonna and Child with a Goldfinch, 1450-1499.

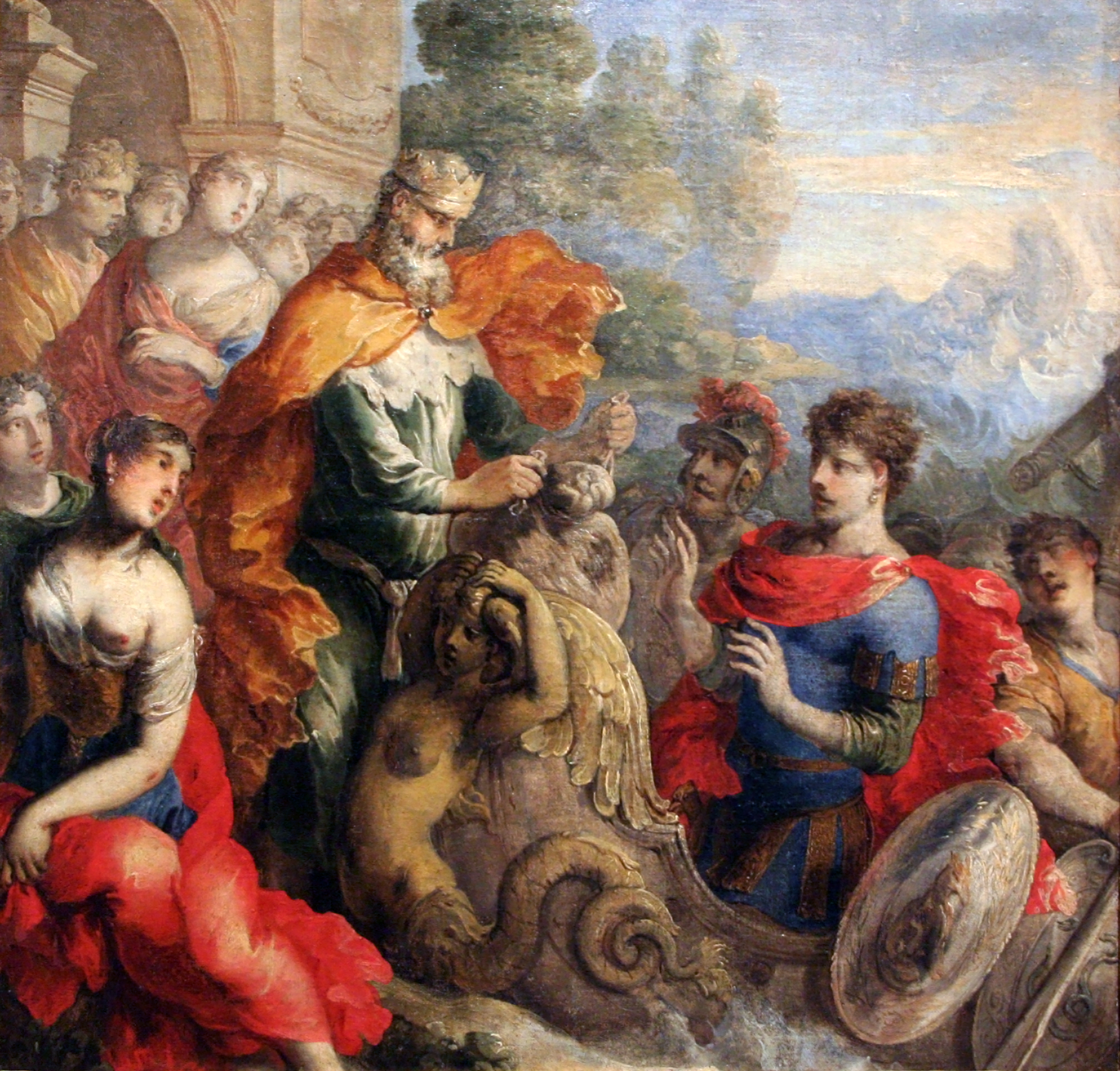
Isaac Moillon, Aeolus Giving the Winds to Ulysses, 18th century

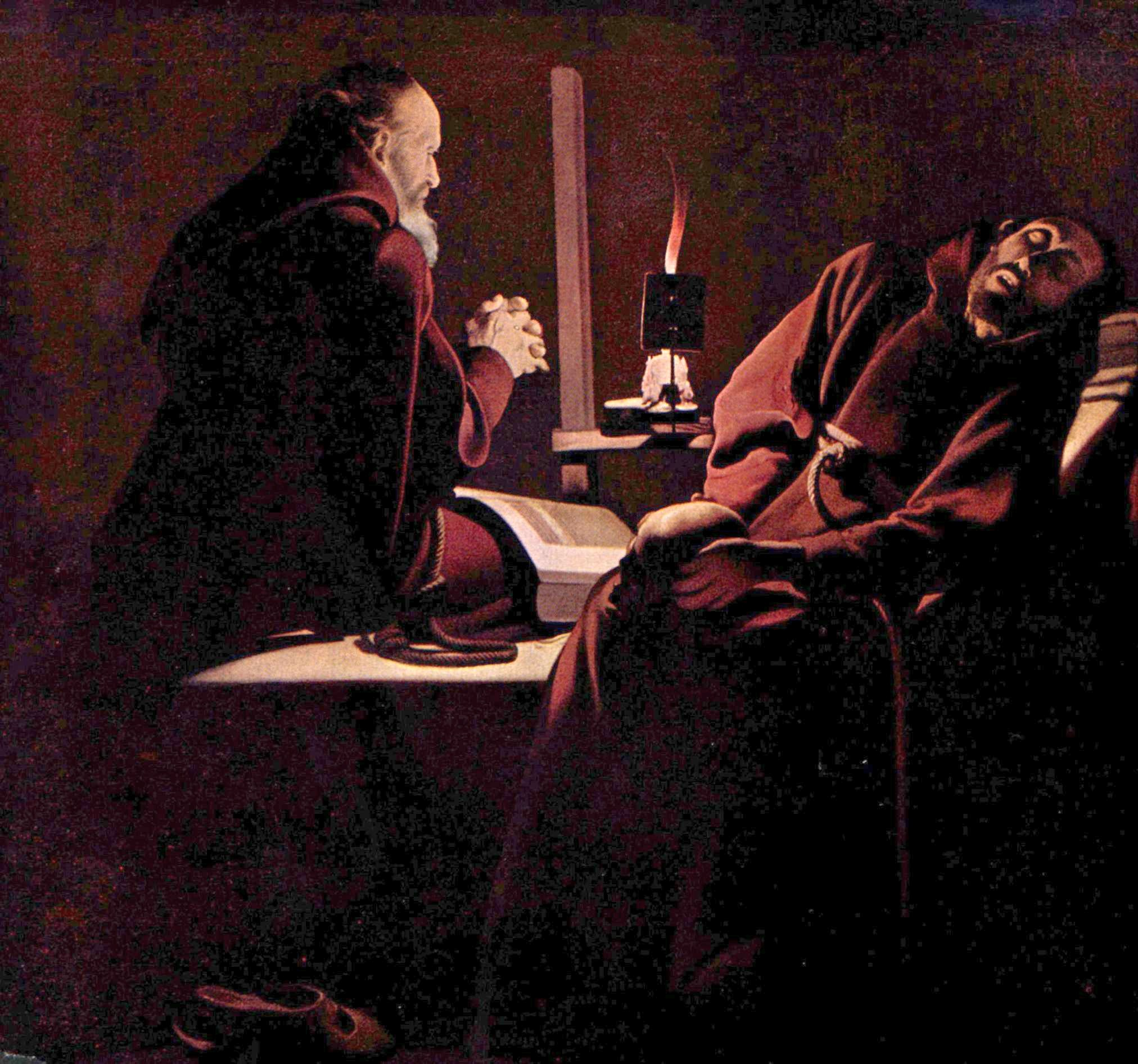
After Georges de La Tour, The Ecstasy of St Francis (c. 1640-1645).

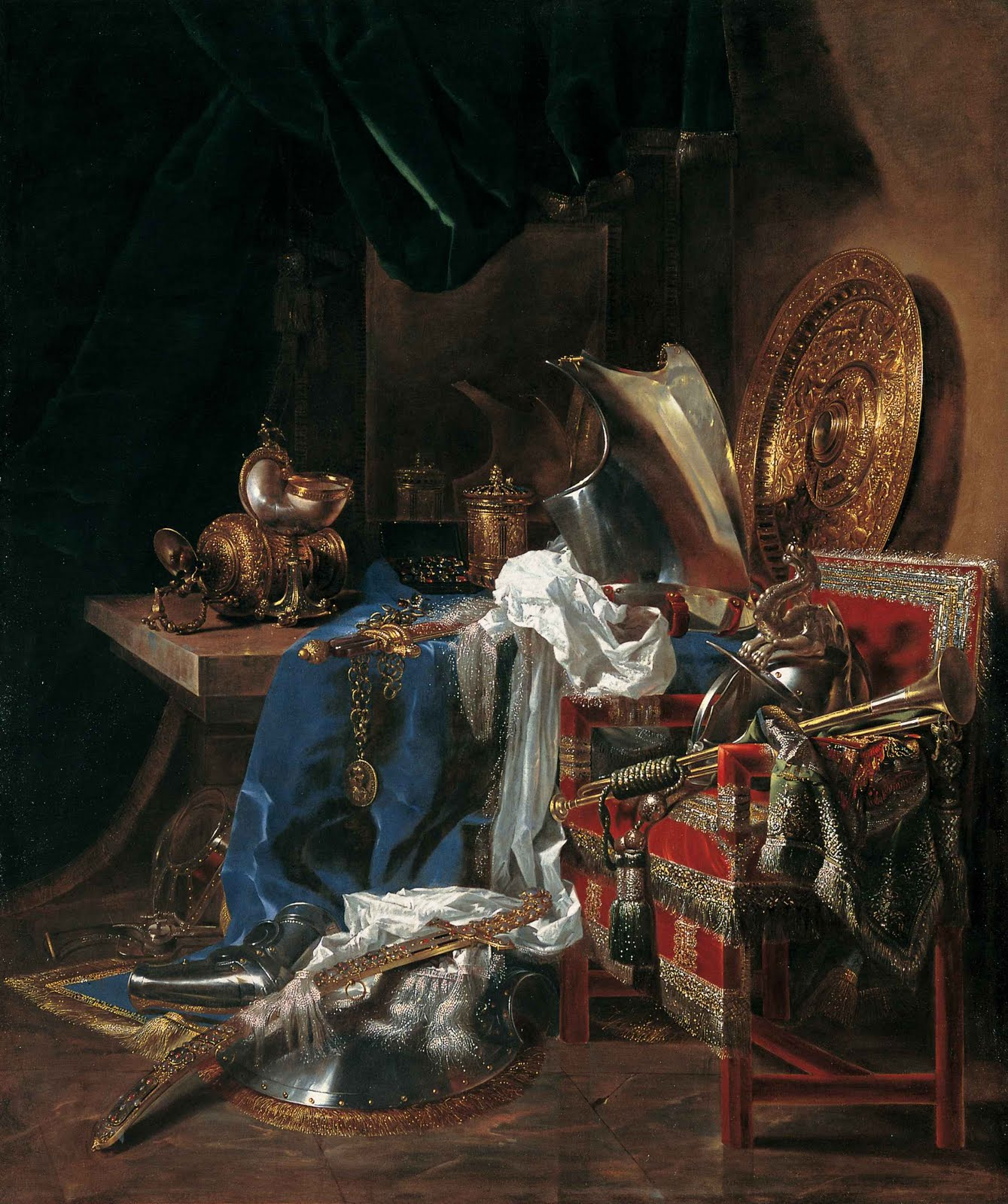
Willem Kalf, Large Still Life with Armour (c. 1643 or 1645).

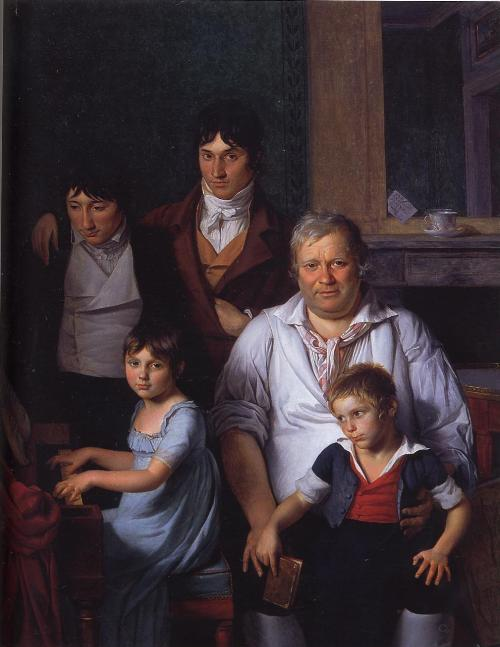
Circle of Jacques Louis David, Portrait of a Man and his Children (early 19th century).

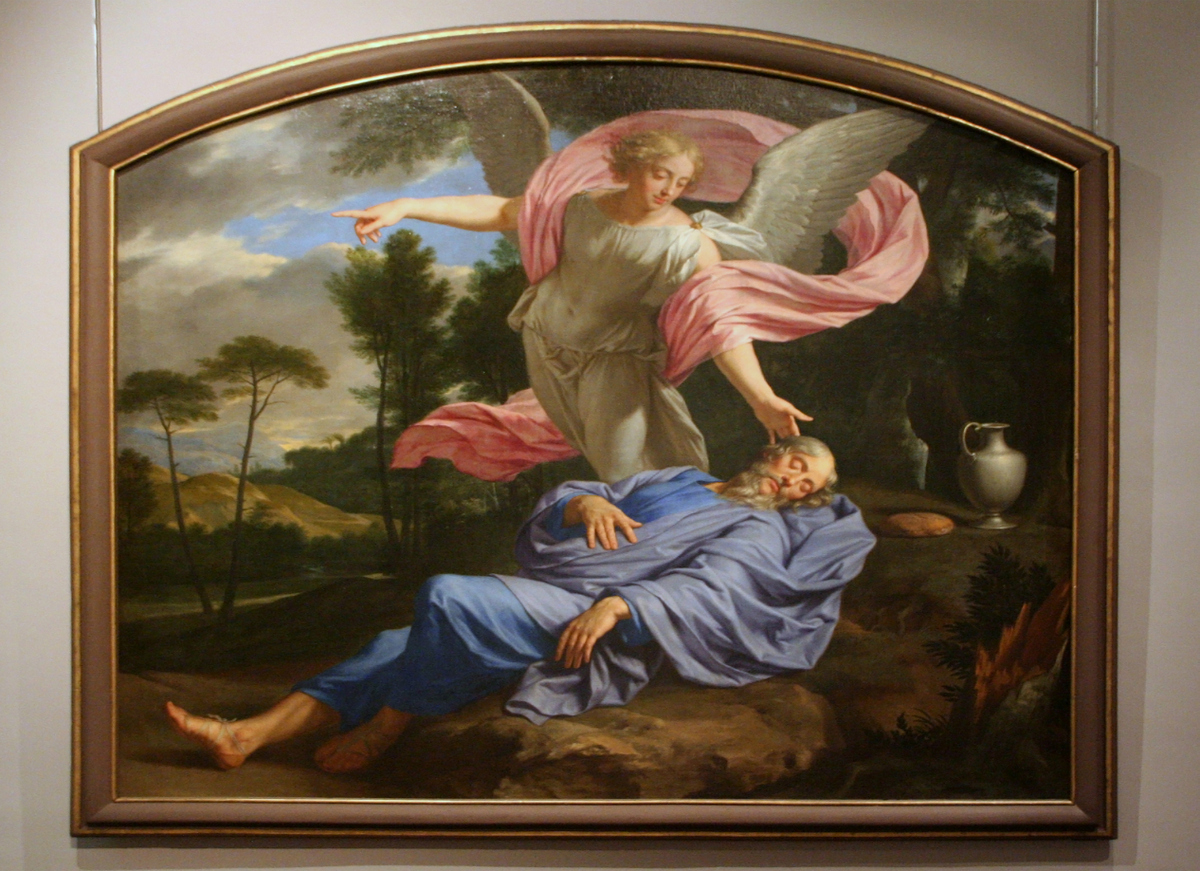
Philippe de Champaigne, Elijah's Dream (c. 1660).

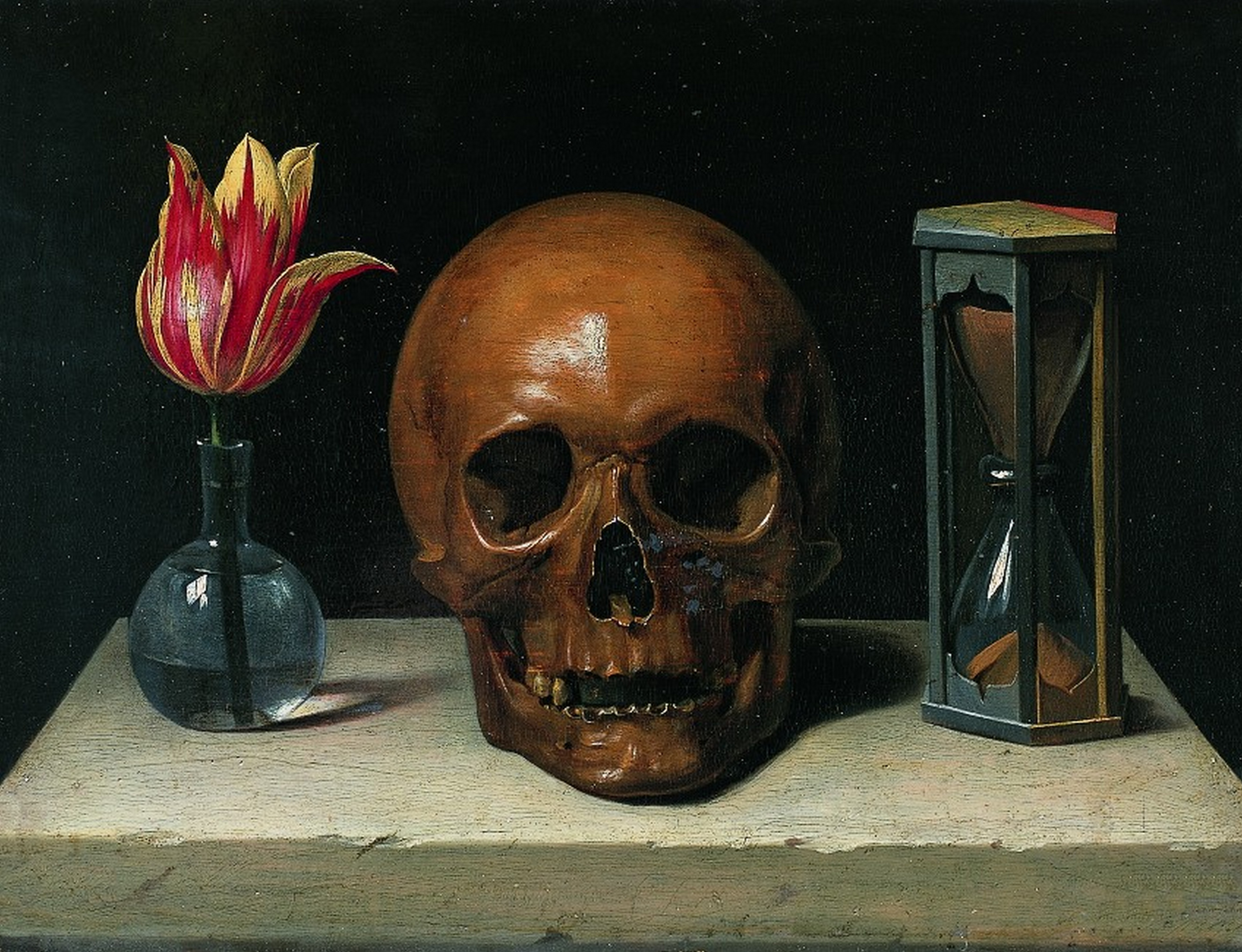
Philippe de Champaigne, Vanitas (1644).

== See also ==
- Category:Paintings in the Musée de Tessé

== Bibliography (in French) ==
=== History of the museum ===
- Françoise Chaserant (ed.), Les Musées du Mans ont 200 ans (exhibition catalogue), Le Mans, 1999.

=== Collection catalogues ===
- Arsène Le Feuvre and Arsène Alexandre, Musée de Tessé : catalogue du musée des Arts. Peinture, sculpture, dessins, gravures, objets d'art, Le Mans. 1932.
- Elisabeth Walter-Foucart, Le Mans, musée de Tessé : peinture française du 17th century, Paris, 1982.
- Dury, Corentin (2016). Peintures italiennes et hispaniques: collections du musée de Tessé, XIVe-XVIIIe siècles. Gent: Snoeck. ISBN 978-94-6161-340-0. OCLC 965462669.

=== Exhibition catalogues ===
- Autour de Simon Vouet, edited by Françoise Chaserant, Ivonne Papin-Drastik, Barbara Brejon de Lavergnée et Marie Cabane (exhibition catalogue), Coutances, 1996.
- Eloge de la clarté : un courant artistique au temps de Mazarin, 1640-1660, sous la dir. d'Alain Mérot (cat. exp; Dijon, musée Magnin. Le Mans, musée de Tessé. 1998-1999), Paris, 1998.
- Un chef-d'œuvre redécouvert : Le Couronnement d'épines de Bartolomeo Manfredi. Restauration, edited by Corentin Dury (exhibition catalogue, 2014), Le Mans, 2014.
