= Édouard de Montulé =

French traveller (1792–1828)

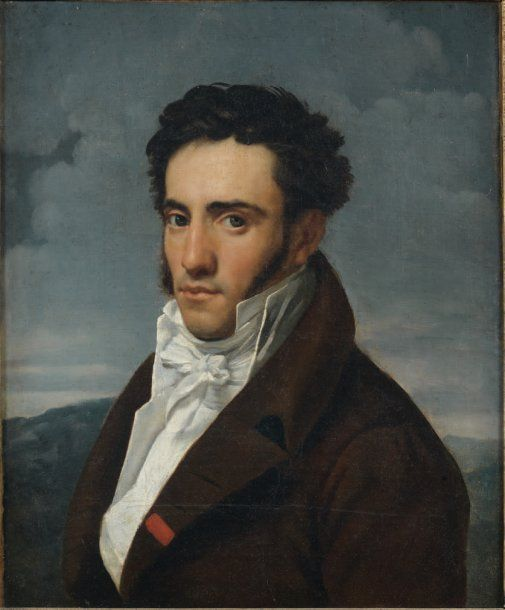
Portrait painted in Rome in 1818, attributed to Marie-Anne-Julie Forestier.

Édouard René Pierre Charles Dubois de Montulé (12 May 1792 – 1 March 1828) was a French traveller and travel writer. His travel writings are notable for their maps, illustrations and hand engravings.

== Biography ==
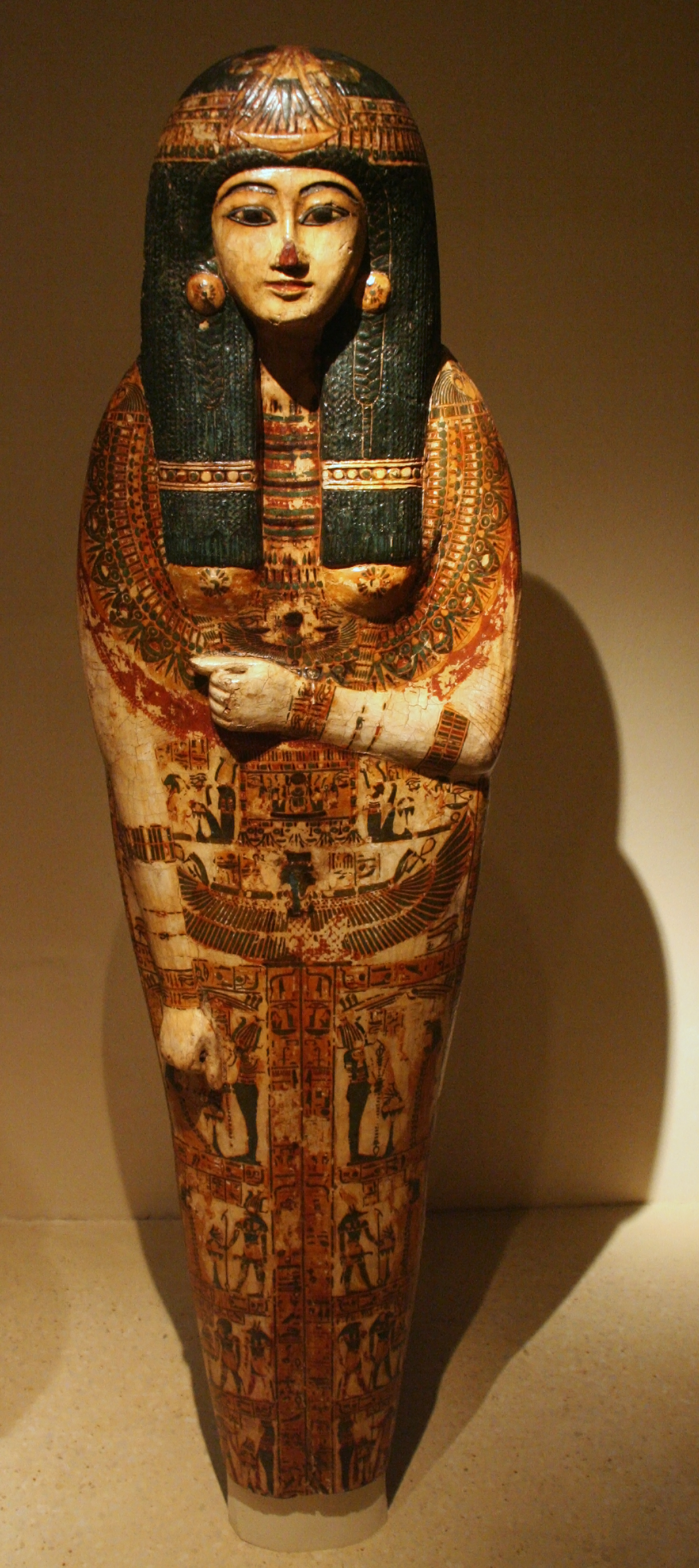
Sarcophagus donated to the musée de Tessé by de Montulé.

Born in the Sainte-Croix district of Le Mans, he joined the military school in Saint-Germain before becoming a lieutenant in the mounted chasseurs on 24 April 1812 and being wounded the following year. He was in the army for the 1813 campaign in German and was made a knight of the Legion of Honour on 13 September that year.

From September 1816 to October 1817, he took a long journey in North America and the Antilles. Leaving Paimbœuf on 19 September, he arrived in New York City on 6 November before visiting Philadelphia. In January 1817, he landed at Saint Thomas before travelling on to the French colony of Saint-Domingue and on 16 April arriving in New Orleans.

He took a trip on the Ohio River by steamboat, making a long stay in Louisville, Kentucky before reaching Pittsburgh on 15 July. He then passed through Frankfort, Lexington, Chillicothe and Wheeling. On 31 July he saw Niagara Falls then crossed the Appalachians to reach Albany. He then went down the Hudson River by boat, passed through Philadelphia again and stayed in New York a second time, leaving the latter for Europe on 6 October 1817.

On 2 December he reached Livorno, staying in Italy and Malta for a time, before sailing to Egypt (October 1818–February 1819), where he collected items now in the Musée de Tessé in Le Mans. His last voyage was to Britain and Russia (1821–1823), before dying in Le Mans.

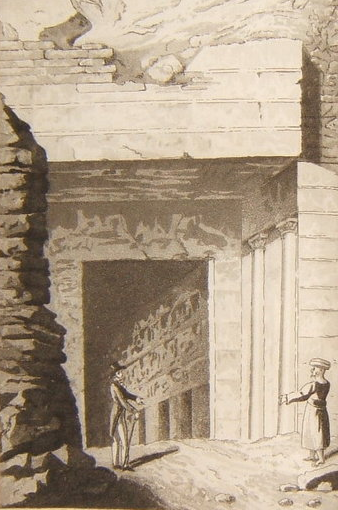
Entrance to a royal tomb in Thebes, drawing by Édouard de Montulé

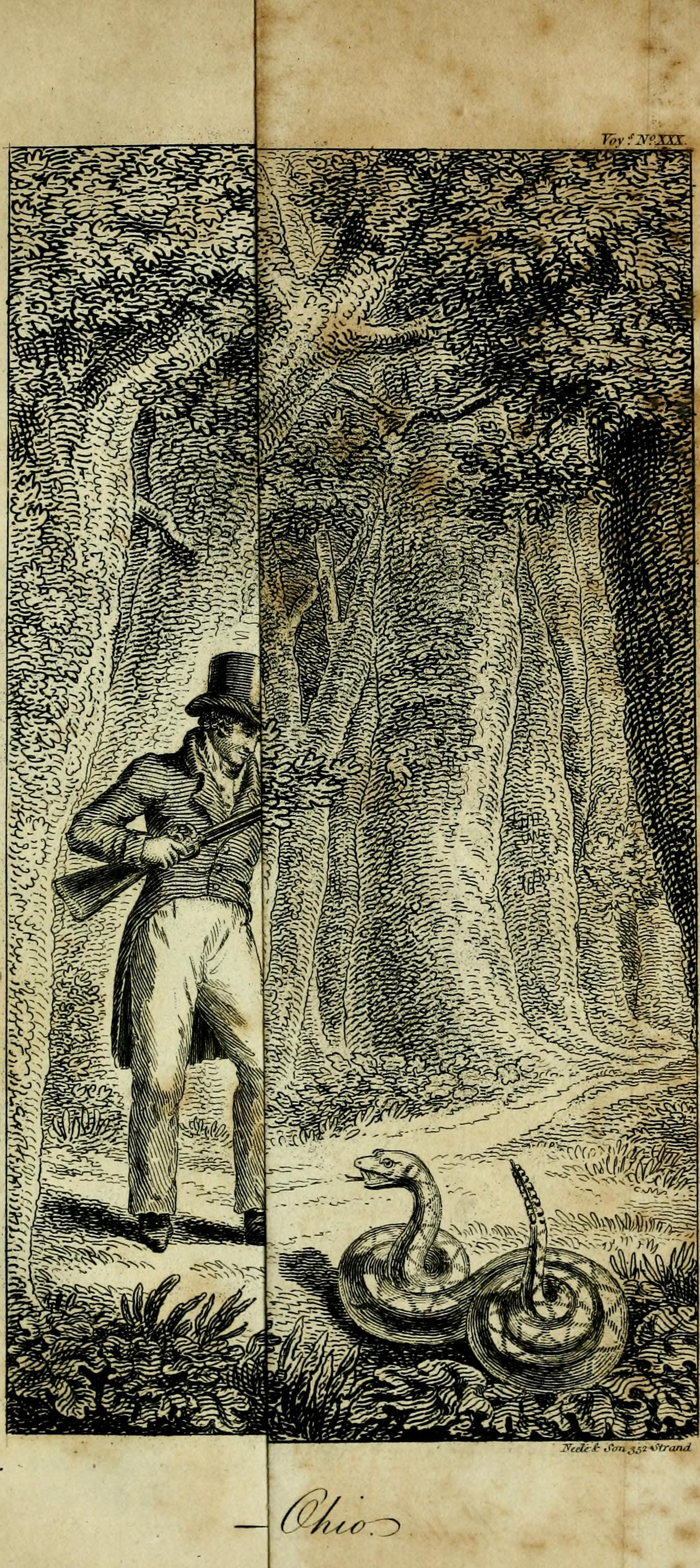
Édouard de Montulé, illustration for Voyage en Amérique, en Italie, en Sicile et en Égypte pendant les années 1816, 1817, 1818 et 1819

== Works ==
- Voyage en Amérique, en Italie, en Sicile et en Égypte pendant les années 1816, 1817, 1818 et 1819, 1821
- Recueil des cartes et des vues du voyage en Amérique en Italie en Sicile et en Égypte fait pendant les années 1816, 1817, 1818 et 1819, 1821
- Voyage en Angleterre et en Russie en 1821, 1822 et 1823, 1825

== Bibliography ==
- Narcisse-Henri-François Desportes, Bibliographie du Maine, 1844, p. 285 (In French)
- Numa Broc, Dictionnaire des explorateurs français du XIX siecle, t. 3, Amérique, CTHS, 1999, p. 230-231 (In French)
