= Elijah's Dream =

Painting by Philippe de Champaigne

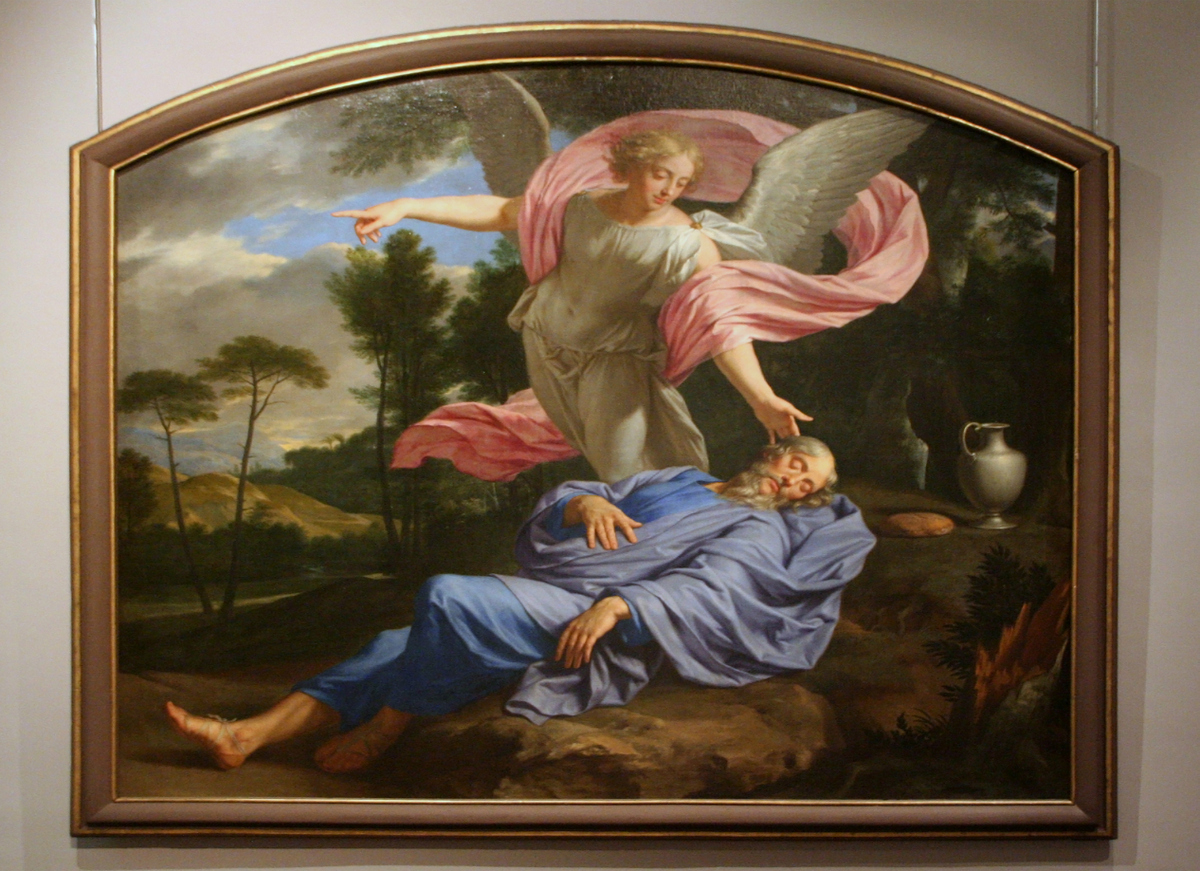
Elijah's Dream (c. 1650-1655) by Philippe de Champaigne

Elijah's Dream is an oil on canvas painting by Philippe de Champaigne, from c. 1650-1655. It is held in the musée de Tessé in Le Mans A similar earlier work by the artist is his 1642 The Dream of Saint Joseph (National Gallery, London) for the Chapelle des Minimes de la place Royale.
