= Saint Agatha (Lorenzetti) =

Painting by Pietro Lorenzetti

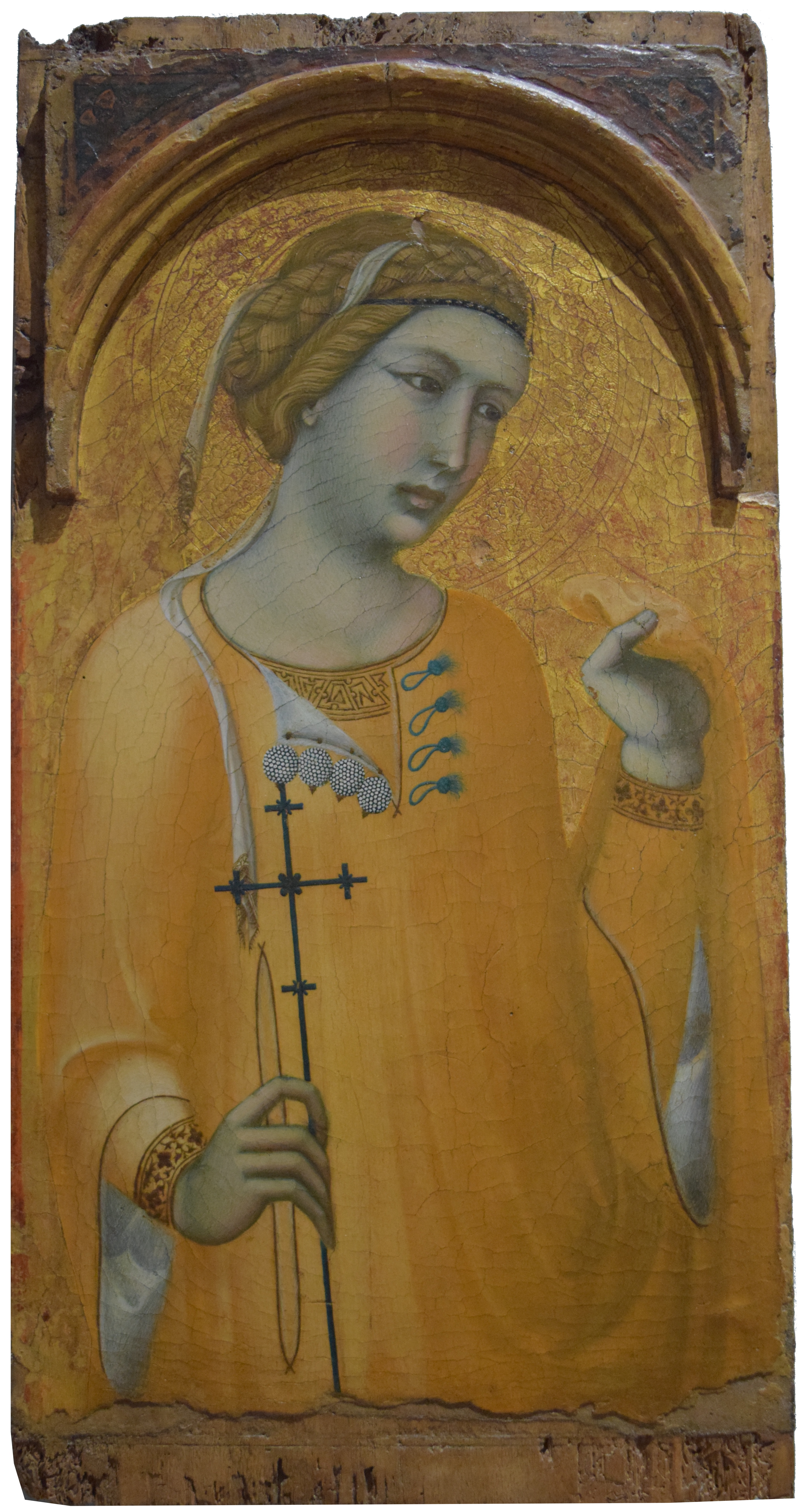

Saint Agatha is a c.1315 tempera on panel painting attributed to the Sienese painter Pietro Lorenzetti. It was probably part of a now-split-up larger multi-panel altarpiece. It shows a saint holding a cross in one hand and holding up part of her orange dress in the other. She was long thought to be Agnes of Rome or Margaret of Antioch, but was reidentified to Agatha of Sicily in 1909 by Bernard Berenson - the notch in her top links it to Agatha, whose breasts were cut off during her martyrdom. It was acquired in 1863 by the musée de Tessé in Le Mans.
