= Vanitas (Champaigne) =

Painting attributed to Philippe de Champaigne

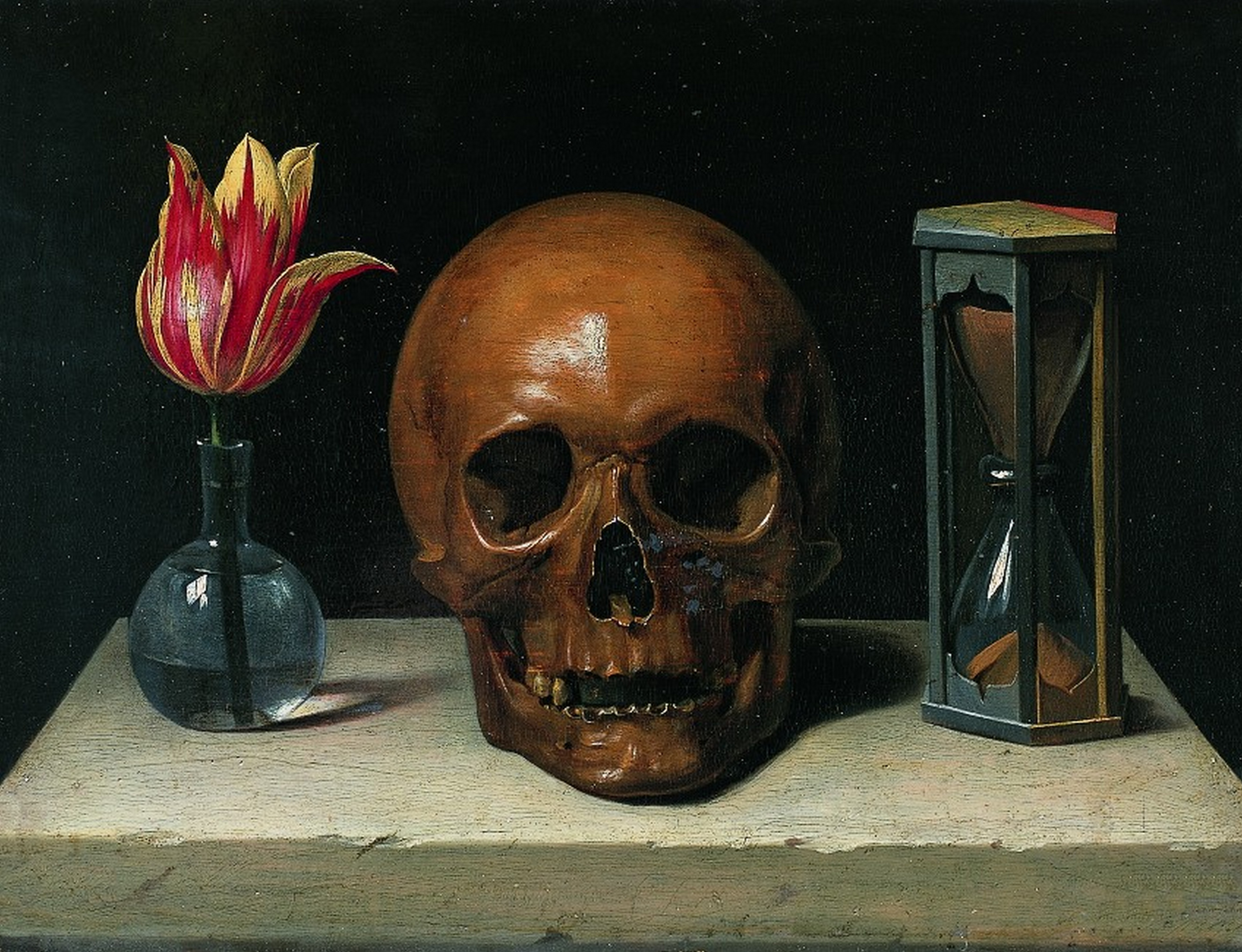
Vanitas (1646) by Philippe de Champaigne

Vanitas, also known as Allegory of Human Life or Still Life with a Skull, is an oil on panel painting attributed to Philippe de Champaigne, from 1667. It is held in the musée de Tessé, in Le Mans, which bought it at a public auction in 1884.
