= Saint Agatha (Sano di Pietro) =

Painting by Sano di Pietro

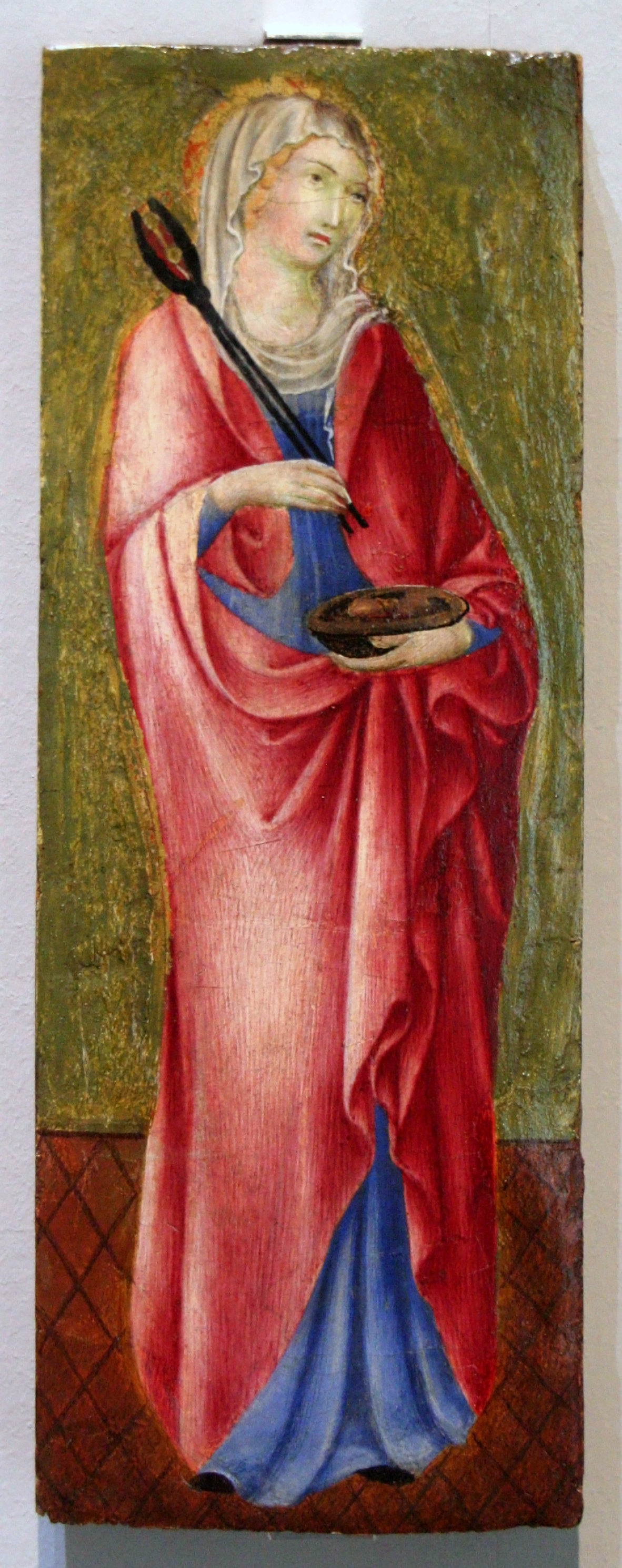

Saint Agatha is a c.1445-1450 vertical tempera and gold on panel painting of Agatha of Sicily by Sano di Pietro, probably from a larger altarpiece. In her left hand the saint holds a bowl containing her breasts, whilst in her right is the pair of pliers used to tear off her breasts during her martyrdom.

It was bought for the musée de Tessé in Le Mans in 1863.
