= Louis-Marie Auvray =

Louis-Marie, baron Auvray (12 October 1762 - 11 November 1833) was a French general and administrator under the Bourbon Restoration in France and a prefect under the First French Empire.

A street in Le Mans, near his prefecture, is named after him.

== Family ==
His family originated in Normandy but was based in the Mantois and Paris in the 17th and 18th century. They finally settled in the Touraine, with one of his ancestors serving as a squire to Henry IV of France and another, Louis Auvray, was appointed lieutenant to the provost of France's light cavalry in 1665

His father Cpyrien (3 November 1720, Paris - 4 January 1783, Poitiers) was a lawyer to the Parlement, first secretary to the Intendance of La Rochelle and Poitiers. He married Élisabeth-Jeanne-Charlotte Rousset on 8 September 1749.

== Life ==
Born in Poitiers, Louis-Marie became secretary to the intendance of Paris but soon left that post to join the army. He was made a supernumerary in the queen's gendarmerie in 1780 before becoming a 'sous-officier' in the Gardes-Françaises. After the French Revolution he was promoted to captain in the Parisian National Guard in 1790 and at the same rank moved to the 104th Line Infantry Regiment the following year.

He rose to chef de bataillon in that regiment and served in it for several years before being made colonel of the 40th Line Infantry Regiment. Some unpleasant experiences during his military service and his disgust at widespread favouritism he witnessed led him to leave the army after the 1796-1797 campaigns in Italy. After 18 brumaire Napoleon Bonaparte realised the agitation in Sarthe and wished to make a former soldier prefect of that department to quell it. He chose Auvray, who was made prefect by a decree of the consuls on 2 March 1800 and installed on 6 May the same year.

His firmness and prudence proved his abilities as an administrator were equal to his bravery as a soldier. In March 1802 Auvray declined a summons to join the Corps Legislatif and remained as prefect. He was made a Knight of the Legion of Honour on 14 June 1804. In the meantime, in 1802, he had had a Statistique du département de la Sarthe published in octavo in Paris at the request of the Interior Minister - this was one of the most detailed surveys since the department's creation in 1790 and brought Auvray much good publicity. It included, among others, four large fold-out charts entitled "State of the national woods and forests", "Painting of the mineral substances observed in the Sarthe department, arranged according to Daubenton's method", "State of the national estates of all origins, unalienated..." and "Status report on the national estates".

His coat of arms as a baron - Quartered: in 1, azure, a shield, or, charged with a shield, azure, inscribed with the number 40, argent; 2, symbol of baron prefects; 3, gules, a key, argent palewise; 4, an olive tree, or, with fruit, argent. ·

His administration was notable for organising the musée du Mans and enriching its collections. He was president of the Société libre des arts pour le département de la Sarthe in 1805, 1806 and 1813. On 15 August 1809 (by letters patent of 31 January 1810) he was made 1st Baron Auvray et de l'Empire but despite Auvray's good service Napoleon was unhappy with him and dismissed him as prefect on 11 March 1813. The provisional government made him part of the delegation charged with welcoming the comte d'Artois.

Under the First Restoration in 1814 the royal government appointed him prefect of Le Mans. Around the same time he rejoined the army, being promoted to maréchal de camp and on 13 August 1814 appointed a Knight in the Order of Saint Louis by Louis XVIII. From 1817 to 1827 he was mayor of Fondettes, where he also died in his château de Taillé in 1833.

== Marriage and issue ==
On 1 May 1803 he married Françoise Pellegrain de Lestang (1781-1869, Tours), daughter of Charles Noël Pellegrain de Lestang, a captain in the régiment de La Ferté, knight in the order of Saint Louis and of Elisabeth Louise Massue, dame de La Chapelle-Gaugain. They had:

- Anatole Louis Le Mans (6 October 1804-8 November 1856, Fondettes), 2nd Baron Auvray, cavalry officer, mayor of Fondettes (1840-1857), counsellor to the arrondissement of Tours; on 20 May 1834 married Pauline-Olympe-Clémentine de Villiers du Terrage (daughter of viscount Paul Étienne de Villiers du Terrage), with whom he had :

- Thérèse Pauline Louise, nun ;
- Louise Jeanne Marie, married Marie Albert Anselme Chaullet de La Ribellerie, comte d'Outremont, artillery officer (brother of monsignor Hector-Albert Chaulet d'Outremont) ;
- Anatole Paul Marie (4 October 1843, Tours - April 1920, Tours), 3rd Baron Auvray, married, with whom he had:

- Pierre (1873-1900) ;
- Pauline, married Xavier, comte de Poix ;
- Thérèse, married Adrien, baron de Montpellier de Vedrin ;
- Anatole Louis Joseph (5 March 1881, Tours - 17 November 1916, Villers-Bretonneux (Somme), brigadier in the 9th Train Squadron, dead of illness whilst a prisoner of war; married Solange de Bonnefoy (1892 - 1966) (she remarried two times after his death), with whom he had :

- Pierre (1912-1970), 4th Baron Auvray, married Jacqueline de Nonville, with whom he had :

- Marie-Solange (born 30 March 1945, Thouaré-sur-Loire), married; father of ;

- Albert (11 August 1914, Saint-Jean-le-Vieux (Ain) - 9 December 1996), 5th Baron Auvray; married; had issue:

- Elisabeth, married, had issue ;
- Béatrice, married, had issue ;
- Hubert Jacques Guy (9 August 1946, Thouaré-sur-Loire), 6th Baron Auvray); on 2 April 1970 married Marie-Claude (born 17 June 1950), daughter of Scévole Pocquet, comte de Livonnière (1 June 1912, Allonnes, Maine-et-Loire -23 October 2003, Beaufort-en-Vallée) and Marie-Béatrice La Grua et Talamanca de Carini (born 27 June 1917, Paris), owners of the château de Sainte-Suzanne (Mayenne))

- Louis-René (born 7 June 1810), infantry officer, mayor of Tours (1865); in April 1837 married Flavie Loiseau; had issue :

- Raoul (né le 23 mars 1838), conseiller de préfecture, maire de Pernay, propriétaire du château de la Ronde; on 6 August 1867 married Marie-Cécile Goüin (1847-1937), daughter of Eugène Goüin and granddaughter of baron Antoine-Gabriel Christin, had issue :

- Louis-René (born 1868), cavalry officer; married Marie Hébrard de Villeneuve, daughter of Henry Hébrard de Villeneuve, had issue :

- Henry, married Jeanne-Marie Thibault de La Carte de La Ferté-Sénectère (half-sister of general Georges de la Ferté-Sénectère) ;

- Jeanne Flavie Valentine (nborn 24 June 1870); married Philippe Lacroix de Vimeur, marquis de Rochambeau, stud officer, son of Achille de Rochambeau and Marie Isabelle Dutey-Harispe ;
- Eugène (born 1873), married Renée Lefebvre, from Roubaix ;

- Arthur (22 January 1840-1916); married a Miss Taigny, then Louise-Marie Nacquart (granddaughter of Dr Jean-Baptiste Nacquart).

- Hélène (1872-1960); married Charles Percheron de Monchy, cavalry officer and owner of the château de la Grifferie, son of the regent of the Banque de France Adrien Percheron de Monchy.
- Raymond (1874-1946), bibliophile and collector, president of the "Amis du Vieux Tours" and of the Indre-et-Loire section of the French Red Cross.
- Henry (1878-1947), archaeologist, entomologist and poet.

The family of baron Louis-Marie Auvray is one of the surviving noble families from the First Empire.

== Publications ==
- Statistique du département de la Sarthe (Paris, 1802, in-8).

== External links (in French) ==
- Liste des préfets de la Sarthe on www.sarthe.pref.gouv.fr ;
- www.galaxidion.com ;
- Les Préfets on thierry.pouliquen.free.fr.

== Bibliography (in French) ==
- Biographie des hommes vivants: ou, Histoire par ordre alphabétique de la vie publique de tous les hommes qui se sont fait remarquer par leurs actions ou leurs écrits, by Louis Gabriel Michaud, 1816 ;
- Galerie historique des contemporaines, by Pierre Louis Pascal de Jullian, 1822 ;
- Biographie des préfets, depuis l'organisation des préfectures (3 mars 1800) jusqu'à ce jour, by Étienne Léon Lamothe-Langon, published by Chez les Marchands de Nouveautés, 1826, republished by Adamant Media Corporation, ISBN 0543921743, ISBN 9780543921741 ;
- Annuaire biographique, ou supplément annuel et continuation de toutes les biographies ou dictionnaires historiques. Années 1830-1834, by Mathieu-Richard-Auguste Henrion, published by Paul Méquignon, 1834 ;
- Dictionnaire topographique, historique et statistique de la Sarthe, suivi d'une biographie et d'une bibliographie, by Julien Rémy Pesche, published 1834 ;
- La littérature française contemporaine, by Joseph-Marie Quérard, Félix Bourquelot, Charles-Léopold Louandre, Alfred Maury, published by Daguin, 1842 ;
- Mémoires de la Société archéologique de Touraine, published 1866 by the Société archéologique de Touraine.
- "Notice no. LH/79/58". Base Léonore (in French).
