= Portrait of a Man and His Children =

French painting by unknown painter

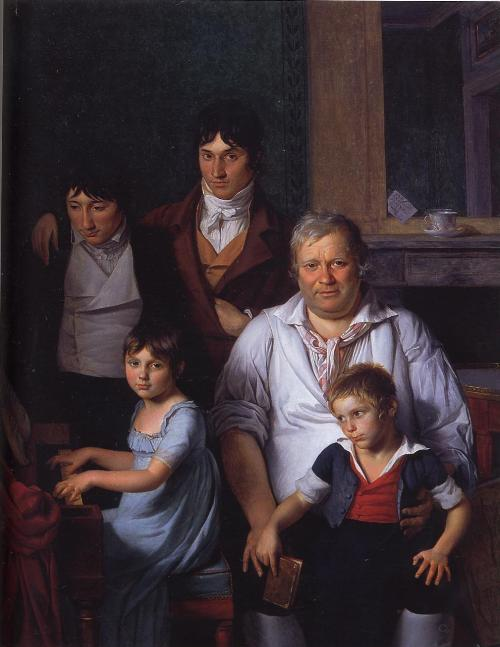
- Artist: Anonymous (circle of David)
- Year: Early 19th century
- Catalogue: 10,288
- Medium: Oil on canvas
- Movement: Neoclassicism
- Dimensions: 157 cm × 125 cm (62 in × 49 in)
- Location: Musée de Tessé, Le Mans

Portrait of a Man and His Children is an early 19th-century group portrait in oil and canvas by an unknown artist, now in the Musée de Tessé in Le Mans, France.

== Title and attribution ==
It was formerly titled The Convention Member Michel Gérard and His Family or Portrait of a Convention Member's Family. It returned to public view late in the 19th century, at which time it was attributed to Jacques-Louis David, for example by the art historians Charles Saunier in 1903 and Raymond Escholier in 1936. That attribution is now rejected since its style (for instance its precise attention to detail) is not that of David at that period. Various alternative artists have been suggested, such as Martin Drolling and François-Joseph Navez, but none of these have been conclusively accepted.

== History ==
It is recorded in the collection of the member of parliament Abel Vautier in 1861 in Le Magasin pittoresque with the title Gérard as a Father with His Family (le Père Gérard et sa famille). It was sold on 9 December 1863 by Vautier's heirs. Philippe de Saint-Albin left it to its present owner in 1879 as The Family of Michel Gérard. It was lent to a David exhibition in 1913, where Louis Dimier wrote of it:

The portrait of the Gérard family ([catalogue number] 50), lent by the Museum of Le Mans, a famous piece equal to Ingres's Portrait of Monsieur Bertin, is a work by David during a moment that he was torn from the system, practicing the art of grouping and of effect, even rediscovering (especially in the half-tones) a certain beauty of execution. It is a masterpiece, but only of its kind.

== Sources ==
- Allard, Sébastien; Scherf, Guilhem, eds. (2006). Portraits publics, portraits privés: 1770–1830 (in French). Paris: Réunion des Musées nationaux. p. 47. ISBN 9782711852246.
- Charles, Robert (1880). "Les acquisitions du musée de peinture au Mans". Revue Historique et Archéologique du Maine (in French). 8: 331–334.
- Escholier, Raymond (1936). Gros ses amis et ses élèves (in French). Paris: Librairie Floury.
- Saunier, Charles (1903). Louis David, biographie critique (in French). Paris: Henri Laurens.
