= Allegory of Painting (Le Mans) =

Painting attributed to Artemisia Gentileschi

An Allegory of Painting
- Allegory of Painting (Artemisia Gentileschi)
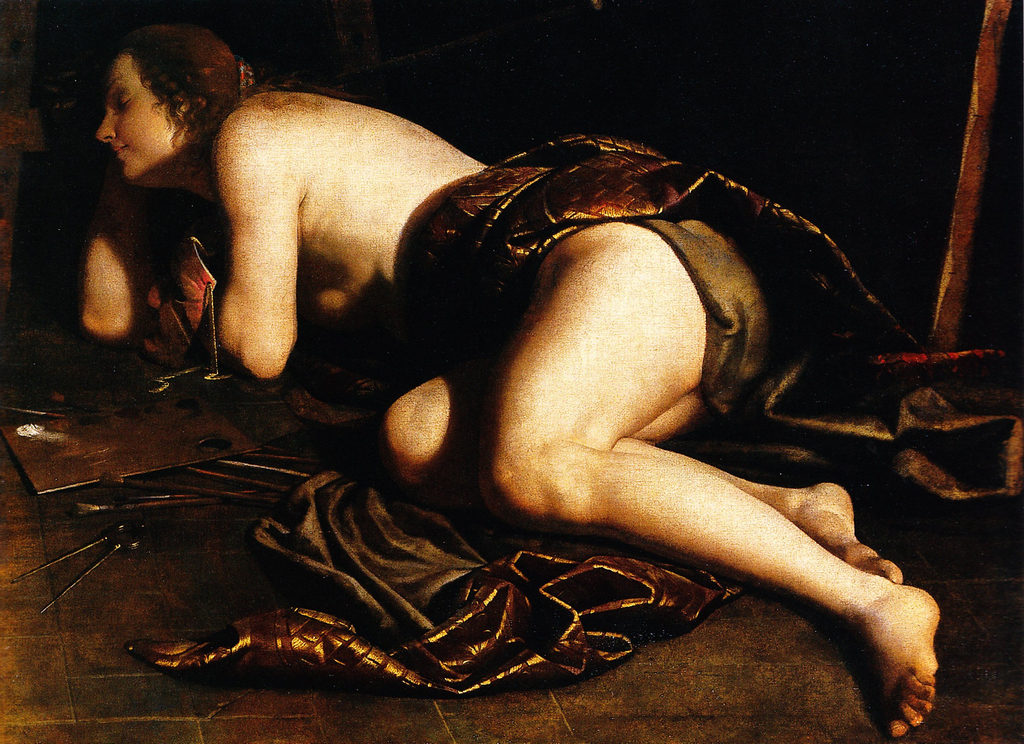
- Artist: First attributed to Artemisia Gentileschi (1988), currently attributed to an anonymous Neapolitan painter, 1640s
- Year: 1640s
- Medium: Oil on canvas
- Dimensions: 95.7 cm (37.7 in) × 132.6 cm (52.2 in)
- Location: Musée de Tessé
- Identifiers: Joconde work ID: 07700000071

The Allegory of Painting is a painting from around the 1640s attributed in 1988 to the Italian Baroque artist Artemisia Gentileschi, although more recent research suggests it was painted by an anonymous Neapolitan painter in the mid-17th century. It is now in the Musée de Tessé, Le Mans, France.

== Description ==
A nude woman lies on her side, apparently asleep, with her midsection partially covered by drapery. She is surrounded by the tools of an artist, such as a palette, drawing compass and brushes as well as a mask, symbolic of imitation. Analysis of x-rays revealed another image under the left arm - a bishop wearing a mitre.

== Provenance ==
It was first documented in the Popeliniere family, from whom it was acquired by the present owners in 1836.

== Attribution ==
It could be another of several paintings by Gentileschi with this subject, but the depiction in this particular painting is unusual, and scholars have debated the meaning and attribution. Bissell saw the depiction as too crude to be the work of Artemisia; he instead viewed it as an insult to the family of Orazio Gentileschi, her father, by the hand of his adversary Giovanni Baglione. Keith Christiansen supported the attribution to Artemisia, relating it to other works of hers from the same period.

== See also ==
- List of works by Artemisia Gentileschi

== Sources ==
- Bissell, R. Ward (1999). Artemisia Gentileschi and the Authority of Art : Critical Reading and Catalogue Raisonné. University Park, Pa.: Pennsylvania State University Press. ISBN 0-271-01787-2. OCLC 1008129172.
- Christiansen, Keith; Mann, Judith Walker (2001). Orazio and Artemisia Gentileschi. New York; New Haven: Metropolitan Museum of Art ; Yale University Press. ISBN 1588390063.
