= Hôpital Etoc-Demazy =

Psychiatric hospital in France

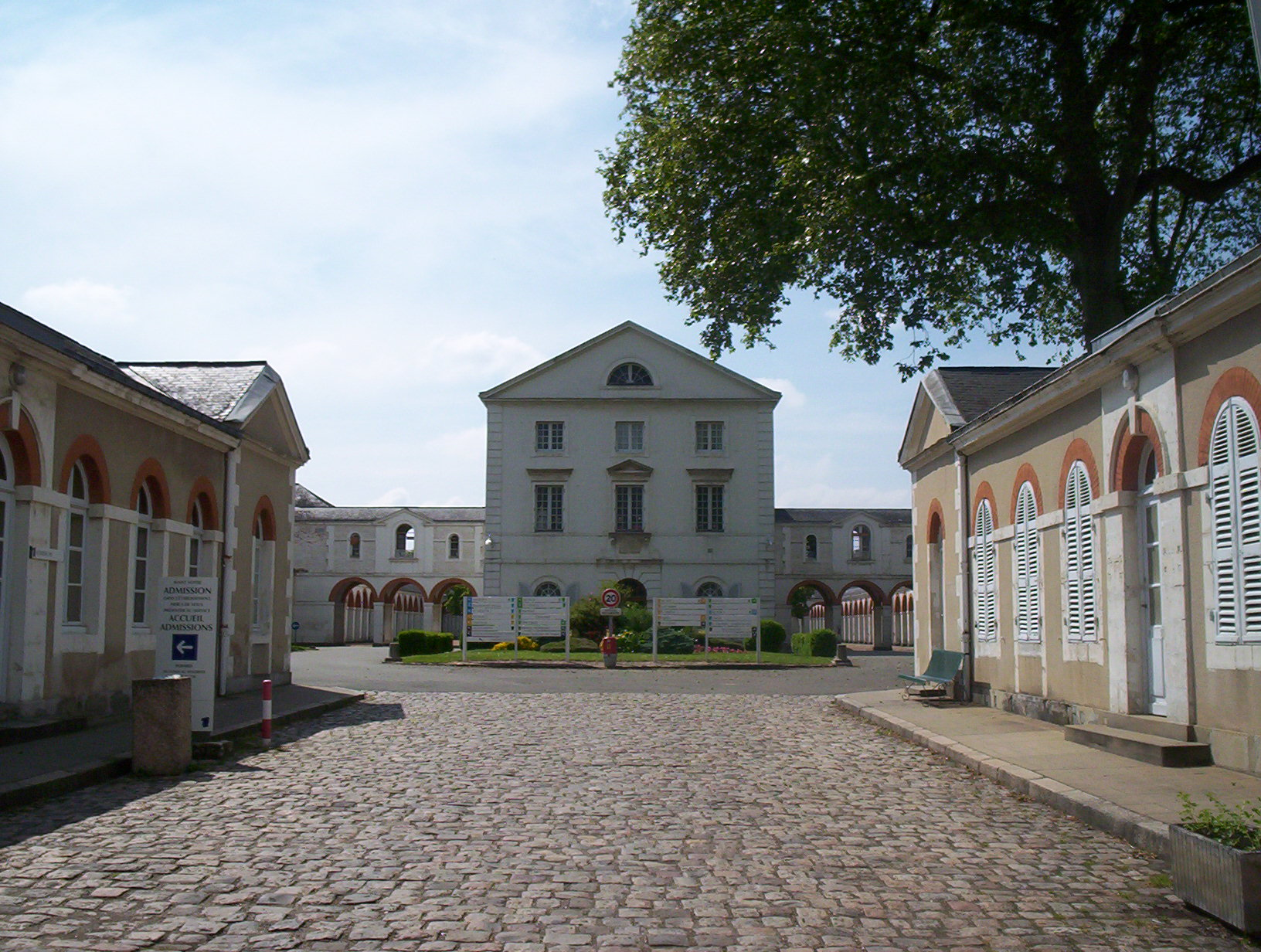
Entrance.

The hôpital Etoc-Demazy is a historic psychiatric hospital in the Novaxis or Gare Sud district of Le Mans, France, named after Gustave Etoc-Demazy.

It was opened in 1828 and it was closed in 2011 after its work was transferred to the hôpital d'Allonnes in the Mancelle agglomeration. The buildings are of historical importance for the city and so the Ministry of Culture began a study to add it to the base mérimée, but this was cancelled. It was made a monument historique in 2001.

== Bibliography ==
- (in French) Hervé Guillemain, Chronique de la psychiatrie ordinaire. Patients, soignants et institutions en Sarthe du XIXe siècle au XXIe siècle, Le Mans, Editions de la Reinette, 2010.
