= Allegory of Painting and Sculpture =

Painting by Guercino

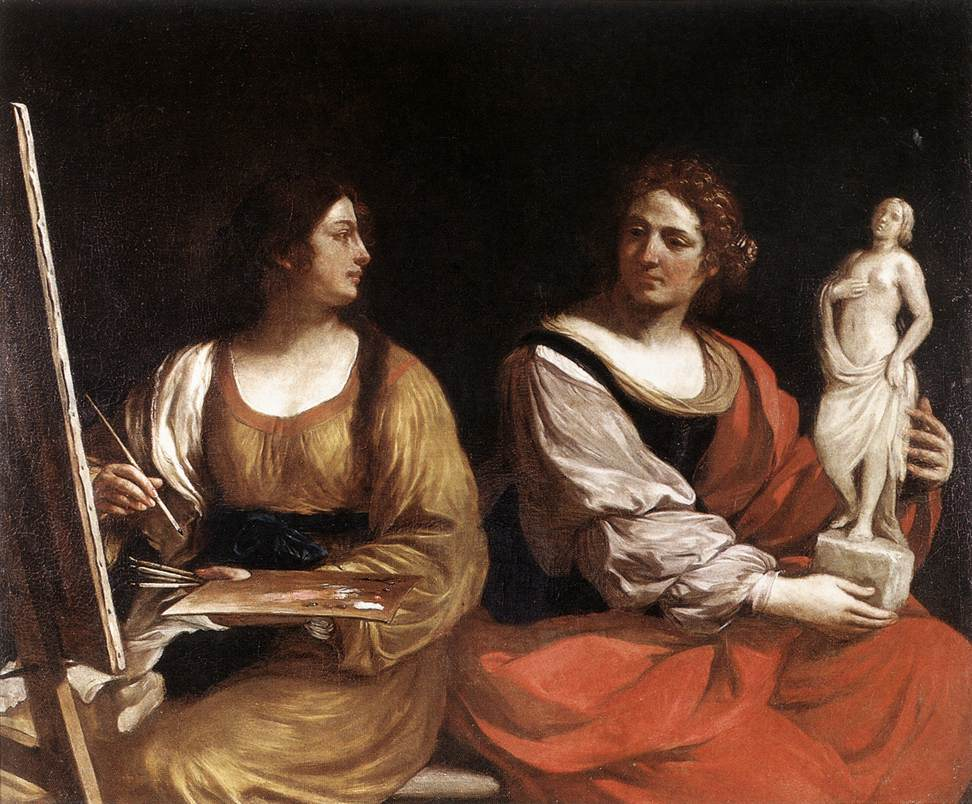
Allegory of Painting and Sculpture (1637) by Guercino

Allegory of Painting and Sculpture is a 1637 oil-on-canvas painting by the Italian Baroque artist Guercino, which was part of the Colonna collection until 1802 and then in 1892 formed part of the Torlonia donation to the Galleria Nazionale d'Arte Antica in Rome, where it still resides.
