= Marie-Anne-Julie Forestier =

French painter

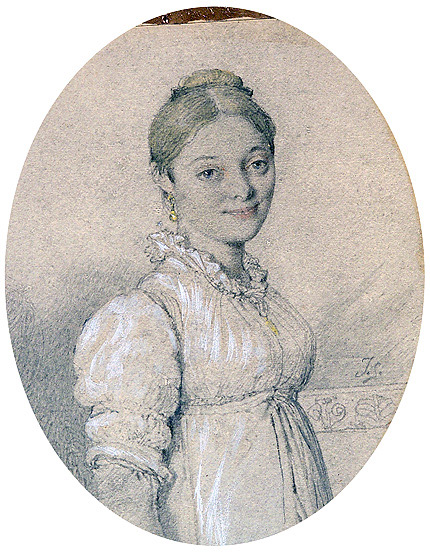
Medallion portrait of Julie Forestier, 1806, by Ingres

Marie-Anne-Julie Forestier (Paris, 13 June 1782 – Choisy-le-Roi, 26 February 1853) was a French painter.

== Life ==
Born in Paris, she became a pupil of Jacques-Louis David and in June 1806 became engaged to Jean-Dominique Ingres. However, Ingres left for Rome that September and the engagement did not survive until his return to France, since he won the first prize for painting in 1801 and thus had to stay in Rome.

She exhibited at the Paris Salons of 1802, 1810, 1812, 1814 and 1819. Her works include a portrait of Philippe Pinel with his family and a copy of Ingres' Self-Portrait Aged 24 - the latter is now in the musée Ingres in Montauban.

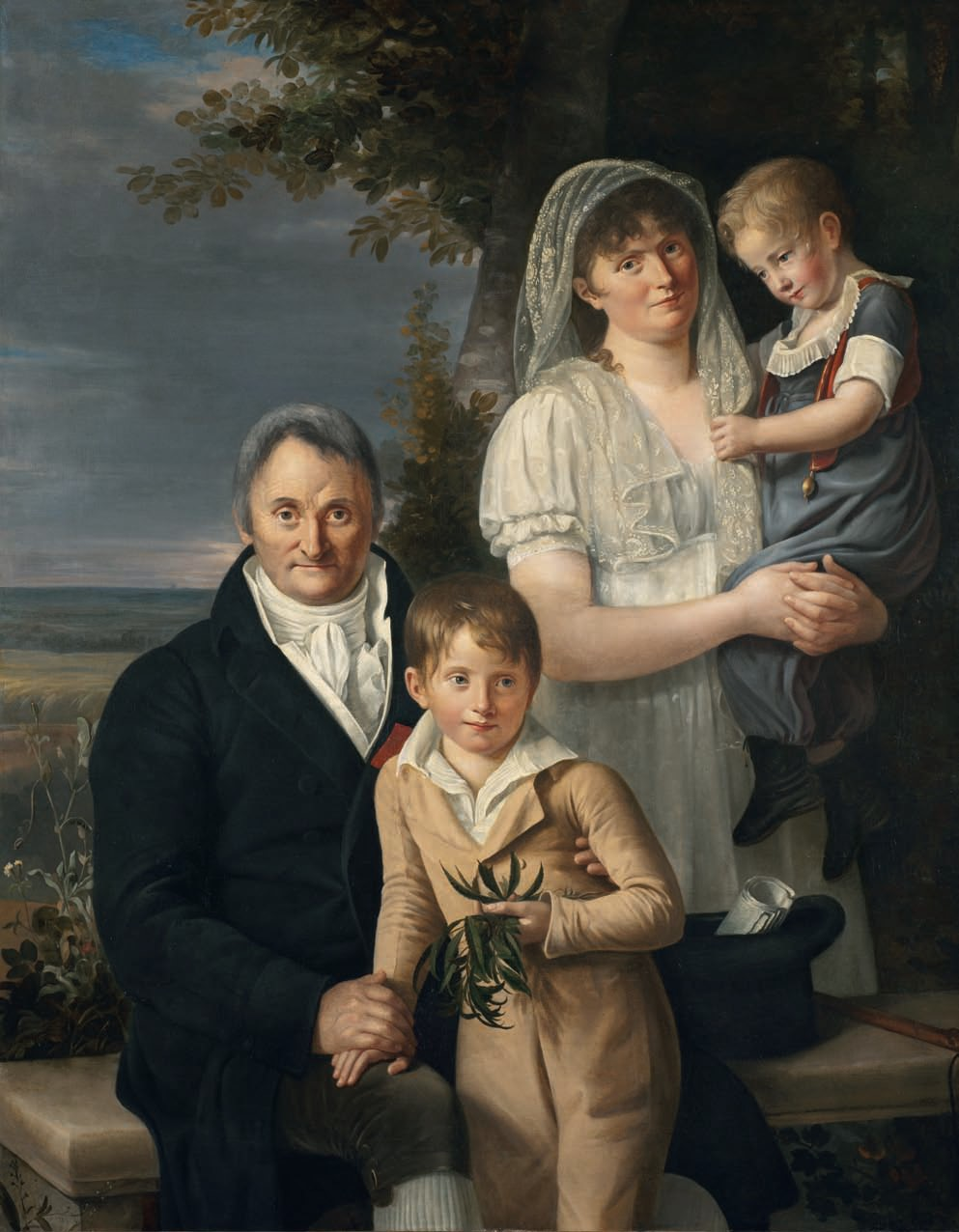
Philippe Pinel and his family, 1807

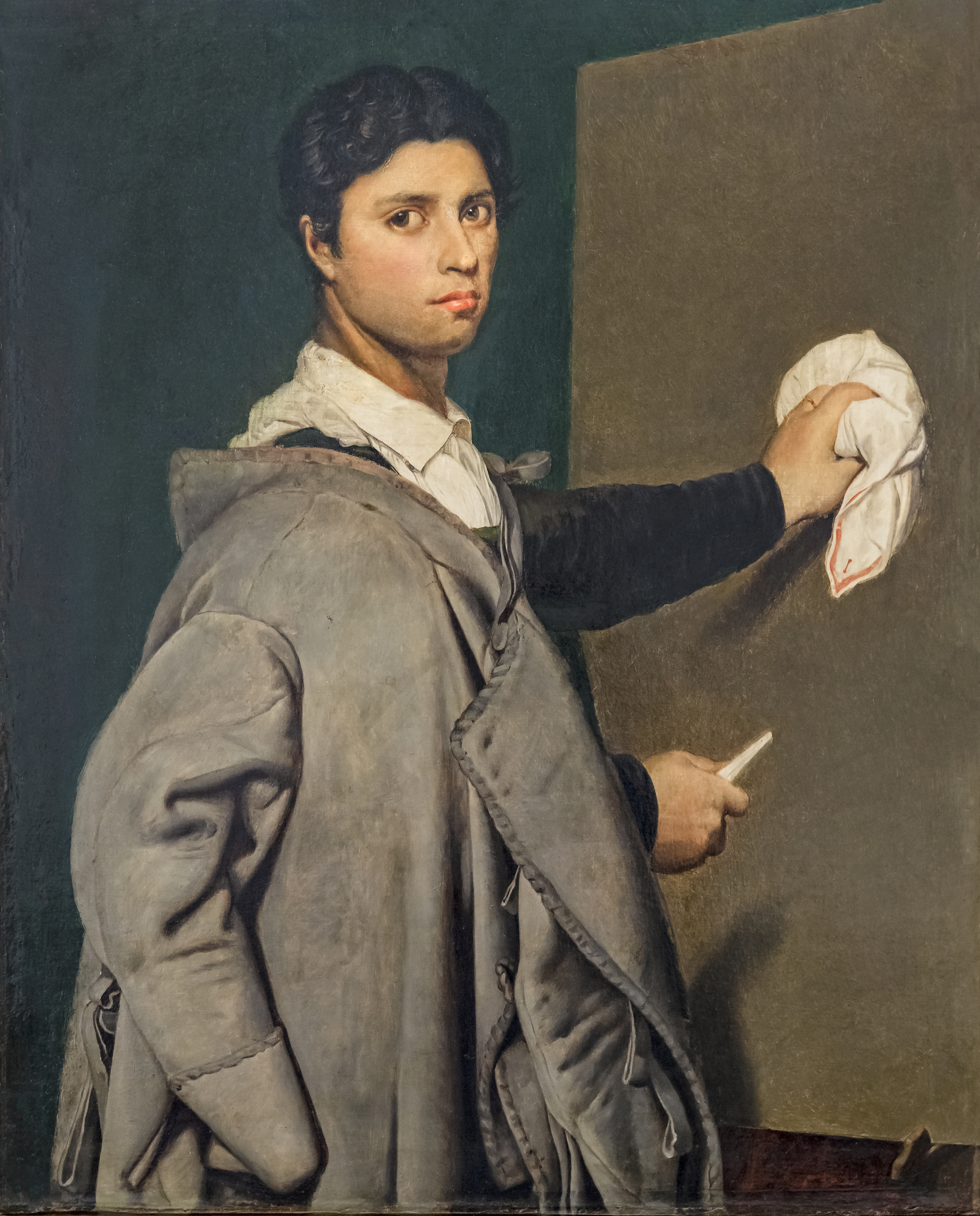
Copy of the Self-portrait of Ingres, 1807, by Forestier

== Bibliography ==
- (in French) Henry Lapauze, Le Roman d'amour de M. Ingres, Paris, 1910, p. 199-242.

== Sources ==
- Birth record for Forestier
- http://www.latribunedelart.com/julie-forestier-par-ingres---ingres-par-julie-forestier-article00479.html
