= Le Mans Archaeological and Historical Museum =

Historical museum in Le Mans, France

Museum of Archaeology and History of Maine
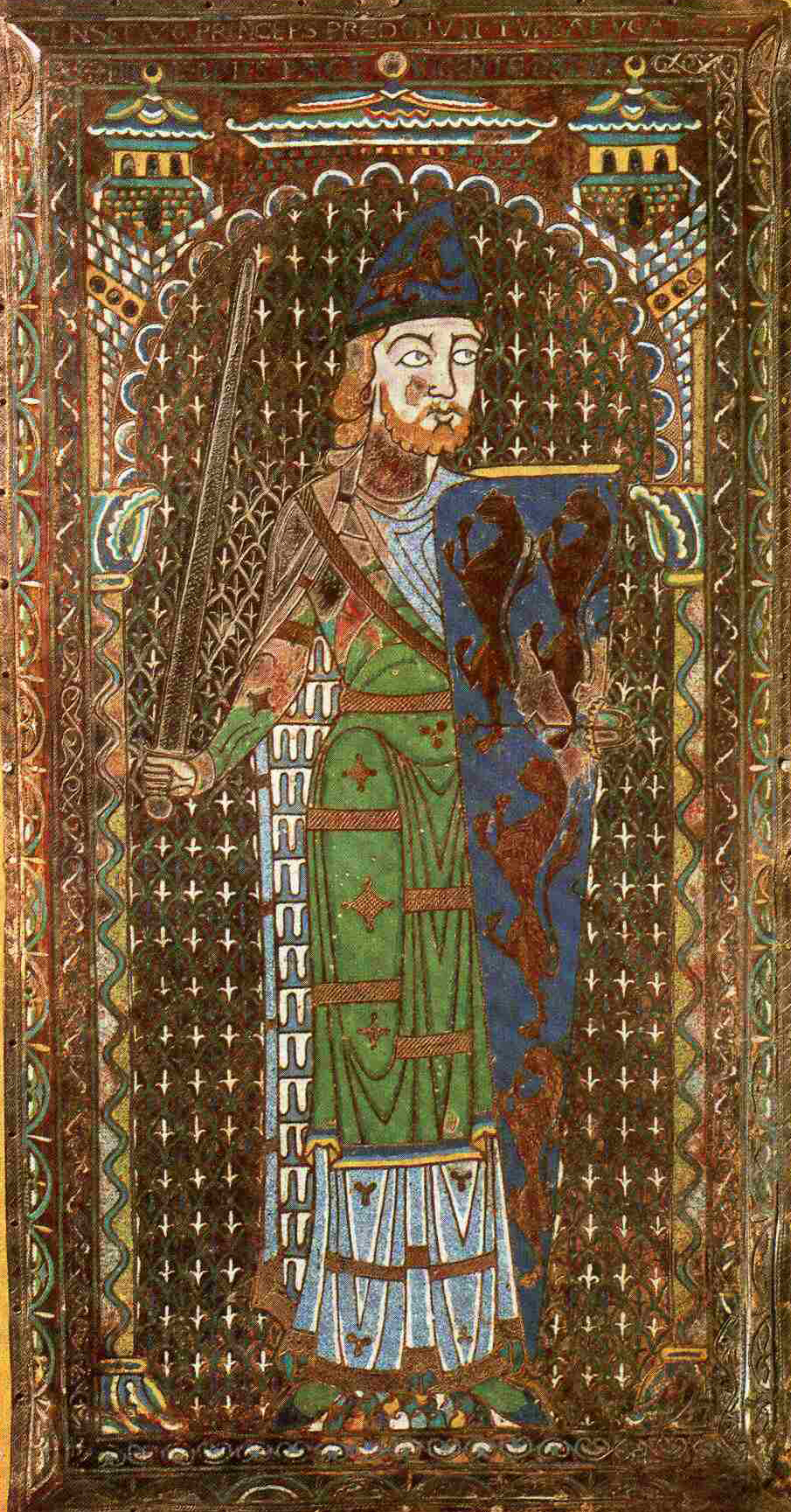
- The Plantagenet enamel, one of the works preserved at the Carré Plantagenêt Museum.
- Established: June 19, 2009
- Location: Le Mans, France
- Coordinates: 48°00′26″N 0°11′53″E
- Type: Archaeology museum
- Collections: Archeological Collections of Maine

The Le Mans Archaeological and Historical Museum, officially known as the Jean-Claude-Boulard Carré Plantagenêt Museum, is located in Le Mans, in the Saint-Nicolas district near the city center. Following a complete restoration and redesign led by architect Bernard Althabegoity, the museum was inaugurated on 19 June 2009 and opened to the public the next day. It houses the local archaeological collections formerly in the Musée de Tessé.

== History ==
Le Mans was among the first cities in France to establish a museum after the French Revolution. Opened to the public on 21 June 1799 with free access, it was initially housed in the galleries of the Abbey of La Couture, now the seat of the Sarthe prefecture. A large part of its collections originated from Marshal de Tessé, whose family dispersed them during the Revolutionary period. This institution, initially devoted to fine arts, later became the Tessé Museum.

Within the French Archaeological Society, particularly under the influence of Arcisse de Caumont, the study of historic monuments developed through the sessions of the List of sessions of the Archaeological Congresses of France and the Bulletin monumental, alongside growing efforts toward their preservation. In the Sarthe department, the administrative commission for historic monuments, under List of prefects of Sarthe Eugène Mancel, proposed the creation of a museum or repository to safeguard ancient objects threatened with destruction. Charles Drouet (1779–1862), an ironmaster at Sainte-Jamme-sur-Sarthe, as well as a naturalist, antiquarian, general councillor of the Sarthe (1833–1848), and divisional inspector for the French Society of Archaeology, initiated the formation of an eight-member commission that included Eugène Hucher. In 1844, this commission met with List of mayors of Le Mans Pierre Piédor to plan the establishment of a museum devoted to historic monuments. On 4 June 1846, the mayor of Le Mans, Auguste Trotté de la Roche, formally decided to create a Museum of Historic Monuments and appointed a ten-member commission to organize it. Following a report by the surveyor-architect Lhommedé, the mayor and the municipal council chose to install the museum in the basement of the municipal theatre, opposite the cathedral. In the same year, the General Council of the Sarthe granted a subsidy to the Society for the Conservation of Monuments to support the creation of the museum, while the society itself contributed funds for the acquisition and transport of the funerary statues of the viscounts of Beaumont. Charles Drouet became the museum's first director and remained in office until 22 November 1862, when he was succeeded by Eugène Hucher, who had been appointed assistant curator in 1859. On 14 March 1876, Ferdinand Hucher, his son, was appointed assistant curator, at which time the institution was designated for the first time as the Archaeological Museum of the City of Le Mans. He later became curator following his father's death. From 1883 onward, a new location for the museum was sought. After negotiations with Denis Darcy, chief architect of historic monuments, it was decided to transfer the collections to the crypt of the former collegiate church of Saint-Pierre-la-Cour. The move took place in 1903, following restoration work. Ferdinand Hucher died on 19 July 1903, and Joseph Morancé, surveyor-architect of the city of Le Mans, was appointed curator of the museum.

The Archaeological Museum of Le Mans was abolished in 1940, and most of the works were then stored at the Tessé Museum, in storage, or at the museum of Allonnes on display. The Carré Plantagenêt, the museum of archaeology and history of Le Mans, was inaugurated on 18 June 2009 in the former buildings of the convent of the Filles-Dieu, which housed nuns living under the Rule of Saint Augustine. This convent was closed in the eighteenth century and used as a hospital-seminary for elderly and indigent priests. The buildings were sold as national property during the Revolution. Part of the buildings was purchased by the printer Charles Monnoyer. The museum presents objects and remains from recent excavations ranging from Prehistory to the Middle Ages, making it possible to discover local ways of life and history.

== Carré Plantagenêt ==
=== The building ===
The museum is located on the site of the former Monnoyer printing house, opposite the Palace of the Counts of Maine, on ground previously occupied by a medieval convent. Designed by architect Bernard Althabegoïty, the building provides 3,360 square meters of floor space, including 1,400 square meters for permanent collections and 300 square meters for temporary exhibitions. It also includes a 120-seat auditorium combining historic masonry with modern technical facilities. The museum was inaugurated on 19 June 2009.

=== Collections ===
The museum is composed of five distinct sections including works, permanent collections, and explanatory models corresponding to the following five periods:

- prehistoric times;
- protohistory;
- our Gallo-Roman ancestors;
- the early Middle Ages;
- medieval Maine.

The museum's collections include several major works, notably the Treasure of Sablons-Bords-de-l'Huisne, the Shroud of Saint-Bertrand, the Plantagenet enamel, and the Coëffort silver treasure. One of the galleries displays six recumbent effigies, four of which originate from the former Abbey of Étival-en-Charnie.

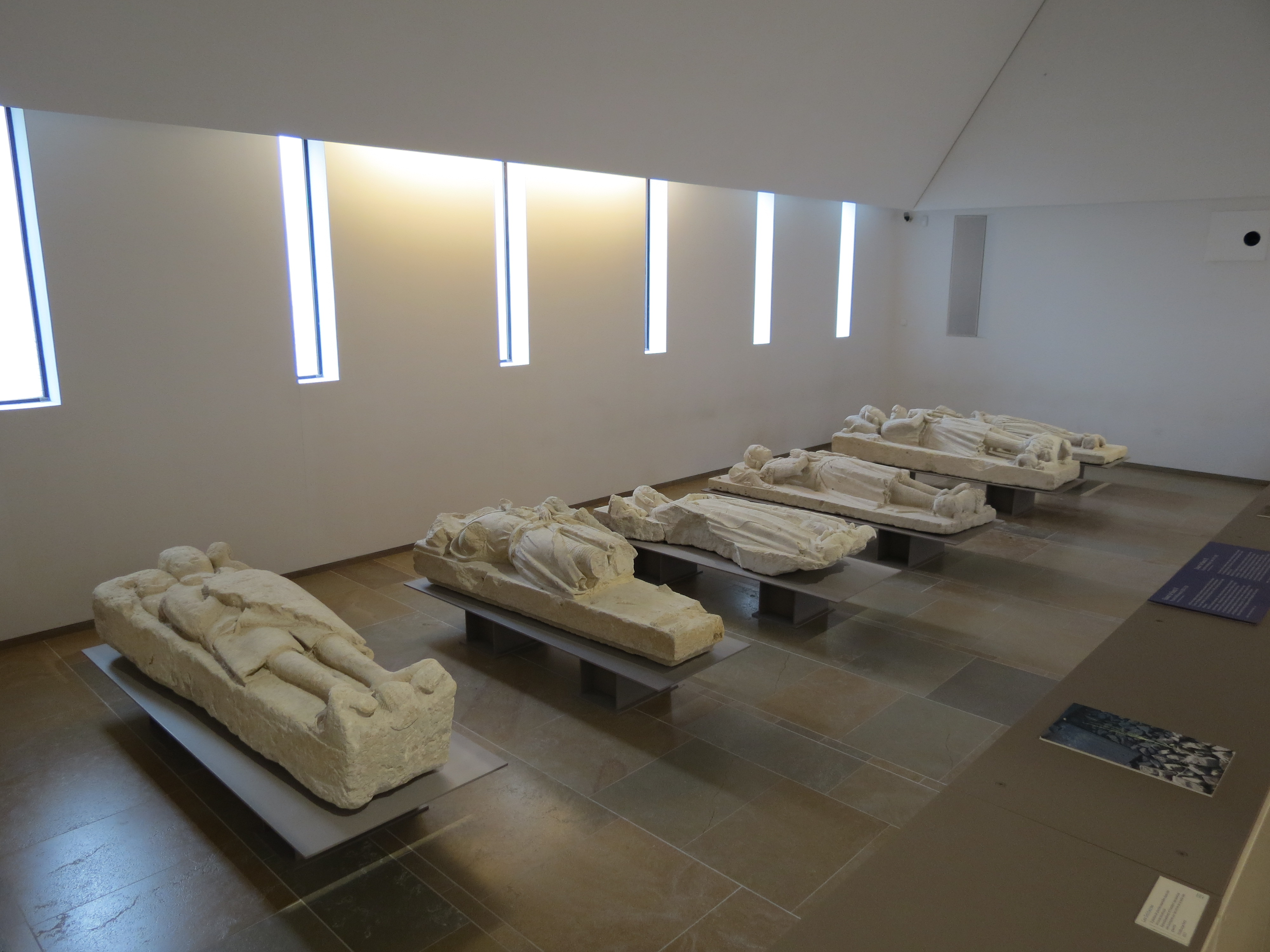
Hall of Recumbent Statues

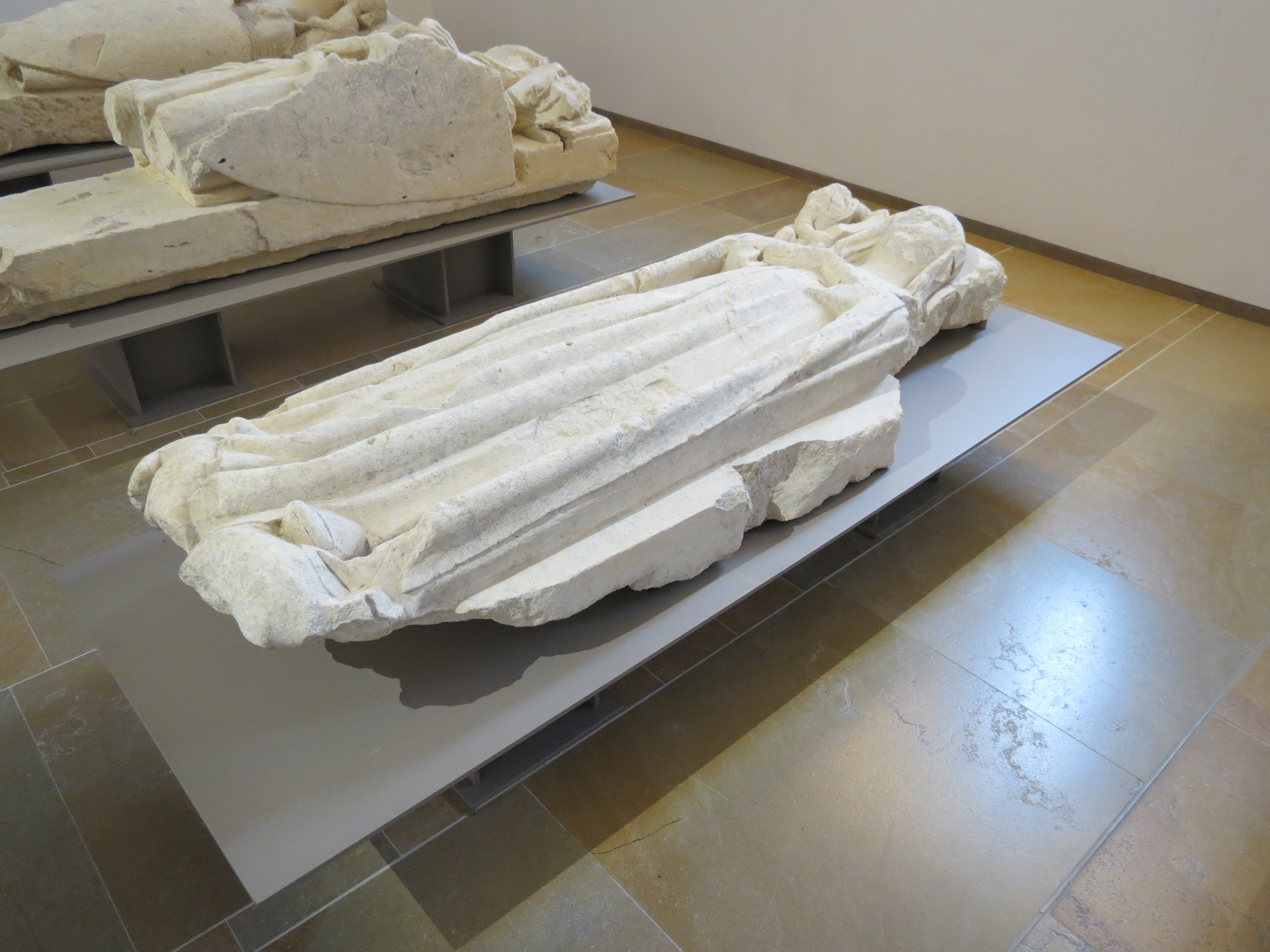
Recumbent statue of Agnes (c. 1250-1306), Viscountess of Beaumont

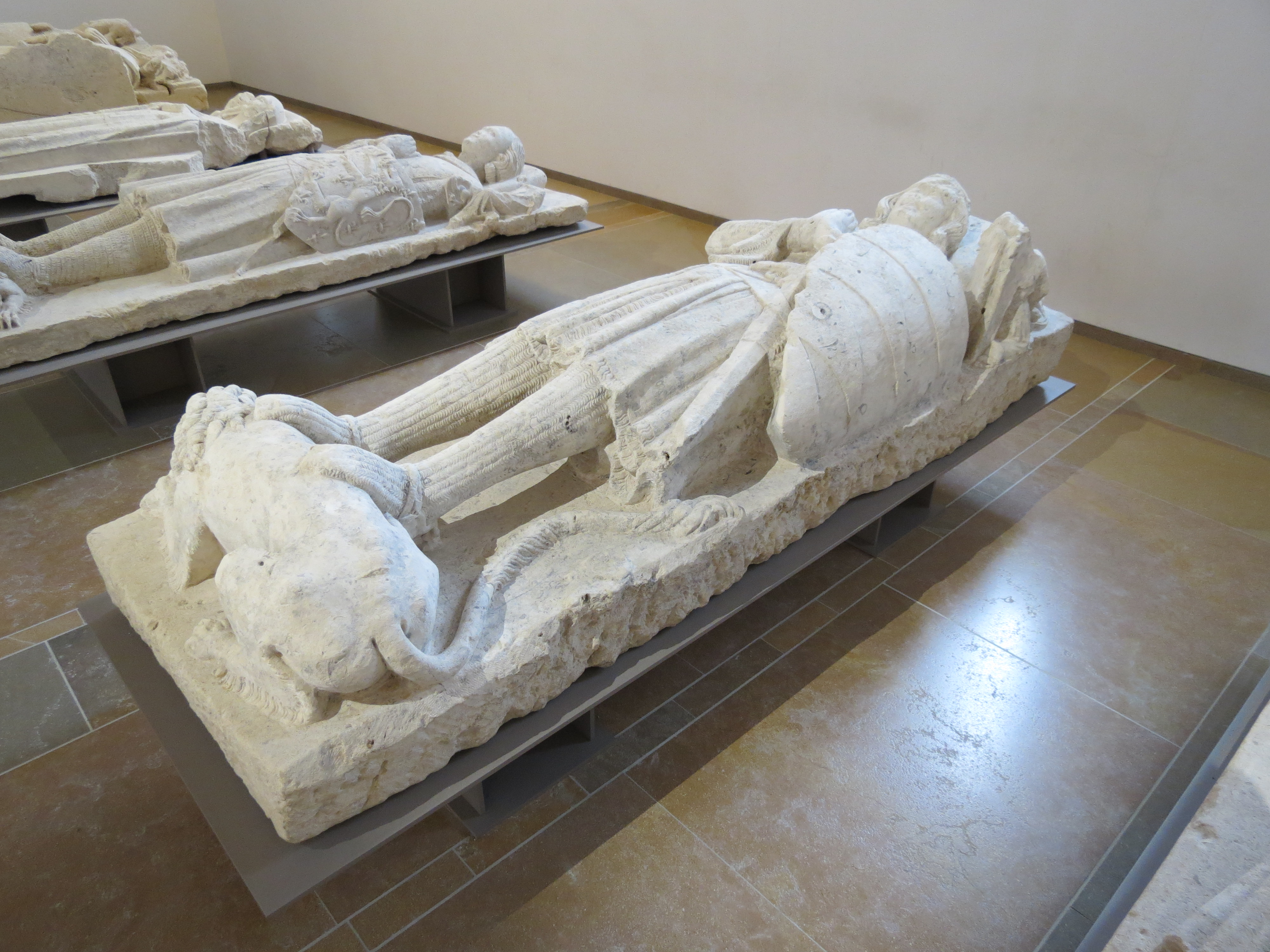
Recumbent statue of Jean de Maule, knight who died in 1323

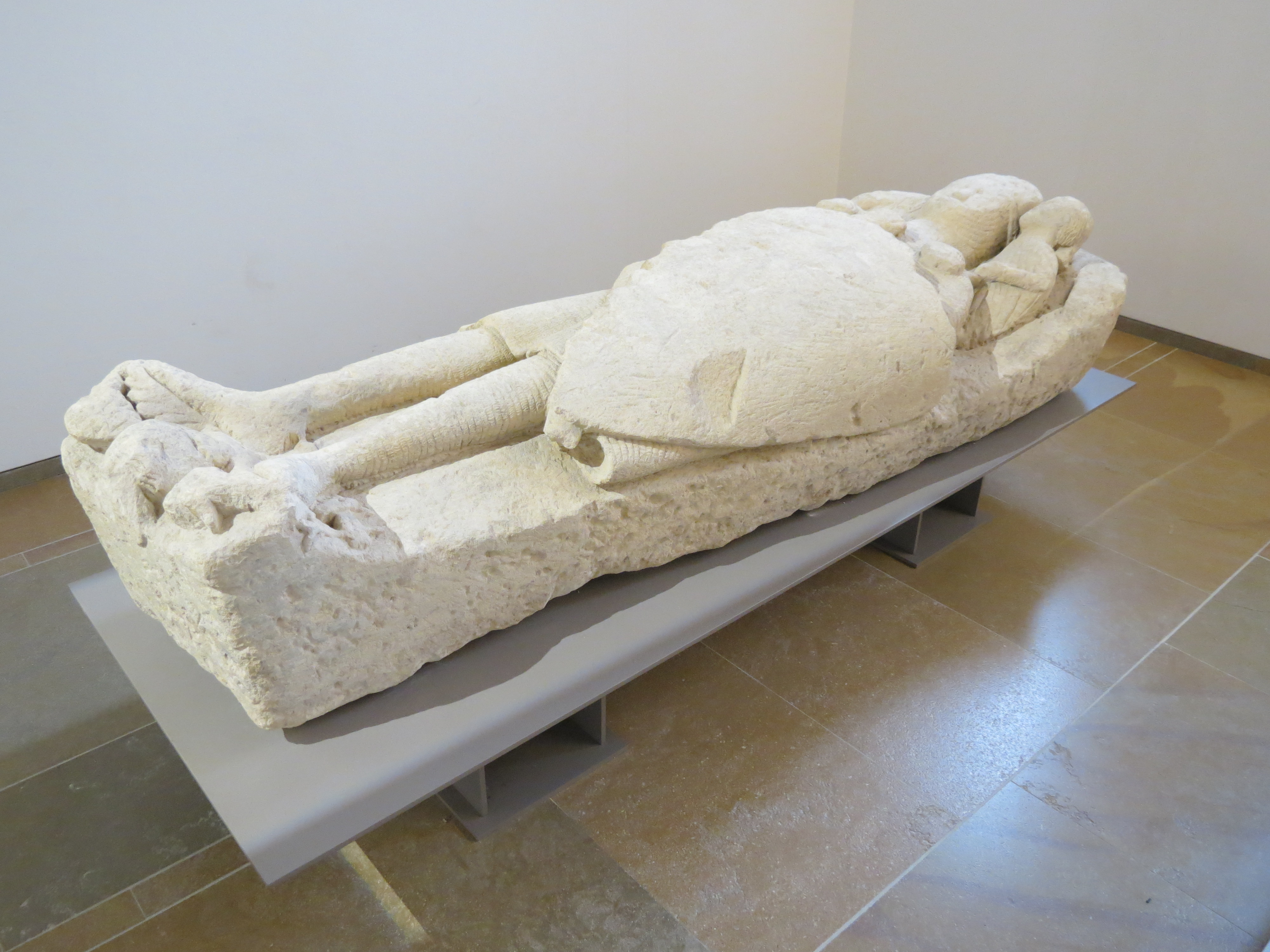
Recumbent statue of Raoul V (1093-1133), Viscount of Beaumont

=== Accessibility ===
The Jacobins serve the Carré Plantagenêt–Quinconces stop on Line T2 of the Le Mans tramway.

== See also ==
- Le Mans
- Abbey of Saint-Pierre de la Couture

== Bibliography ==
- La vie mancelle et sarthoise [Life in Le Mans and the Sarthe region] (in French). 2008.
