= Jullien =

Jullien is a French surname. Notable people with the surname include:

- André Jullien (1766–1832), French vintner
- André-Damien-Ferdinand Jullien (1882–1964), French cardinal
- Bernard Jullien (1798–1881), French linguist and academic
- Christopher Jullien (born 1993), French footballer
- François Jullien (born 1951), French Sinologist
- Frédéric Benoît Victoire Jullien (1785–1825), French cavalry officer
- Gilles Jullien (c.1651/53–1703), French Baroque composer and organist
- Huguette Jullien, French curler
- Jacques Jullien (1929–2012), French Roman Catholic archbishop
- Jos Jullien (1877–1956), French painter
- Louis Antoine Jullien (1812–1860), French conductor and composer of light music
- Marc-Antoine Jullien (1744-1821), French educator and politician
- Marc-Antoine Jullien de Paris (called Jullien fils), French revolutionary
- Rosalie Jullien (), wife of Marc-Antoine senior
- Thomas Prosper Jullien (1773–1798), French army officer

== See also ==
- Julienne (disambiguation)
- Louis Joseph Victor Jullien de Bidon (1764–1839), French army officer and nobleman
- Jullien's Golden Carp or Probarbus jullieni, a species of freshwater fish
