= Saint-Cyr Nugues =

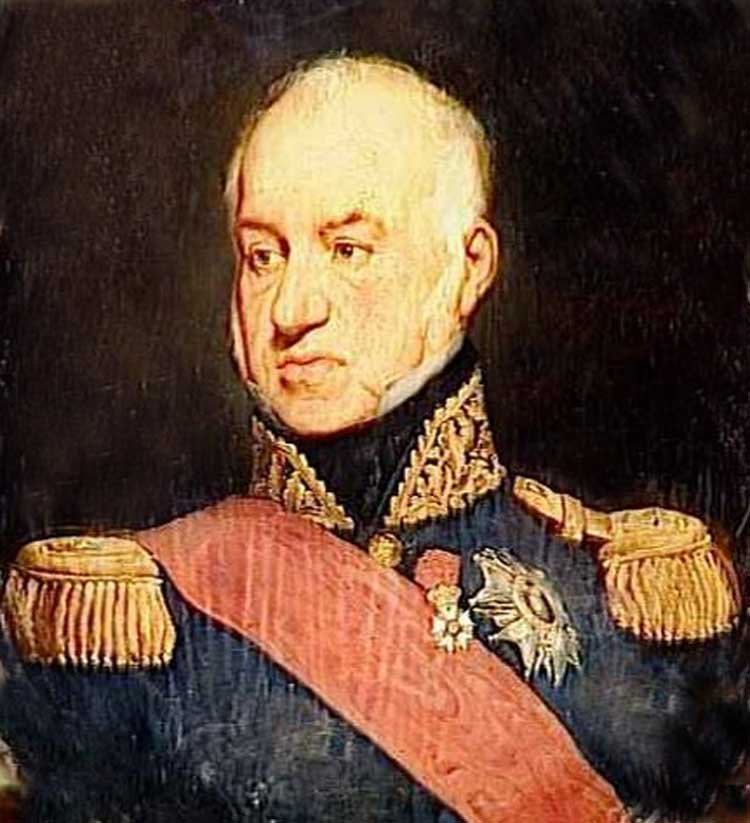
- 19th-century portrait of him by Ary Scheffer, château de Versailles.
- Nickname: « Cyr Nugues »
- Born: 18 October 1774; Romans, Drôme
- Died: 25 July 1842 (aged 67) Vichy, Allier
- Allegiance: France (First Republic, First Empire, Kingdom)
- Branch: infantry
- Service years: 1791-1840
- Rank: Lieutenant-general
- Conflicts: Austerlitz; Lérida; Valencia; Tarragona; Antwerp
- Awards: Baron of the Empire; Grand-Cross of the Legion of Honour; Knight of the Order of Saint-Louis; Peer of France

Saint-Cyr Nugues (18 October 1774 – 25 July 1842) was a French general during the French Revolutionary Wars, Napoleonic Wars and the Hundred Days.

His name is engraved on column 39 of the Arc de Triomphe in Paris.

== Life ==
=== Early life ===
He was born in Romans and baptised on the day of his birth in that town's church of Saint-Barnard. He was one of nine children born to wine and textile merchant Claude Étienne Nugues and his wife Charlotte Enfantin.

=== Revolution ===
After studying at the collège de Navarre, he won first prize in the general competition. In 1791, he joined the 8th la Drôme Volunteer Battalion, in which an elder brother was already a captain. He was made a sergeant but had to leave the army due to sight problems and instead became an assistant commissioner for war in October 1792. This allowed him to be part of the armée des Pyrénées in 1792–1793, then part of the army staff of the armée d'Italie.

Between 21 November 1793 and 15 October 1794, during the Reign of Terror, he was director of the offices of the Committee for Public Safety, coordinating and overseeing the imposing bureaucratic machinery which swelled and swelled as the Committee's prerogatives expanded. At its largest, in Year II, its fifty-four offices in twelve sections had almost 400 employees. He gained this role as he was a close friend of Marc-Antoine Jullien, eldest son of Marc-Antoine and Rosalie Jullien, who had become Robespierre's agent for the Grand Ouest.

On 18 September 1799 he rejoined the army as a temporary sub-lieutenant back on the staff of the armée d'Italie, with that rank confirmed on 2 May 1800. He became a temporary lieutenant on 11 December 1800, a temporary captain on 28 January 1801 and a full captain on 28 July 1801. He became aide de camp to general Suchet on 2 January 1802 and accompanied him into the Army of the Coasts of the Ocean.

=== Empire and Hundred Days ===
He stayed with Suchet on his move into the Grande Armée, took part in several campaigns in Germany and Poland and the battles of Austerlitz, Iena and Pultusk. On 2 January 1807 he was promoted to chef de bataillon and then to assistant-commander on 22 October 1808.

In 1808 he was always beside general Suchet as his chief of chief whilst the latter was head of 5th Corps in the Armée d'Espagne. Saint-Cyr Nugues gained distinction at Lérida (29 April – 14 May 1810), negotiated the surrender of Tortosa and took part in the assault on the Francoli fort (7 June 1811) during the siege of Tarragona. On 13 July 1811 he was made a baron of the empire, then promoted to brigadier general on 6 August the same year.

He also fought bravely at the Siege of Valencia from 26 December 1811 to 9 January 1812. He became chief of staff to the Army of Aragon and Catalonia in 1813 and appreciated the assistance sent by the Kingdom of Naples under generals Severoli and Bertoletti. The restored monarchy made him a knight of the Order of Saint Louis on 27 June 1814, but the following year he rejoined marshal Suchet in the Armée des Alpes during Napoleon's Hundred Days. He was finally placed on the non-active list on 1 October 1815.

=== 1816–1842 ===
After twenty years' service, the second restoration of the French monarchy allowed him to retire and return to Romans. From December 1816 to November 1821 he was mayor of Chanos-Curson near Romans and during that time, in 1818, he was made head of a commission repairing France's border defences. It made its suggestions later in 1818 but these were only adopted in 1830. He joined the Spanish Expedition as chief of staff to general Jacques Alexandre Law de Lauriston on 18 June 1823, fighting at the Siege of Pamplona that September and rising to lieutenant general on 18 November the same year.

When the Belgian Revolution broke out in 1830 France's Minister for War ordered Nugues to join the Siege of Antwerp as chief of staff to marshal Gérard. He was wounded by a shell blast on the night of 19 December 1832 but was rewarded for his services by being made a Peer of France on 26 January the following year and director of personnel for military operations at the Ministry of War on 30 July 1834, where he set up several commissions.

On 6 February 1836, at the request of Adolphe Thiers, Nugues produced the first list of 384 names to be engraved on the Arc de Triomphe, himself being placed in the reserve section on 31 January 1840. He died in 1842 in Vichy He was initially buried in the cemetery in Vichy before his remains were moved to his birthplace of Romans in 1968.

== Honours ==
- Légion d'honneur
  - Knight - 16 August 1807
  - Officer - 18 July 1809
  - Commander - 23 August 1814
  - Grand Officer - 2 November 1823
  - Grand Cross - 9 January 1833
- Order of Saint-Louis
  - Knight - 27 June 1814
- Order of Saint Stanislaus (Russian Empire), Knight, 2nd class
- Order of Leopold (Belgium), Grand Cross
- Chevalier de l'Empire, by letters patent on 18 August 1810
- Baron de l'Empire, by an imperial decree of 2 March 1811 and letters patent of 13 July 1811

== Bibliography ==
In French unless otherwise noted.

- Virginie Martin, "Archives : Saint-Cyr Hugues, le greffier de la Terreur", dans : L'Histoire, n°512, octobre 2023, pp.44-47.
- (in English) "Generals Who Served in the French Army during the Period 1789 - 1814: Eberle to Exelmans".
- "Notice no. LH/2008/9". Base Léonore (in French).
- "Thierry Pouliquen, 'Les généraux français et étrangers ayant servis [sic] dans la Grande Armée'".
- "La noblesse d'Empire".
- Six, Georges. Dictionnaire biographique des généraux & amiraux français de la Révolution et de l'Empire (1792-1814). Paris : Librairie G. Saffroy, 1934, 2 vol. p. 410-411.
