= Jean Joseph Pierre Vigoureux =

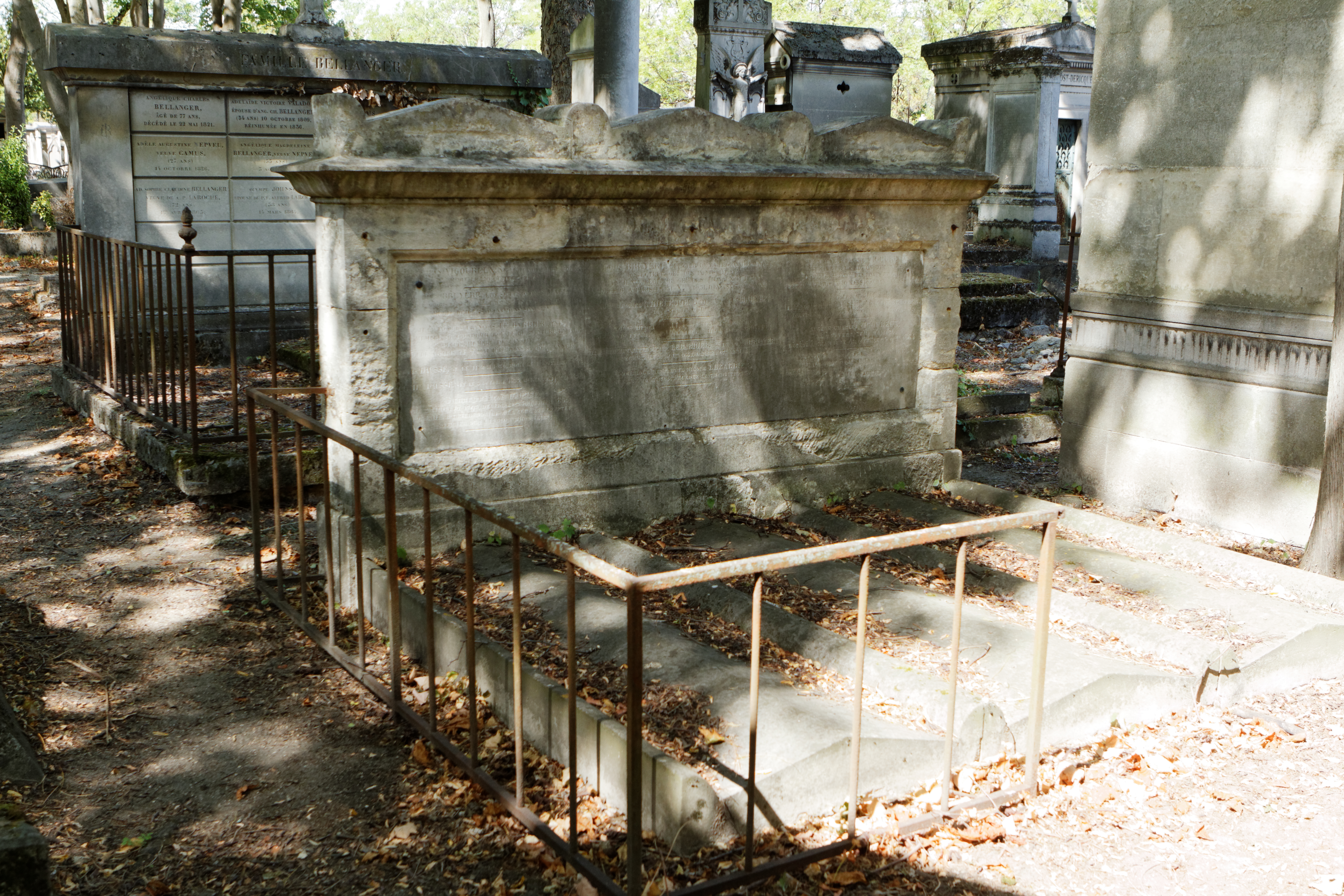
His tomb at Pere Lachaise Cemetery

Jean Joseph Pierre Vigoureux (23 March 1784 - 23 March 1874) was a French bridge and road engineer

== Life ==
He was born in Paris, 23 March 1784. He attended the École polytechnique from 22 November 1801 to 23 November 1803, during which time he and other students from the École to the Camp of Boulogne. He only spent one year at the École des ponts et chaussées before being posted to the Conseil général des ponts et chaussées, under Louis Bruyère. He was the first student of the École to be entrusted with this post.

Jean Joseph was made an 'aspirant' in 1806 and engineer second class the following year. He was put in charge of rebuilding five arches of the bridge at Saint-Cloud and to plan a bridge at Sèvres. Its construction took from 1808 to 1810. He was put in charge of engineering in the north arrondissement of the Seine from 1819 to 1824.

In 1818, he married Étiennette Jeanne Bruyère (1800-1877), daughter of Louis Bruyère - the couple had only one child, Eugène Vigoureux (1826-1864). He was made a chief engineer second class and put in charge of works on the Loire Lateral Canal in the Nièvre department. There he built two canal-bridges, the pont-canal de Digoin on the Loire and the pont-canal du Guétin on the Allier, with Adolphe Jullien as his deputy.

He was made a chief engineer director in 1838. He completed the canal and began research into improving navigation on the Loire and the Allier. He joined the conseil des ponts et chaussées in 1842 as inspector general of roads and bridges. In 1844, he was made an officer of the Legion of Honour. He retired in 1849, dying in Paris, 18 March 1857.

== Bibliography (in French) ==
- Jacques Mallet, Nécrologie. Paroles prononcées sur la tombe de M. Vigoureux, le 21 mars 1857, dans Annales des ponts et chaussées. Mémoires et documents relatifs à l'art des constructions et au service de l'ingénieur, premier semestre 1857, p. 245-247 (online)
- André Brunot, Roger Coquand, Le Corps des Ponts et Chaussées, Éditions du Centre national de la recherche scientifique, Paris, 1982, p. 176-177
