= Louis Bruyère =

French engineer

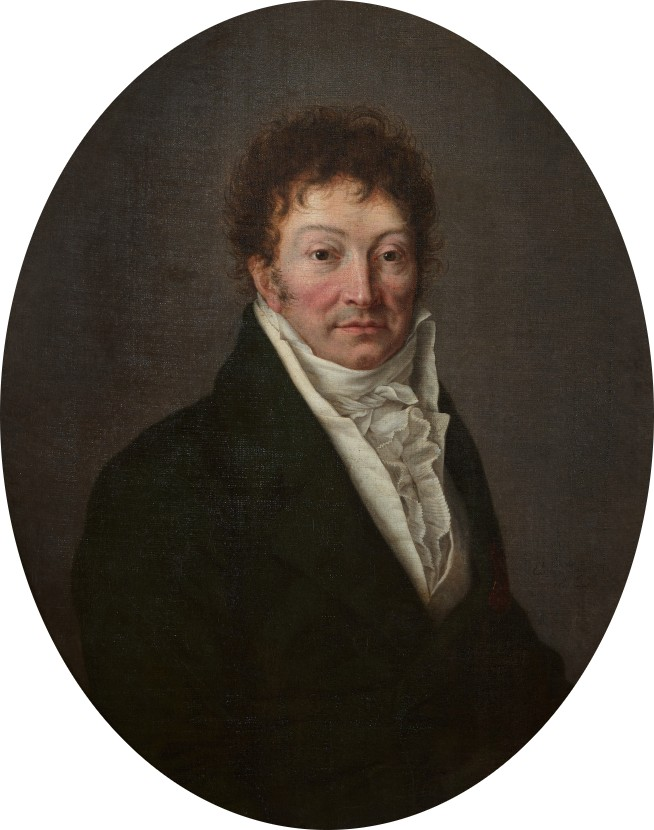
Painting of Bruyère by his wife Élise Le Barbier, c. 1809-1815 (École nationale des ponts et chaussées).

Louis Bruyère (19 May 1758 - 31 December 1831) was a French engineer. A professor at the École des ponts et chaussées, director general of Paris's public works (1809-1820), and inspector general of bridges and roads. He built the partially-underground Saint-Maur canal (1808-1811), reactivated the Machine de Marly and led many grand projects in Paris.

== Life ==
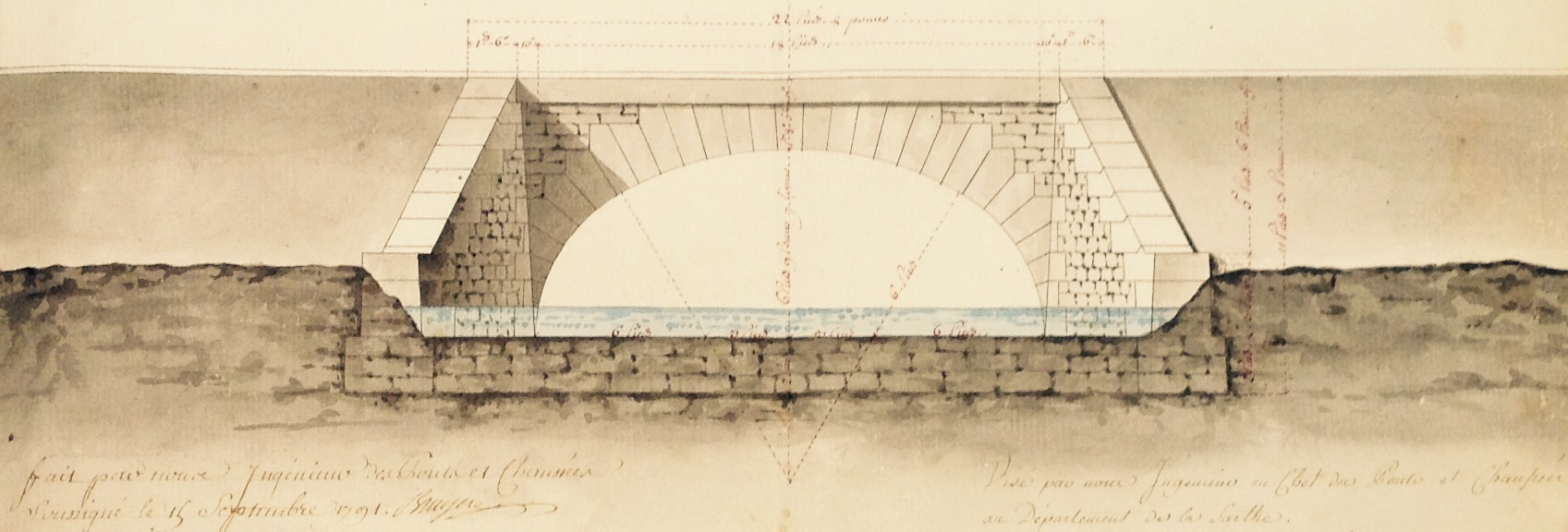
Elevation of the bridge in Blèves, designed by Louis Bruyère in 1791

Born in Lyon, he came from a middle class family there. He was trained as an architect before gaining his diploma as an engineer from Paris's École royale des ponts et chaussées, which he joined in 1783. He was made an ordinary engineer in Tours in 1786 and three years later posted to Le Mans, where he built bridges and roads in Péray, Blèves and Mamers and where he redesigned the Quinconces des Jacobins. A street in Le Mans is now named after him.

From 1799 he taught stereotomy and the art of construction at the École des Ponts et Chaussées. During the same period he was secretary to the Conseil général des ponts et chaussées. Around the same time Napoleon gave a new impetus to all public works, with major projects of all kinds begun all across France and its vast empire. Having left his role as director general of 'Ponts et Chaussées' to become Minister of the Interior, Jean-Pierre de Montalivet wished to give major public works to the civil administration and undertook them, which were thus carried out in Paris more actively.

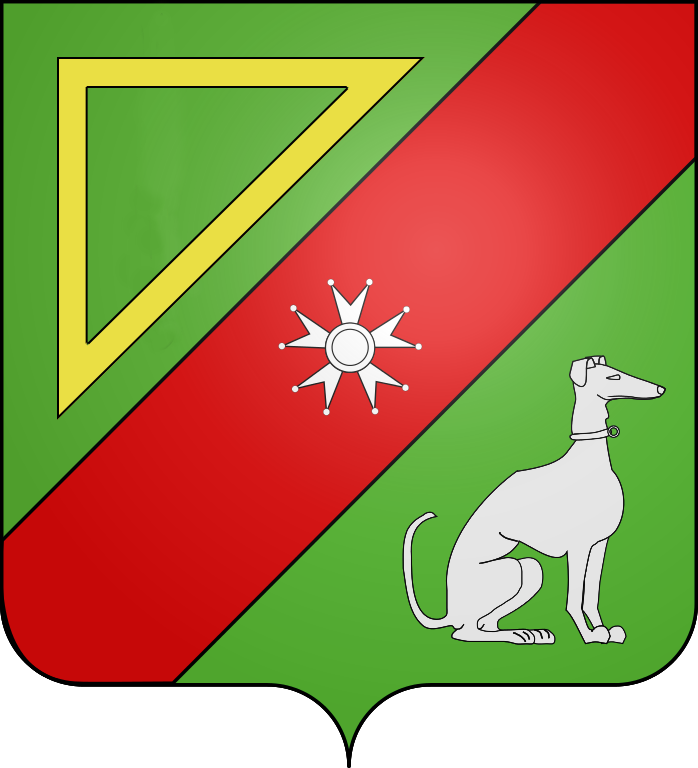
His coat of arms as a 'chevalier de l'Empire' - 'Vert, a bend sinister of one-third of the shield gules ... accompanied in chief by a golden square, and in base by a seated greyhound contourned argent; as a livery, the colours of the shield'

On Montalivet's recommendation, an imperial decree on 13 January 1811 made Bruyère maître des requêtes to the Conseil d'État and director general of public works in Paris. He was then aged fifty-three, with twenty-five years' experience as an engineer. On the following 2 May he was made a chevalier de l'Empire.

Bruyère led almost sixty million public works, of which thirty million were for Paris's city council. These included new markets, abattoirs, a general warehouse for wine, the collège d'Harcourt and the Bourse. Learning from foreign examples and a deep study of each building's nature and intended use, Bruyère made them into a group of new arrangements each perfectly adapted to their purpose.

In 1814 he was made an officer of the Legion of Honour. He suffered attacks of gout and at the end of 1819 these became more and more frequent and painful. He tried to resign as director general of public works, but for several months the city council refused to accept this. On 10 March 1820 a royal decree finally named Hely-d’Oifsel as his replacement in that role. On his resignation the city council recognised his service and granted him a lifetime pension of 5,000 francs.

In 1823 he published a work entitled études relatives à l’art des constructions, a collection of the main fruits of his research and of some other writings, particularly on how to provide enough water for Paris. Bruyère remained inspector general of 'Ponts et Chaussées' from 1820 to 1830, dying in Paris a year after resigning that post.

== Marriage and issue ==
In 1795 he married Élise Le Barbier, daughter of the painter Jean-Jacques-François Le Barbier, known as 'Barbier the elder' - she was already establishing herself as a renowned flower painter. They had five children:

  - Élisabeth Bruyère (1795-1821), married Jacques Mallet (1787-1869), engineer, deputy and senator.
    - Laure Mallet (1815-1881), married her uncle Charles Bruyère,
    - Henriette Mallet (born 1818), married François Charles Fournier (1806-1864), military intendant.
  - Étiennette Jeanne Bruyère (1800-1877), married Jean Joseph Pierre Vigoureux (1784-1857), chief engineer of bridges and roads for the Loire Lateral Canal
  - Louise Antoinette Bruyère (born 1805), married Pierre François Dausse (1793-1865), referendary counsellor to the Cour des comptes.
    - Jeanne Louise Dausse (1835-1892)
  - Jean Marie Charles Bruyère (1806-1876), student of the École polytechnique (X 1825) and the école d'artillerie de Metz from 1827, artillery officer, married his nieceLaure Mallet.
  - Eugène Léopard Bruyère (1810-1872), architect, member of the Société centrale des architectes from 1843, married Félicie Huvé (1823-1872), daughter of Jean-Jacques-Marie Huvé (1783-1852) architect, and granddaughter of the architect Jean-Jacques Huvé.
    - Louis-Charlotte Bruyère (1849-1879)
    - Cécile Bruyère (1845-1909), first abbess of Solesmes Abbey

== Bibliography (in French) ==
- Discours A Monsieur les Membres du Conseil municipal de la Ville de Paris by Henri Navier, Royal Engineer in Chief of 'Ponts et Chaussées' and member of the Institut (Académie des Sciences), Archives Nationales F/14/ BRUYERE
- Nécrologie : M. Bruyère, in Annales des ponts et chaussées. Mémoires et documents relatifs à l'art des constructions et au service de l'ingénieur, 1831, deuxieme semestre, p. 425 (online)
- Henri Navier, Notice sur M. Bruyère, in Annales des ponts et chaussées. Mémoires et documents relatifs à l'art des constructions et au service de l'ingénieur, 1833, deuxieme semestre, p. 382-403 (online)
