= Maria Brace Kimball =

American elocutionist

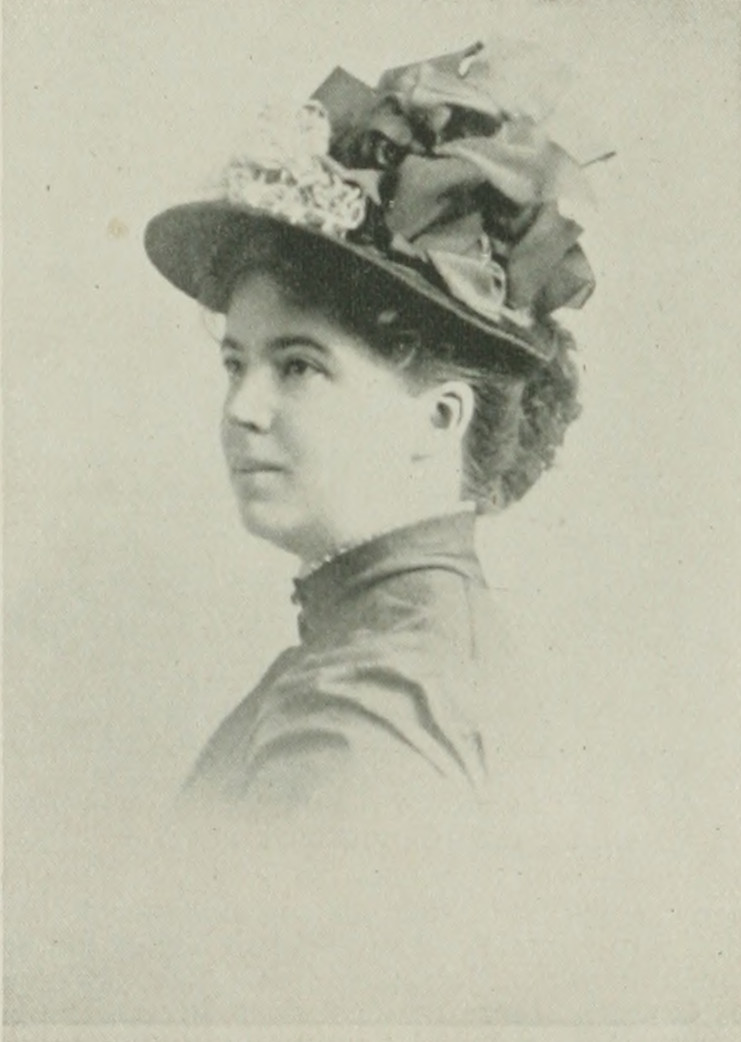
- Photo in A Woman of the Century
- Born: Maria Porter Brace; July 20, 1852; Penn Yan, New York, U.S.
- Died: 1933 (aged 80–81)
- Education: Vassar College
- Occupation: Elocutionist
- Spouse: James Peleg Kimball (m. 1892–1902)
- Children: Philip Brace Kimball
- Writing career
- Language: English
- Notable works: A Text Book of Elocution; A Soldier-doctor of our army, James P. Kimball

Maria Brace Kimball (July 20, 1852 — 1933) was an American elocutionist who taught, lectured, and wrote on the subject. She was an instructor in elocution and lecturer on dramatic literature in the American Academy of Dramatic Arts; lecturer on French theatre and dramatic literature in schools; teacher of elocution in Brearley School, New York City, 1883–92. She was the author of A Text Book of Elocution (1892) and A Soldier-doctor of our army, James P. Kimball (1917), as well as various contributions to periodicals.

== Early life and education ==
Maria Porter Brace was born in Penn Yan, New York, July 20, 1852. Her parents were Claudius B. and Harriet (Taylor) Brace. Her father was one of the first settlers in Kansas and there the family home always remained.

Her early life was spent in Leavenworth, Kansas. Kimball was educated in Vassar College and was graduated in 1872 with an A.B. (Phi Beta Kappa). A special course in elocution followed under Prof. Robert R. Raymond, in the Boston School of Oratory.

== Career ==
Her studies, preceded by practice in teaching and reading in the West, were followed by an engagement as teacher of elocution in Vassar College (1880–85). During several years of residence there, a certain time was reserved every winter for work outside of the college community. In teaching as well as in reading, Kimball always associated the art of elocution with the interpretation of the best literature. Her annotated readings from the English classics and from more recent masterpieces of prose and poetry often formed a supplement to the course in English literature in schools.

In 1883, Kimball made her first visit to Europe. Through the influence of Adolphe Regnier, the French actor and teacher, she was admitted to the daily sessions of the dramatic classes in the Conservatoire National de Musique et de Declamation, in Paris. A close study of the French classics in the hands of the pupils and of their masters, the four leading actors of the Theatre Francais, proved a valuable lesson in dramatic reading and criticism. In addition to the daily rehearsals in the Conservatoire, there were talks with Regnier, who generously gave his criticism of her own work. The course in the Conservatoire was supplemented by frequent visits to the Theatre Francais, where the professors were often seen in their well-known roles as actors. Kimball's interest in the art of acting received a great impulse from that winter in Paris.

Upon her return to New York City she read, in the Madison Square Theatre, an account of the methods of the Theatre Francais as taught in the National Conservatoire. The lecture attracted the attention of actors and critics who were present and was repeated many times in New York and elsewhere. During the spring of 1884, an effort was made to establish in New York a school for actors. Kimball became actively interested in the undertaking and was at once engaged as a teacher of dramatic elocution and lecturer upon dramatic literature. She also taught elocution in the Brearley School for Girls since its opening in New York, in 1884. Her lectures and readings became favorably known in Philadelphia and New York. The topics were "Francois Del Sarto in Paris," "Colloquial Elocution" and "Professional Elocution."

Kimball made occasional contributions to periodical literature upon various phases of her chosen subject, and she was constantly collecting material, both at home and abroad, for further essays and lectures, including a textbook of elocution. In addition to her active work in her profession, Kimball was interested in the social life of her contemporaries. She was a frequent contributor to the monthly conversations of The Meridian Club. She represented the alumnae of her own college on the governing board of the College Settlement. That home, in the slums of the East Side, represented the first organized effort of college-educated women to improve the condition of life among the poor. She was one of the founders and the first president of the Women's University Club of New York.

== Personal life ==
On February 3, 1892, in New York City, she married Dr. James Peleg Kimball (1840–1902), one of the most notable late 19th-century United States Army surgeons. He changed his middle initial later in life from Peleg to Patterson, a family name. They honeymooned at the Acropolis in Greece before making their way to his military post at Fort Clark, Texas. They had one son, Philip Brace Kimball (b. Governors Island, New York Harbor, 1898).

In 1919, Vassar Quarterly reported that Kimball had sold her property at Onteora and bought a house at Nantucket, Massachusetts, for a summer home.

Kimball opposed woman suffrage. In religion, she was Episcopalian. She was a member of the Association of College Alumnae, Associate Alumnae of Vassar College; Women's University Club, New York City; the Meridian Club, New York City; and the Onteora Club, Tannersville, New York. She died in 1933.

== Selected works ==
=== By Maria Porter Brace ===
- A Text Book of Elocution (1892)

=== By Maria Brace Kimball ===
- A Soldier-doctor of our army, James P. Kimball (1917)
