= Ponts et Chaussées =

Ponts et Chaussées (Bridges and Roads) may refer to:

- Conseil général des ponts et chaussées, organization of inspectors general of bridges and roads in France
- Corps des Ponts et Chaussées, organization of civil engineers in France
- École Nationale des Ponts et Chaussées, school of civil engineers in France
- Ingénieur des ponts et chaussées, a civil engineer in France
