= Marc-Antoine Jullien =

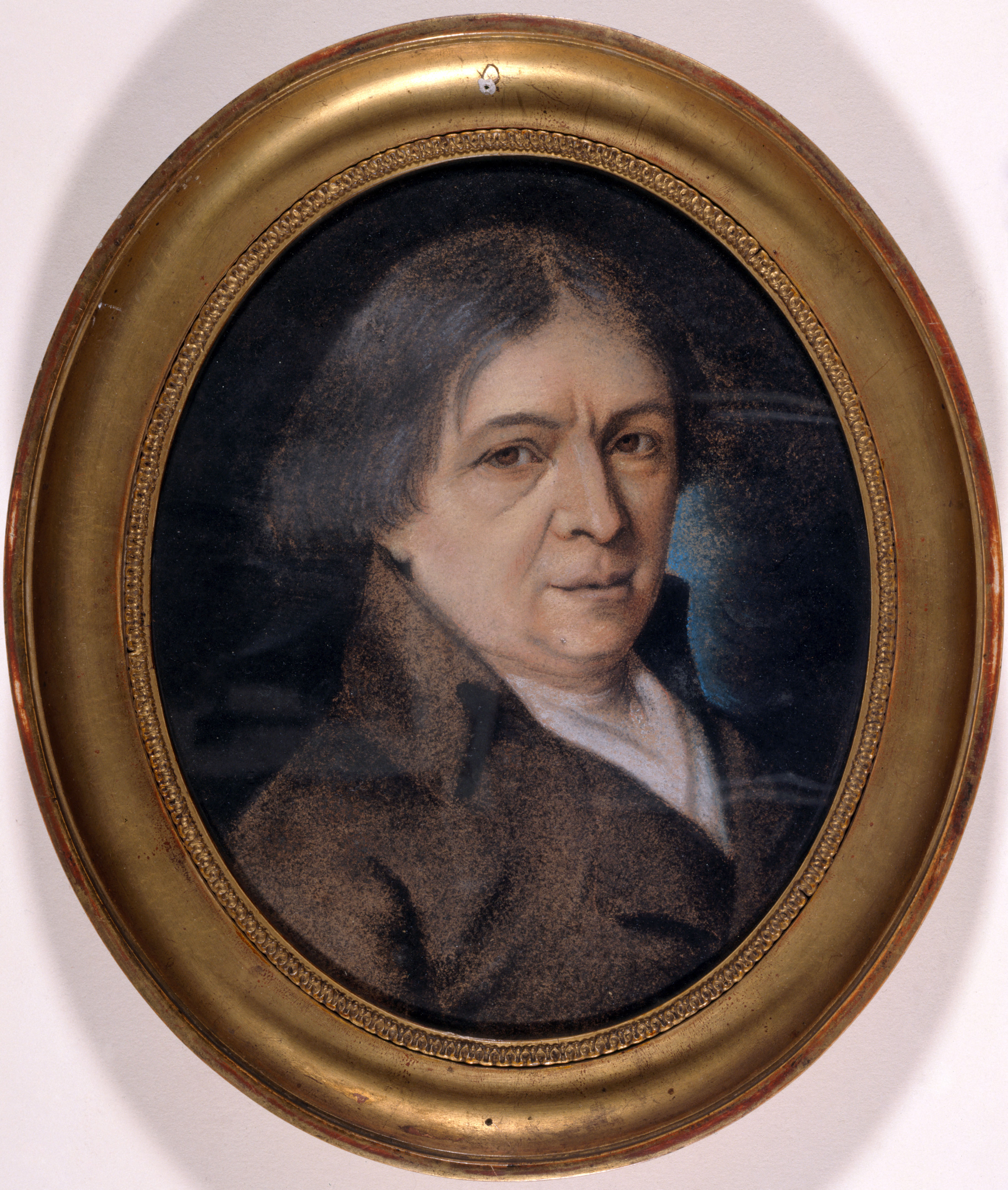

Marc-Antoine Jullien (18 April 1744 - 27 September 1821) was a French teacher and politician. He was known as Jullien de la Drôme.

His family's personal papers are now in the Archives nationales as cote 39AP. --->

== Biographie ==
=== Before the Revolution ===
He was born in Bourg-de-Péage, the eldest son of Marc Antoine Jullien, a surgeon there, and Claire Larat, who had fourteen children. Marc-Antoine junior had literary ambitions and so moved to Paris in December 1763. He wrote to Jean Jacques Rousseau that for four months he had been "studying rhetoric at the collège des Grassins under M. Le Beau the younger" The following year he won "first prize for new entrants" in French enunciation.

His success gained him protection from the abbé Mably, who presented him to Marie Louise Nicole de La Rochefoucauld, duchess of Enville (1716-1797) ; in 1766 she made him tutor to her grandson the prince of Léon, a post he held until at least 1768. Marc-Antoine Jullien was also linked to the advocate general to the parlement of Grenoble, Joseph Michel Antoine Servan (1737-1807)

Around 1774, he married Rosalie Ducrolay, daughter of a merchant from Pontoise, with whom he had two surviving sons - one, Marc-Antoine, became a close friend to Robespierre during the French Revolution and was the father of both Auguste Jullien and Adolphe Jullien.

Rosalie left a major correspondence. partly published in 1881 by her great-grandson Édouard Lockroy. In 1779, she and her husband were godparents to Marc Charles Camille Nugues, son of Claude Etienne Nugues, a merchant at Romans, and Charlotte Enfantin. Marc Charles' brother Saint-Cyr Nugues later became a general.

=== Deputy ===
He was an enthusiastic supporter of the French Revolution and actively corresponded with others of that persuasion back in the Dauphiné, which make plain his feelings about the events in Paris. This earned him a reputation as a patriot in the Drôme department, which elected him as its deputy to the Legislative Assembly in 1791 and president of the electoral assembly for that department in 1792.

France became a constitutional monarchy through the Constitution of 3 September 1791. The same month Jullien was elected alternate deputy for Drôme, its third and last in the National Legislative Assembly, but he was not summoned to sit.

=== Convention ===
In September 1792, with the royal family now in captivity, Marc-Antoine Jullien was the first to be elected as Drôme's deputy to the French National Convention. There he was nicknamed 'Jullien de la Drôme' to differentiate him from his fellow deputy Jean Julien, nicknamed 'Julien de Toulouse', deputy for Haute-Garonne. He sat on the Montagnard benches.

On 6 October 1792 he denounced the conduct of general Anne-Pierre de Montesquiou:

"I come from the Dauphiné; there I have seen soldiers of this army and I attest that they look on him as a traitor." (Murmurs)

On 26 December although the Montagnard deputies opposed adjourning judgement on Louis XVI, one episode set Jullien against the Convention's President Jacques Defermon (deputy for Ille-et-Vilaine):

"We have taken the oath to die, but to die as free men and to save the public good." (Applause from the extreme left.) I am far from all prevention : I live on the heights (Continued shows of agreement from the left.) which are ironically referred to as the Mountain, but I live on them without insolence. This passage, which Ion attacks, will become that of Thermopylae.

During the trial of Louis XVI Jullien voted for death and rejected appeal to the people and a stay of execution:

I have always hated kings, and my enlightened humanity has heard the voice of eternal justice. It is she who orders me to pronounce the death sentence on Louis Capet.

On 13 April 1793 he was absent from the vote on the impeachment of Jean-Paul Marat and on 28 May he voted against reestablishing the Extraordinary Commission of Twelve.

He was an opponent of the Girondins and when Jean-Denis Lanjuinais attacked the instigators of the insurrection of 31 May – 2 June 1793 Jullien retorted that he was slandering Paris' inhabitants. Jean-Lambert Tallien and Jean-Baptiste Carrier denounced Jullien as Robespierre's agent and protégé after the Robespierre's fall, because Jullien's eldest son had been a member of the Executive Committee of Public Education. In reality, Marc-Antoine junior had been responsible for recalling Tallien and Carrier in spring 1794, but the Convention did not pursue these accusations.

After the sittings Jullien kept his distance from public affairs, living in Paris but devoting himself to poetry and literature and publishing a few short works in the Mercure in 1802 and 1803. When the monarchy was restored in 1814 he retired to his properties in Drôme. He refused to sign the Charter of 1815 during Napoleon's Hundred Days, which the following year saved Jullien from the law of 12 January 1816 against those who had agreed to Louis XVI's execution - his exile was limited to a few months under guard in Barcelonnette. He died after falling accidentally from a balcony and was buried in the cemetery at Pizançon.

== Bibliography (in French) ==
=== Primary sources ===
- Works by Rosalie Ducrolay-Jullien
- Journal d'une bourgeoise pendant la Révolution : 1791-1793 published by her great-grandson Édouard Lockroy.
- Les affaires d'État sont mes affaire de cœur. Correspondance de Rosalie Jullien, Société des Amis de Rosalie et Marc-Antoine Jullien, 1992, 140 p., présentation en ligne.

=== Other ===
- Alphonse de Beauchamp, Biographie moderne : ou Dictionnaire biographique de tous les hommes morts et vivans qui ont marqué à la fin du 18e siècle et au commencement de celui-ci, par leurs écrits, leur rang, leurs emplois, leurs talens, leurs malheurs, leurs vertus, leurs crimes, et où tous les faits qui les concernent sont rapportés de la manière la plus impartiale et la plus authentique, Leipzig, Paul-Jacques Besson, 1807
- Adolphe Robert, Gaston Cougny (ed.), Dictionnaire des Parlementaires français de 1789 à 1889, Vol. III, Bourloton, Paris, 1889, p. 447.
- Jacques-Alphonse Mahul, Annuaire nécrologique, ou Supplément annuel et continuation de toutes les biographies ou dictionnaires historiques, 2nd année, 1821, Paris, Ponthieu, 1822, p. 226-8 .
- « JULLIEN (Marc-Antoine) », in J. Brun-Durand, Dictionnaire biographique et biblio-iconographique de la Drôme, Genève, Slatkine Reprints, 1970, vol. 2, p. 27-29.
- Albert Mathiez, « La fortune de Jullien de la Drôme », Annales historiques de la Révolution française, 1921, p. 150-151.
