= Édouard Sommer =

Édouard Sommer (6 April 1822, Nancy, France - July 1866, Paris) was a French philologist, novelist, translator, grammarian and lexicographer.

== Life ==
Sommer took his agrégation in letters in 1846 and graduated from Dijon University in 1847 with theses on "the Character of the Genius of Pindar" (Paris, 1847) and "Quomodo tradi possit synonymorum graecorum doctrina" (Paris, 1847). He translated several authors from ancient Greek and Latin and published successful manuals, textbooks, grammars and dictionaries on those two languages as well as French - these were published by Louis Hachette. Urged to do so by Hachette, he and Bernard Jullien assisted Émile Littré in the creation of his French dictionary.

== Selected works ==
- (Editor and translator) Oeuvres de Pindare, Paris 1848
- Manuel de style, 2 vol., Paris 1848
- Manuel de style épistolaire, 2 vol., Paris 1849
- Petit dictionnaire des synonymes français, Paris 1849, most recently republished in 1906
- Petit dictionnaire des rimes françaises, Paris 1850, most recently republished in 1879
- Lexique latin-français à l'usage des classes élémentaires, Paris 1851, most recently republished in 1949
- Lexique français-latin à l'usage des classes élémentaires, Paris 1860, most recently republished in 1959
- Cours complet de grammaire française, Paris 1861
- Abrégé de grammaire grecque, Paris 1861
- Cours complet de grammaire latine, Paris 1861
- Cours complet de grammaire grecque, Paris 1862
- Lexique grec-français, Paris 1862, most recently republished in 1934
- Premières notions de grammaire générale, Paris 1864
- Lexique de la langue de Madame de Sevigne, 2 vol., Paris 1866, New York/Hildesheim 1973 (posthumously published by his teacher Adolphe Regnier, republished in 1973)

== Bibliography (in French) ==
- Pierre Larousse, Grand dictionnaire universel du XIXe siècle s.v.
- André Desfeuilles, "Un émule de Lhomond. Edouard Sommer, humaniste et grammairien, 1822-1866", in: Le Vieux papier. Bulletin de la Société archéologique, historique et artistique pour l'étude de la vie et des moeurs d'autrefois, Paris 1959, S. 127–131
- Jean-Claude Polet (ed.) Patrimoine littéraire européen. Index général, Brüssel 2000 s. v.
