= Jacques Mallet (1787-1869) =

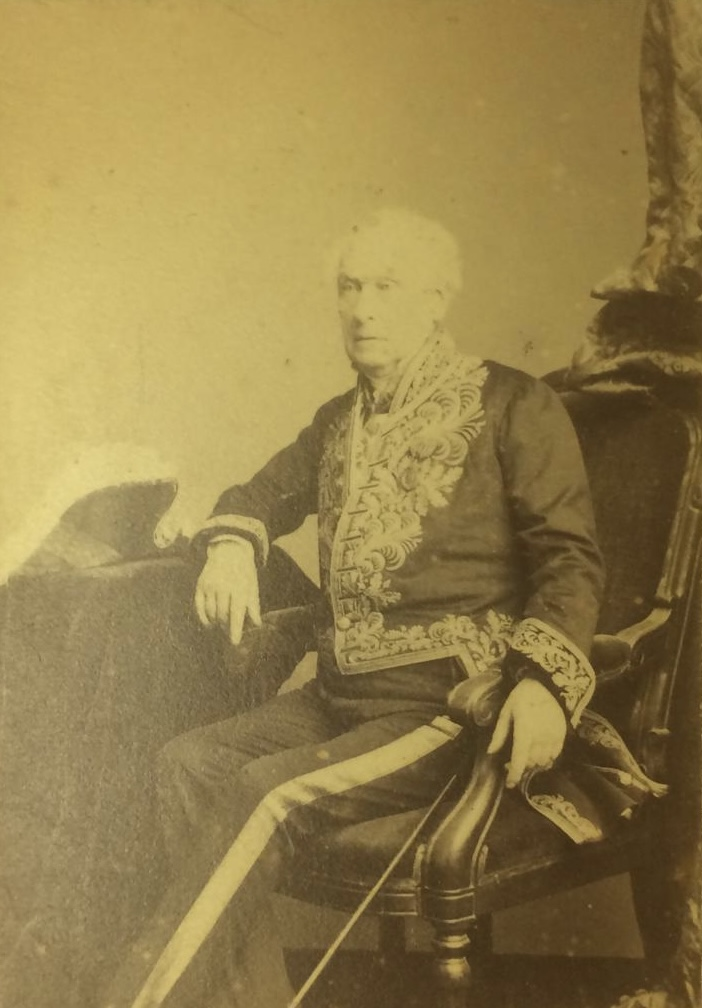

Jacques Mallet (28 April 1787 – 22 May 1869) was a French engineer and politician. He held the Saint Helena Medal.

== Life ==
He was born in Dieppe to Jean-Baptiste Mallet and Marie-Marthe Langlois. He was in the École polytechnique from 1806 to 1808 before joining the ponts et chaussées. Becoming an ordinary engineer, he completed the Pont d'Iéna under Corneille Lamandé.

In 1812 he married Élisabeth Bruyère, daughter of Louis Bruyère and granddaughter of Jean-Jacques Le Barbier - the couple had two children, both daughters. When the Allied forces crossed the French border in 1814 he was a captain in the engineers in the National Guard, taking part in the defence of Paris. He also tried to pacify Belleville during the Hundred Days. Some time later he was made a knight of the Legion of Honour.

In 1824 he led construction of the pont de Grenelle and the port by it, becoming a chief engineer in 1829. He was then sent to the Loiret department and next to the Seine-Inférieure where he completed Rouen's stone bridge. He was recalled to Paris shortly afterwards and there worked on water distribution to homes.

Whilst in Paris he became involved in the political movement of 1830, serving as deputy for the eleventh college of Seine-Inférieure (Saint-Valery-en-Caux) on 5 July 1831, with 91% of the vote, and on 2 March 1839 with 53% of the vote. He was and remained part of the ministerial majority and voted in favour of the grant from the duc de Nemours, its fortifications and the census and against adding capacities.

In 1842 he was made a divisional inspector and no longer sought electors' votes, devoting himself exclusively to his engineering work. On 1 May 1843 he was made a Commander of the Legion of Honour. In 1850 he was made an inspector-general of ponts et chaussées. He was vice-president of the conseil général des ponts et chaussées from 1854 to the start of 1857 and then retired. On 9 June 1857 he was made a senator - in that chamber he served on the Isthmus of Suez commission. He was made a Grand Officer of the Legion of Honour on 14 August 1862. On 2 June 1866 Napoleon III made him comte Mallet. He died in the 9th arrondissement of Paris.

== Bibliography (in French) ==
- Notice historique sur le projet de distribution générale d'eau à domicile à Paris (1830).
- "Jacques Mallet (1787-1869)", in Adolphe Robert and Gaston Cougny, Dictionnaire des parlementaires français (1789–1891), Bourloton, Paris, 1889 Edition details Wikisource
