= Bernard Jullien =

French teacher, novelist and linguist (1798–1881)

Bernard Jullien (2 February 1798 – 15 October 1881) was a French teacher, novelist and linguist.

== Life ==
Jullien was born in Paris, and went to school in Versailles. After graduating, he began his teaching career at the Collège Sainte-Barbe, going on to teach in Dieppe (1831-1835) and later Paris. In 1836 he graduated from the Sorbonne under Joseph Victor Leclerc with a thesis on Aristotle's Physics (published in 1854 as his book De quelques points des sciences dans l'antiquité) and Sur l'étude et l'enseignement de la grammaire (Paris 1836). He later also earned a degree in natural sciences.

Jullien was most notable as an author of grammatical and literary textbooks for schools for the publisher Louis Hachette. As associates of that publishing house he and Édouard Sommer also helped Émile Littré create his dictionary. From 1840 Jullien edited the journal L'Enseignement. Bulletin d'éducation and from 1843 to 1850 he was the editor of Revue de l'instruction publique. From 1854 he was also the chief editor of the monthly Le Correspondant.

Nostalgic for the First French Empire and an anti-Romantic thinker, he preferred 18th century Age of Enlightenment rationalism and so could not gain a foothold on the university career ladder before the rise of the French Second Empire - as seen in the preface to his 1844 Histoire, he felt himself unfairly treated. His thinking and wide reading fully developed under Napoleon III in six extensive theses on grammar, literature, history, and philosophy and was more devoted to clarity than originality.

His son, Adolphe Jullien, was a French musicologist and journalist.

== Works ==
=== Main works ===
- Histoire de la poésie française à l'époque impériale ou Exposé par ordre de genres de ce que les poètes français ont produit de plus remarquable depuis la fin du XVIIIe siècle jusqu'aux premières années de la Restauration, 2 vol.s, Paris 1844 (derived from lectures at the Athénée Royal 1841–1842)
- (ed.) Fénelon, Dialogues des morts, Paris 1847, last republished in 1893
- Polémique sur quelques points de métrique ancienne, Paris 1854
- De quelques points des sciences dans l'antiquité. Physique, métrique, musique, Paris 1854
- (Hrsg.) Les paradoxes littéraires de Lamotte, ou Discours écrits par cet académicien sur les principaux genres de poèmes, Paris 1859, Genf 1971 (Antoine Houdar de la Motte)
- L'Harmonie du langage chez les Grecs et les Romains, ou Étude sur la prononciation de la prose élevée et des vers dans les langues classiques, Paris 1867

==== Theses ====
- Thèses de grammaire, Paris 1855 (darin: Coup d’œil sur l’histoire de la grammaire, 1-50)
- Thèses de littérature, Paris 1856
- Thèses de critique et poésies, Paris 1858
- Thèses supplémentaires de métrique et de musique anciennes, de grammaire et de littérature, Paris 1861
- Thèses d'histoire et nouvelles historiques, Paris 1865
- Thèses de philosophie, Paris 1873

=== Textbooks ===
- Grammaire générale. Abrégé de la grammaire française, Dieppe 1832
- Histoire de la Grèce ancienne, Paris 1837, Tours 1838
- Abrégé de grammaire latine, Paris 1841
- Petit traité d'analyse grammaticale, Paris 1843
- Petit traité d'analyse logique, Paris 1843
- Manuel des examens dans les écoles primaires, Paris 1850
- Questions et exercices sur la Grammaire française de Lhomond, Paris 1851
- Traité complet de grammaire française, Paris 1852
- Vocabulaire grammatical de la langue française, Paris 1852
- Le language vicieux corrigé, ou Liste alphabétique des fautes les plus ordinaires dans la pronunciation, l'écriture et la construction des phrases, Paris 1853
- Manuel de la conjugaison des verbes français, Paris 1853
- Petit traité de rhétorique et de littérature, Paris 1853
- Petit traité des participes français, Paris 1853
- Explication des principales difficultés de l'enseignement de la grammaire, Paris 1854
- Les principales étymologies de la langue française précédées d'un petit traité de la dérivation et de la composition des mots, Paris 1862
- Les Éléments matériels du français, c'est-à-dire les sons de la langue française entendus ou représentés, Paris 1875
- Les Formes harmoniques du français, savoir les périodes, les vers, les stances et les refrains, Paris 1876

== Bibliography ==
- (in French) Charles Defodon, « Jullien (Marcel Bernard) », in: Ferdinand Buisson (ed.), Nouveau Dictionnaire de pédagogie et d’instruction primaire, Paris 1911 (http://www.inrp.fr/edition-electronique/lodel/dictionnaire-ferdinand-buisson/document.php?id=2971)
