= Pierre-Alexandre Adolphe Jullien =

Pierre-Adolphe or Adolphe Jullien (13 February 1803 – 1 March 1873) was a French engineer in the Corps des ponts et chaussées. He was director of the Compagnie des chemins de fer de l'Ouest and promoted railways in France.

Rue Adolphe-Jullien in the 1st arrondissement of Paris is named after him.

== Life ==
He was born in Amiens to politician Jullien de Paris. He and his brothers Auguste and Alfred studied under Johann Heinrich Pestalozzi in Yverdon. In 1830 Pierre-Adolphe designed the major canal-bridges on the Loire Lateral Canal at Digoin over the Loire and at Guétin over the Allier, under the supervision of the engineers-in-chief Jean Joseph Pierre Vigoureux and Marie-Noël Lejeune.

In 1837 he was posted to the Loire Lateral Canal service, where he was tasked with maintaining the Aisne navigation on 31 July. In this post he was effectively chief engineer.

In May 1843 he was made chief engineer first class in Orléans upon the opening of the railway company building a line from there to Paris. In 1846 he moved to become chief engineer of the company building a Paris to Lyon line, created on 1 March 1846. He was put in charge of building the line, managing ordinary engineer second class Jules Poirée and others.

He kept his posts when the line came back into state ownership by nationalisation after the company failed. On 10 September 1849 president Louis-Napoléon Bonaparte awarded him the cross of the Legion of Honour, upon Jullien's arrival on the Parisian scene for the inauguration of the first section of the Paris-Lyon line as far as Sens, of which he was chief engineer.

When the new company began work on the line again, he was kept on as director of exploitation and construction. He died at 133 Avenue de Malakoff in Paris on 1 March 1873 and his funeral occurred on 5 March at Notre-Dame-de-Lorette..

== Publications ==
- Note sur les pouzzolanes artificielles employées dans la construction des ponts aqueducs de Guétin sur l'Allier, et de Digoin sur la Loire, dans Annales des ponts et chaussées. Mémoires et documents relatifs à l'art des constructions et au service de l'ingénieur, 2e semestre 1834, p. 30-44 (online version).
- Observations sur la jurisprudence du conseil d'état, relativement aux indemnités pour dommages occasionnés à des usines, par des travaux d'utilité publique, dans Annales des ponts et chaussées. Mémoires et documents relatifs à l'art des constructions et au service de l'ingénieur, 1er semestre 1837, p. 20-36 (online version).
- Notes sur quelques propriétés du polygone qu'affecte la chaîne d'un pont suspendu, dans Annales des ponts et chaussées. Mémoires et documents relatifs à l'art des constructions et au service de l'ingénieur, 1er semestre 1837, p. 133-167 (online version) et planche CXXVI (online version).
- Note sur la jurisprudence du conseil d'état en matière d'indemnités, dans Annales des ponts et chaussées. Mémoires et documents relatifs à l'art des constructions et au service de l'ingénieur, 1er semestre 1838, p. 94-119 (online version).
- Du prix des transports sur les chemins de fer, dans Annales des ponts et chaussées. Mémoires et documents relatifs à l'art des constructions et au service de l'ingénieur, 2e semestre 1844, p. 1-68 (online version).
- Notes diverses sur les chemins de fer, en Angleterre, en Belgique et en France, dans Annales des ponts et chaussées. Mémoires et documents relatifs à l'art des constructions et au service de l'ingénieur, 1er semestre 1845, p. 145-224 (online version).
