= Quinconces des Jacobins =

Set of parks in Le Mans, France

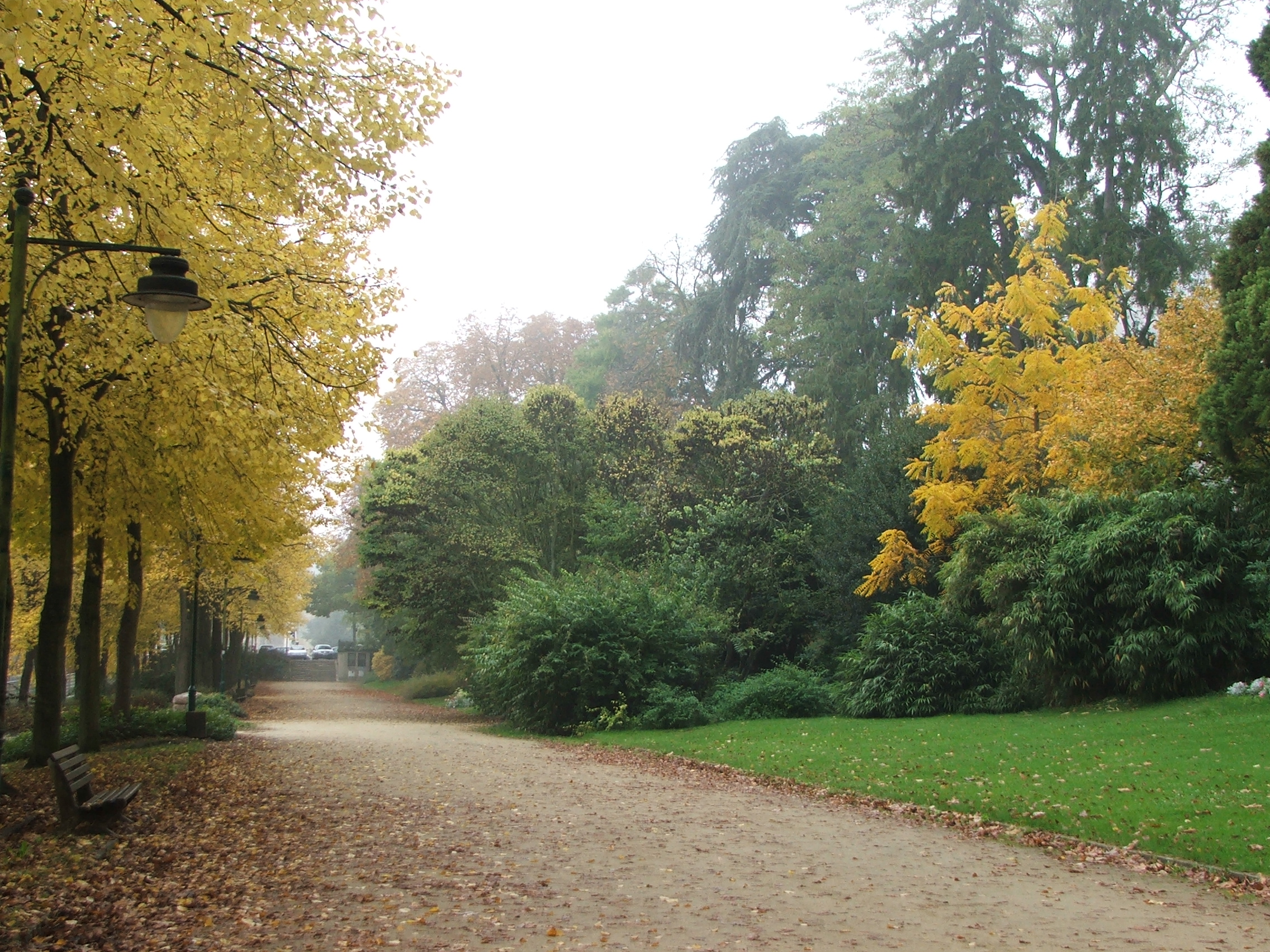
A path in the Quinconces in autumn

The quinconces des Jacobins is a set of parks in the 'Centre' sector of Le Mans. Its nearest station is the Jacobins - Quinconces tramway stop.

== History ==
It was completely redesigned in 1792 by civil engineer Louis Bruyère. Previously it had been a square occupied by Dominican (in French 'Jacobin') and Franciscan monasteries.

It has a central esplanade, sometimes used for parking and sometimes for cultural or celebratory events like forums, fairs, circuses and exhibitions. Along that esplanade are several different parks, made up of artificial rivers, giving a forest atmosphere at the heart of the city centre. Their water is drawn from the Sarthe a few kilometres away. The northern space is very wooded and dark, with commemorative statues from the bloody post-revolutionary era.

On the south side are sandy pathways with floral parterres along them, with trees giving shade. It is less green than the north side but more floral. The quinconces are continued to the east by the parc de Tessé, part of the Musée de Tessé.

== Cultural events ==
The Quinconces are just behind the Jacobins cultural centre, which is made up of a cinema and a theatre. The esplanade is usually paid parking, but this is suspended for many cultural events also happen there throughout the year, such as the 'Forum Jeune' at the start of each school year, exhibitions for the Festival Puls'Art, an annual meet-up by art lovers, the 25e Heure du livre (the city's annual autumn reading festival), and the winter and summer funfairs.

== Bibliography (in French) ==
- Le sous-sol des Jacobins révèle ses secrets : 2000 ans d'histoire, la virée de galerne in "La Vie Mancelle et Sarthoise" Numéro 405, page 51
- Fouilles archéologiques dans le parking derrière le théâtre avant travaux pour le futur espace culturel des Jacobins in "La vie Mancelle et Sarthoise" Numéro 403, page 47
- Place des Jacobins en 1624, en fin du XIXe, en 1904, en 19121, vers 1930 ; en 1736, vers 1820, vers 1840, Exposition de 1911, de 1923 in "La Vie Mancelle et Sarthoise" Numéro 335 pages 13 à 20
- La Place des Jacobins au Mans avant la Révolution in "Revue Historique et Archéologique du Maine" ; 1923, pages 49 à 68
- Didier Travier, Les Jacobins : urbanisme et sociabilité au Mans, éditions de la Reinette, 2007, 143 pages
