= Élise Bruyère =

French artist (1776–1847)

- Born: 1776
- Died: 1847 (aged 70–71)
- Known for: Painting

Élise Bruyère (1776–1847) was a French painter who specialized in portraits and floral still lifes.

Bruyère was the daughter of Jean-Jacques-François Le Barbier (1738–1826), a noted French writer, illustrator, and painter of French historical scenes. Her sister Henriette was also a painter. Bruyère was of the Realist school of French painting, she had studied with Jean-Baptiste Jacques Augustin and Jan Frans van Dael and her still lifes, particularly her paintings of flowers, are remarkably detailed. A typical work, Vase de fleurs, is in the Musée du Louvre in Paris.

In 1795 she married the civil engineer Louis Bruyère.

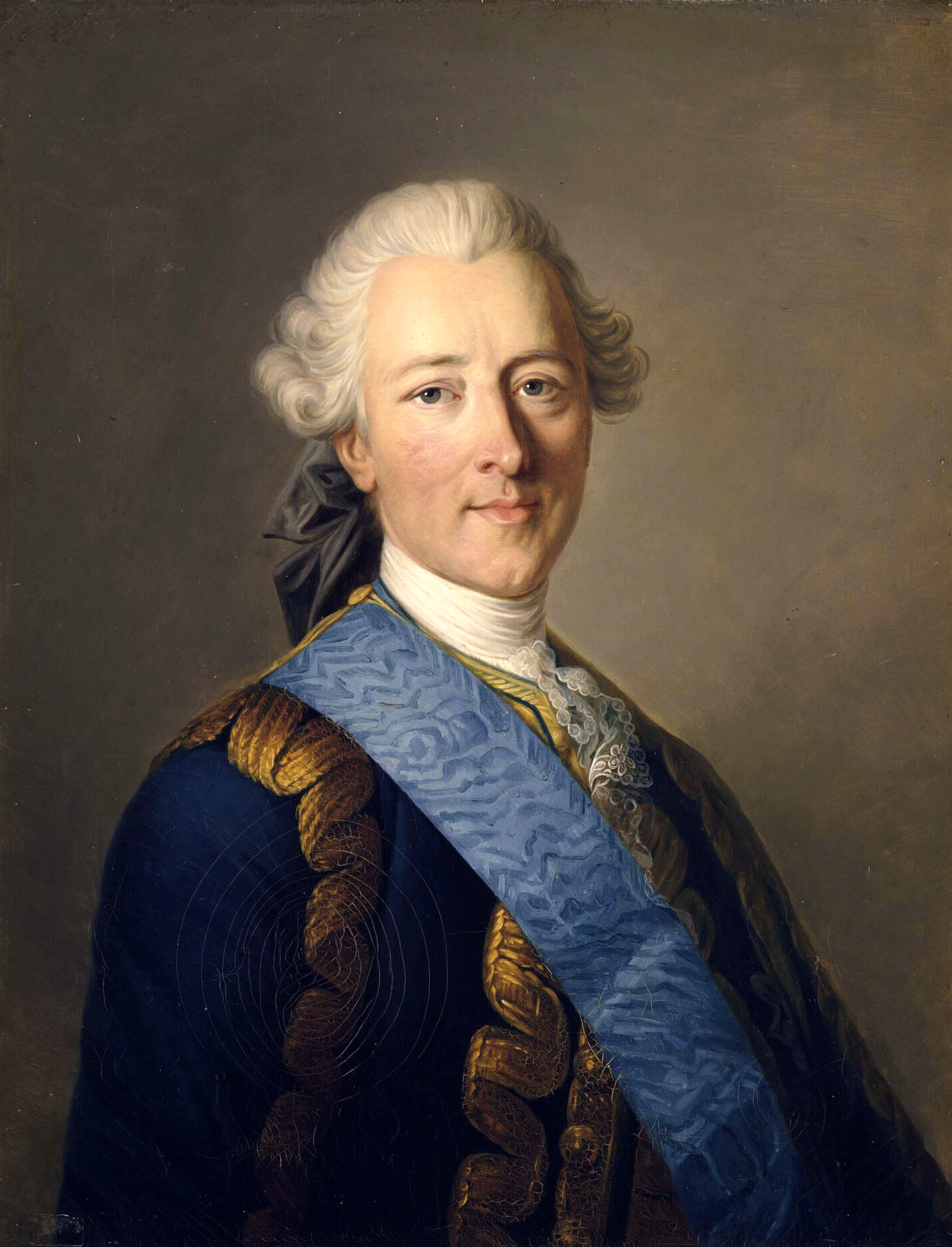
Portrait of Charles Juste Beauvau by Élise Bruyère

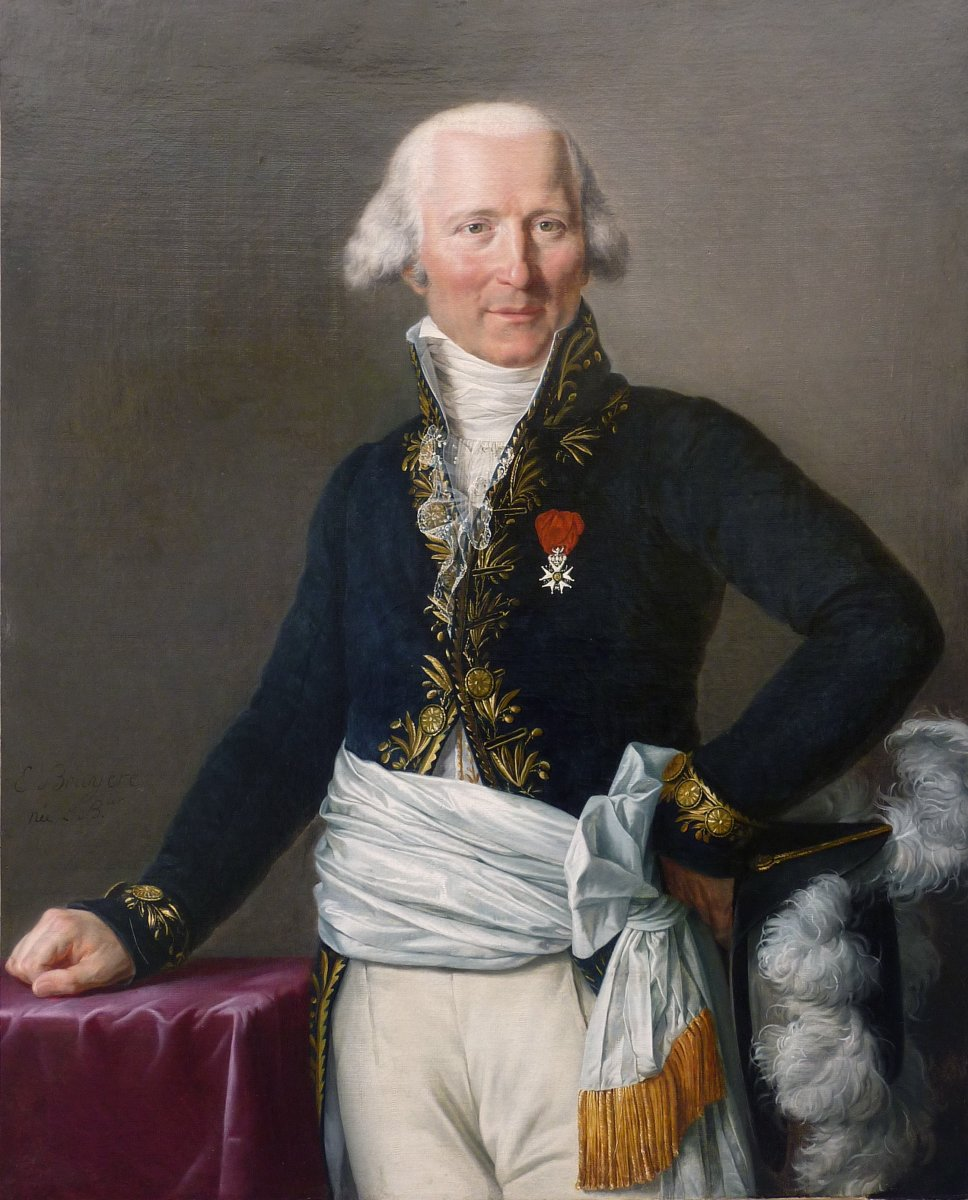
Portrait of Joseph Leopold Saget, circa 1806

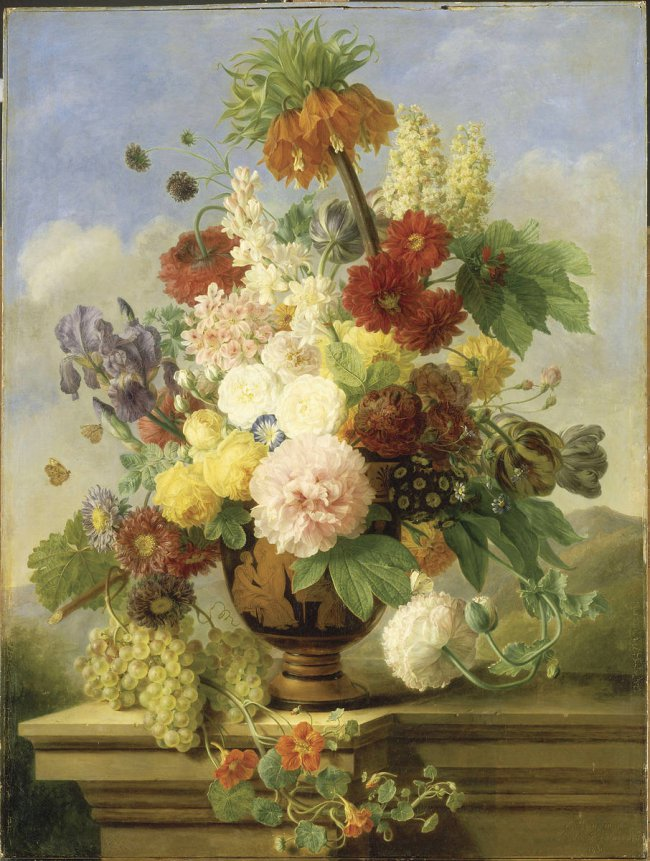
Flowers, Louvre

== Bibliography ==
- Ferdinand Hoefer, Nouvelle Biographie Générale, vol. 30, Paris: Firmin-Didot, 1859, p. 63-4.
- Théodore-Éloi Lebreton, Biographie Rouennaise, Rouen: Le Brument, 1865, p. 207-8.
- Noémi Noire Oursel, Nouvelle Biographie Normande, Paris: Picard, 1886, p. 63.
