= Louis Joseph Victor Jullien de Bidon =

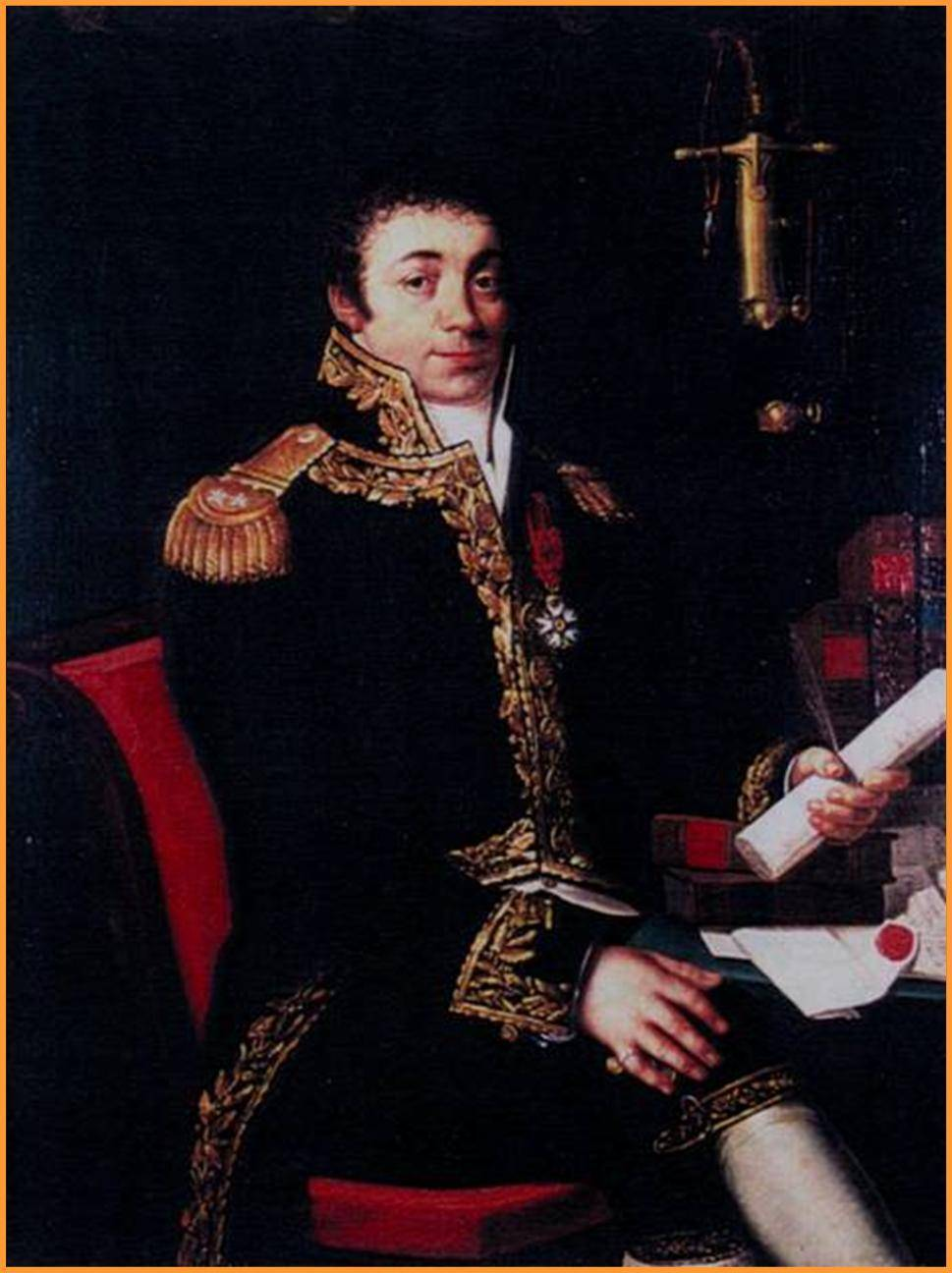
- Born: 12 March 1764; Lapalud, Comtat Venaissin
- Died: 19 May 1839 (aged 75); Lapalud, Comtat Venaissin
- Relatives: Thomas Prosper Jullien and Frédéric Benoît Victoire Jullien (brothers)
- Military career
- Allegiance: First French Republic; First French Empire
- Branch: Artillery
- Service years: 1781–1815
- Rank: Général de brigade
- Commands: Rosetta, Egypt under general Menou; (3 August 1798)
- Conflicts: French Revolutionary Wars; Egyptian Campaign
- Awards: Légion d'honneur (Commander)
- Other work: Préfet of Morbihan

Louis Joseph Victor Jullien de Bidon (French pronunciation: [lwi ʒozɛf viktɔʁ ʒyljɛ̃ də bidɔ̃]; Lapalud, 12 March 1764 – Lapalud, 19 May 1839) was a French officer and nobleman.

== Life ==
He was the elder brother of Bonaparte's aide de camp in Egypt Thomas Prosper Jullien. He became a supernumerary student of artillery on 16 August 1781, a student on 18 January the following year, and a lieutenant on 1 September 1783. He served in the 1st Artillery Regiment (La Fère). He became a captain and second in command of the 5th Artillery Regiment on 1 April 1791 and then adjutant general on 1 Mary 1792, adjutant general and chef de bataillon on 10 pluviôse year II, and adjudant-général chef de brigade on 25 prairial year III.

== Coat of arms ==
Écartelé : au 1, de gueules, au lion d'or; au 2, d'or, à un ours rampant de sable, posé en bande; au 3, d'or, à un palmier de sinople; au 4, d'hermine plein; au canton des Comtes Conseillers d'État brochant sur la partition. Quatre lambrequins, deux d'or et deux d'argent, toque de velours noir, retroussée de contre-hermine, avec porte aigrette or et argent, surmonté de cinq plumes d'argent.

== Bibliography ==
- Mullié, Charles (1852). "JULLIEN (Louis-Joseph-Victor, comte)" . Biographie des célébrités militaires des armées de terre et de mer de 1789 à 1850 (in French). Paris: Poignavant et Compagnie.
