= Adolphe Jullien =

French journalist, author, and musicologist

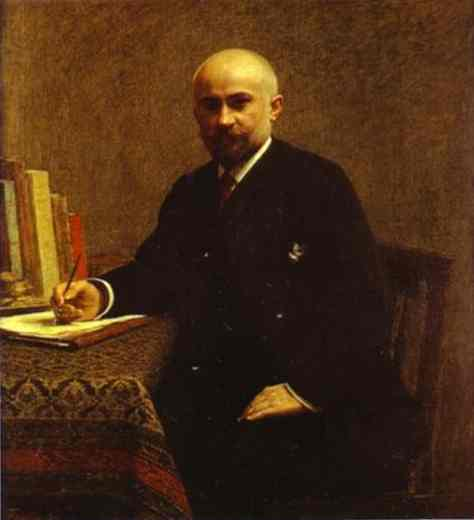
Portrait of Adolphe Jullien by Henri Fantin-Latour (1887)

Jean Lucien Adolphe Jullien (1 June 1845 – 30 August 1932) known as Adolphe Jullien was a French journalist, author, and musicologist. He was born into a family of letters. His grandfather Bernard Jullien (1752–1826), was a prominent professor, while his father Marcel Bernard Jullien (1798–1881), was a distinguished teacher and linguist and a major contributor to the Dictionary of Émile Littré. Jullien published numerous books and articles on a wide variety of topics, primarily music, and was actively involved in the controversy over the role and influence of Wagner's music in late nineteenth century France.

== Life ==
Adolphe Jullien was educated at the Lycée Charlemagne in Paris, where he received a degree in law. He studied music with the composer Émile Bienaimé, at the time a retired professor at the Conservatoire de Paris.

As a music critic, his work appeared in various journals, including the Revue et gazette musicale de Paris, Le Ménestrel, Le Correspondant, Le Figaro, and other periodicals. He also wrote numerous books on music and composers.

== Bibliography ==
- L'Opera en 1788 (1873)
- La Musique et les Philosophes au XVIIIe siècle (1873)
- L'Église et l'Opéra en 1735 (1877)
- Weber à Paris (1877)
- Airs variés, histoire, critique, biographies musicales et dramatiques' (1877)
- La Cour et l'Opéra sous Louis XVI (1878)
- La Comédie et la Galanterie au XVIIIe siècle (1879)
- Histoire du Costume au Théâtre (1880)
- Goethe et la musique (1880)
- L'Opéra secret au XVIIIe siècle (1880)
- La Ville et la Cour au XVIIIe siècle
- Hector Berlioz' (1882)
- La Comédie à la Cour (1883)
- Paris dilettante au commencement du siècle (1884)
- Richard Wagner, sa vie et ses œuvres (1886)
