= Frédéric Benoît Victoire Jullien =

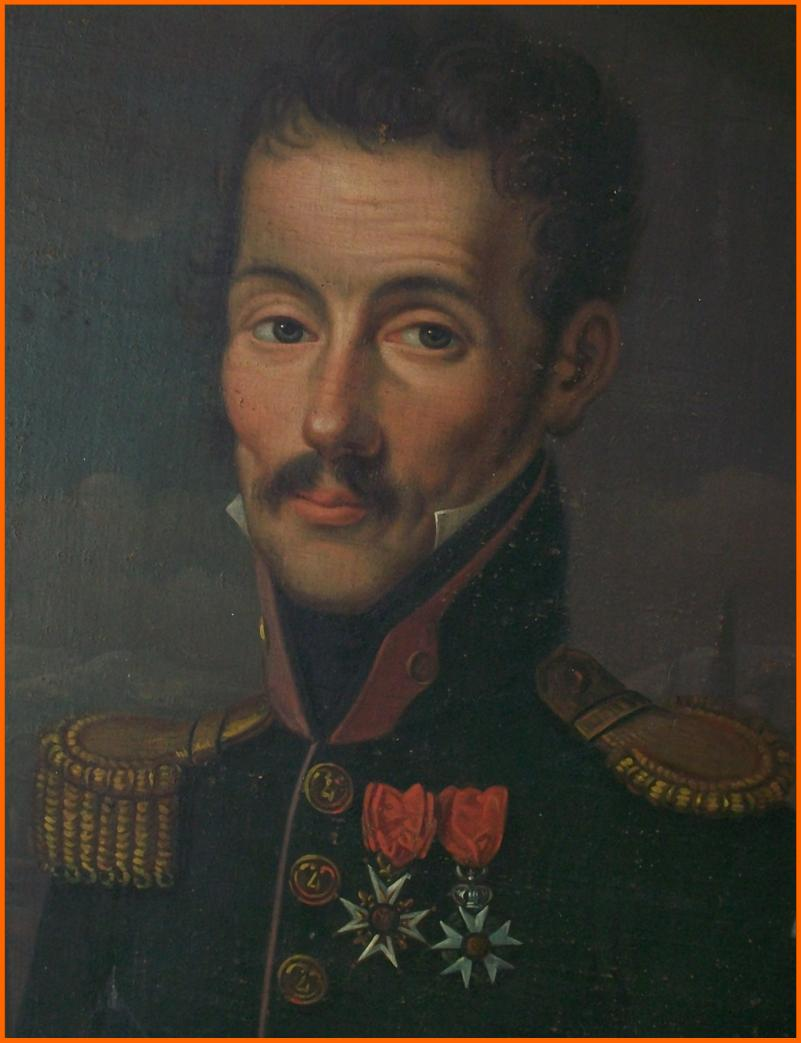
- Frédéric Benoît Victoire Jullien
- Born: April 13, 1785; Lapalud, Comtat Venaissin, Papal States (now Provence-Alpes-Côte d'Azur, France)
- Died: August 28, 1825 (aged 40); Lapalud, Comtat Venaissin, Kingdom of France
- Relatives: Louis Joseph Victor Jullien de Bidon and Thomas Prosper Jullien (brothers)
- Military career
- Allegiance: First French Empire; Kingdom of France
- Branch: Cavalry
- Service years: 1807–1825
- Rank: Lieutenant Colonel
- Conflicts: Napoleonic Wars; (Italy, Germany, Austria, France)
- Awards: Chevalier of the Legion of Honour (1822); Chevalier of the Ordre Royal et Militaire de Saint-Louis (1816)

Frédéric Benoît Victoire Jullien (13 April 1785 – 28 August 1825) was a French officer. Unlike his elder brothers, General Louis Joseph Victor Jullien de Bidon and Captain Thomas Prosper Jullien, he made his name under the Bourbon Restoration.

== Early life ==
Jullien was born on 13 April 1785 in the Comtat Venaissin enclave of the Papal States.

== Military career ==
In August 1807 he was made a lieutenant in Italy and on 8 May 1809 he fought in the Battle of Piave River. While crossing the river during the battle he received a sabre cut across his right cheek, stretching from his ear to his upper lip. In April 1809 the second Austrian campaign began and despite his wound, Jullien rejoined his unit in Germany that July. He was made a captain in the 28th Dragoon Regiment of the Grande Armée in August, at Graz in Styria. He fought in the campaigns in France from January to April 1814 during which Napoleon I of France failed to prevent the Allied invasion of France and hold onto the throne.

He ceased to serve in the imperial forces on 6 April 1814 after Napoleon's abdication. Under the Restoration which followed, he was made a captain of the Dragons de la Manche, before being made a Knight of the Order of Saint Louis on 18 December 1816. He was made a Knight of the Legion of Honour on 18 December 1822 as lieutenant colonel of the 4e Régiment de la Gironde.

== Death ==
He died of several wounds at Lapalud on 28 August 1825. He had one son, Eugène-Frédéric Louis Marie-Victor de Jullien (16 December 1824 – 1836). His now-vanished tomb bore the inscription (translated into English):

Honour and Fatherland, Here lies Frédéric de Jullien, Major of the Régiment des dragons de la Gironde, Knight of the Orders of the Légion d'honneur and of Saint-Louis, Taken aged 40 from the family whose ornament, glory and happiness he was, from the army in which he was one of the most valiant soldiers, from the fatherland for which he gave his blood more than ten times. His wife, Elizabeth Jeanne Avias. His brother, the maréchal de camp, comte Jullien, and his wife, inconsolable, have raised this monument. He died on 28 August 1825.
