= Thomas Prosper Jullien =

French General

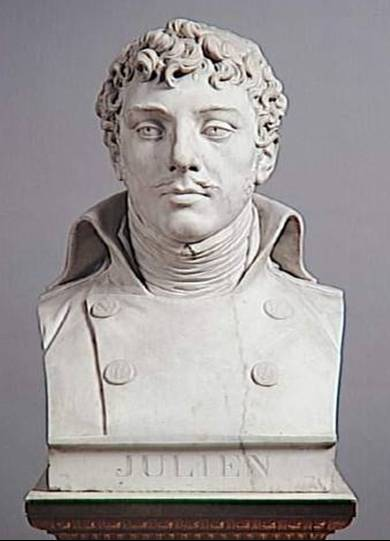
- Born: 21 December 1773; Lapalud, Comtat Venaissin
- Died: 2 August 1798 (aged 24); Alkam or Alquam, Egypt
- Relatives: Louis Joseph Victor and Frédéric Benoît Victoire (brothers)
- Military career
- Allegiance: Kingdom of France; French First Republic
- Branch: Army
- Service years: 1789-1798
- Conflicts: French Revolutionary Wars; Italian campaigns; Egyptian campaign †

Thomas Prosper Jullien (21 December 1773, Lapalud, France - 1798, Egypt) was a French army officer of the French Revolutionary Wars. Aide de camp to Bonaparte, he rose to the rank of captain and was brother of the famous general Louis Joseph Victor Jullien de Bidon.

== Life ==
=== Early military career (1792-95) ===
In 1789, aged 17, he entered the National Guard of Lapalud, which had just been created. Aged 19 he became a sous lieutenant in the régiment d’Aquitaine, which later became the 35th Infantry Regiment. Six months later, in 1792, he rose to lieutenant and replaced Louis Vincent Le Blond de Saint-Hilaire

At the siege of Toulon (September - December 1793), Thomas Prosper met Bonaparte, then a lieutenant in the 34th Infantry Regiment, and took command of the chasseurs in second battalion. He then became a captain attached to the adjutant general St Hilaire (1794) and rose to captain on 3 April 1795.

=== Italy (1796-97) ===
With St Hilaire, he moved to the armée d’Italie, where he met the chief of staff in Milan. On 7 September 1796, Prosper fought in the battle at Covelo and the crossing of the Brenta gorges, where he was mentioned by Bonaparte in the same despatches as he mentioned Duroc and Augereau. On 5 October 1796, he rose to captain and Bonaparte attached him to his chief of staff, in which role the young Prosper often had the chance to meet Bonaparte at home on the rue Chantereine. He escorted Josephine from Milan to Paris with Junot and Louis Bonaparte. He became Bonaparte's aide de camp on 9 April 1798 but the end of the Italian campaign ended before he could take up the post. In 1797, Bonaparte chose him to accompany Marmont on his embassy to Rome to meet pope Pius VI, thinking that Prosper would make a good impression on the Romans as to the manners of the French army. General Louis Desaix also described Prosper in his Journal de voyages as "a jolly boy, good manners, swarthy". René Bouscayrol wrote of him as "a handsome, swarthy infantry captain"

=== Egypt (1798) ===
On 3 May 1798, Bonaparte left Paris to embark at Toulon, accompanied by Josephine and Jullien. He became Bonaparte's aide de camp and together they set out for Egypt on 19 May that year on board the Orient. On 30 July 1798, Jullien left for Alexandria, escorted by a dozen men of 75th demi-brigade, with letters addressed to admiral François-Paul Brueys d'Aigalliers "ordering him to moor immediately in the Old Port [of Alexandria] or take refuge in Corfu" and to generals Kléber and Jacques-François Menou. He and his escort were massacred by the inhabitants of the village of Alkam (also spelled Alquam) shortly afterwards, on 2 August.

In Alexandria, Kléber wrote to Bonaparte on 22 August 1798, saying "I learned with true sorrow of the death of poor Julien [sic], your aide de camp". Bourienne wrote about the investigation into the killing, saying "No one has found any trace of this sad event besides a jacket button in the dust of a hut, situated not far from Alkam. This button bears the number of the corps which provided his escort.". On 25 August Bonaparte ordered general Lanusse to retaliate for the massacre by pillaging then destroying the village. This operation was carried out by captain Joseph-Marie Moiret (Jullien's escort formed part of the 1st battalion of the regiment in which Moiret was serving) and it discovered the bloodied clothing of Jullien and his men in one of the houses. Moiret wrote in his memoirs:

On 9 fructidor (26 August) we were ordered to go burn this village, and give a brutal vengeance. We thus embarked at Boulaq on the Nile, and first landed at Alkam on the 11th, at 4.30 am. We found this village deserted - all the inhabitants, of whom those most to blame had been captured, had got to know the time of our arrival and fled; we were thus forced to content ourselves with destroying this place by fire. Nevertheless, the soldiers' fury was vented on an old man and an old woman in whose house they found bloodied French clothes, and on the pigeons in which all Egypt abounds. This was the only loot which we could get and bring back from this unlucky village.

These soldiers' bodies were rediscovered - Ida de St Elme mentions:

A flower of forgetfulness, gathered in the corner of the garden of the hotel in the Frankish quarter, against a kind of fence and a hedge, is cess-pit where it is said the brave chef de brigade Pinon was buried. I do not guarantee that this is the burial place of chef de brigade Pinon, although I have been assured it is: for this officer took part in an expedition against the inhabitants of Darfur, in Upper Egypt; and I have Siout's notes on the trip. He was killed, I believe, by a shot fired from a house in a stronghold village, fighting against the Arabs of Géama and El-Bcoutchi. I believe that it was general Jullien who was buried in the garden in the Frankish quarter of Cairo, and whose remains are so neglected and forgotten. We have hung a branch of laurel there.

Although bloodied weapons and uniforms were found at Alkam, it is very improbable that Jullien's corpse was rediscovered. The attack occurred on the Nile or its banks and the punitive expedition arrived twenty days after the events.

== Posthumous honours ==
The ancient Fort Rashid, commanding the boghâz of the River Nile at the river's junction with the Mediterranean, was renamed Fort Julien (or Fort Jullien in some sources) in his honour. It was in the course of fortifications work there that the Rosetta Stone was discovered. Faithful to Jullien's memory, Bonaparte set up a 0.63 metres (2.1 ft) high and 0.43 metres (1.4 ft) wide marble bust of him by Louis-Simon Boizot (1743–1809), executed in around 1803, in the salle des maréchaux, in the Tuileries throughout the First French Empire. This bust is now on show at the Trianon in the palace of Versailles. His brother, general and Comte d’Empire, commissioned five plaster copies, of which two were placed in Jullien's houses at Lapalud, two at Vannes (including one at the prefecture). O’Meara, Bonaparte's doctor on Saint Helena, declared in his memoirs that "the emperor loved [Jullien] greatly", whilst Bourienne's memoirs state he was a very worthy officer with great things ahead of him. All specialists on the First Empire agree that Jullien was a very talented officer who would probably have been promoted to Maréchal d’Empire by Napoleon had he not died in Egypt.
