= Auguste Jullien =

Marc Antoine Auguste Jullien (8 April 1802 - 29 September 1854) was a French diplomat and journalist.

== Life ==
He was born in Amiens as the eldest son of politician Jullien de Paris and a brother to the future bridge engineer Adolphe Jullien. From 1811 to 1816 Auguste Jullien studied under Pestalozzi in Yverdon, before living with his mother for two years in Lausanne, where his tutor was J.-E. Mieg, a collaborator of Pestalozzi's.

After studying law in Paris, he entered the staff of the Revue encyclopédique, whose director was his father. He edited it himself in 1829-1830 before joining Anselme Pétetin in 1831. Two years later he became chief editor of chief of Musée des familles on its first inception. He then edited another journal with Dupont de Bussac, Godefroy Cavaignac, Louis Blanc, Hippolyte Dussard, Gervais de Caen and others, before moving to le Temps, to which he contributed until 1842.

In 1848 he was working for la Semaine when he was sent to Frankfurt-am-Main as legation secretary.. When Henri Charles Savoye, the chargé d’affaires, was replaced, Jullien left that secretary role. In 1849, on the change of editor at Le Siècle, he joined it

Edmond Texier described him as "a man of merit and a knowledgeable journalist beneath a very modest exterior".

He died in the former 2nd arrondissement of Paris.

== Sources (in French) ==
- Edmond Texier, Biographie des Journalistes : Histoire des journaux, Paris, Pagnerre, 1850, p. 129-30.
