= Joseph-Victor Leclerc =

French scholar (1789–1865)

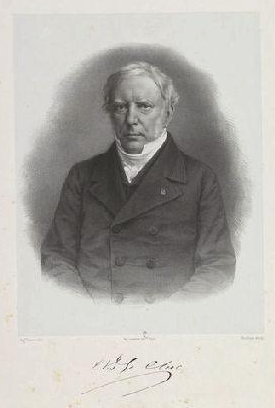
Joseph-Victor Le Clerc

Joseph-Victor Leclerc (1789, in Paris – 1865) was a French scholar. He was professor of rhetoric at the lycée Charlemagne, then maître de conferences (equivalent to docent) at the École normale, then professor of Latin speech (éloquence latine) at the Faculté des lettres de Paris, then dean of that Faculté (1832–65) and finally a member of the Institut de France (Académie des Inscriptions et Belles-Lettres, 1834).

He produced an annotated edition of the works of Montaigne in 1826, translated Cicero in thirty volumes (1821–25). He also wrote les Journaux chez les Romains (1838), Discours sur l’état des lettres en France au XIVe s. (1865) and several articles for Histoire littéraire de la France, published by the Académie des Inscriptions et Belles-Lettres.
