= Jean-Jacques-François Le Barbier =

French painter

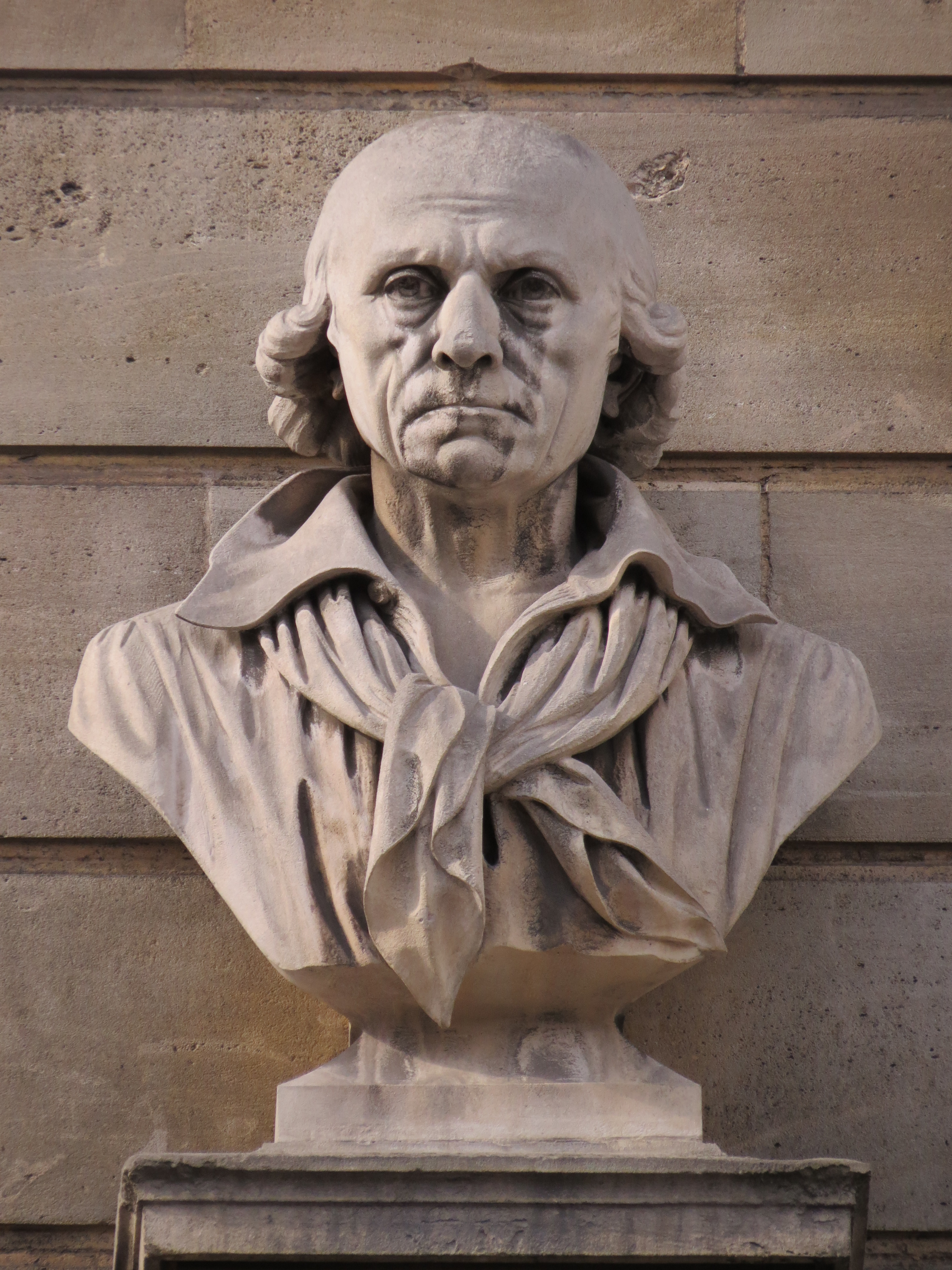
- Bust of Le Barbier (détail)
- Born: 11 November 1738; Rouen, France
- Died: 7 May 1826 (aged 87); Paris, France
- Known for: Painter, illustrator, writer and philosopher
- Notable work: Declaration of the Rights of Man and of the Citizen
- Movement: Orientalist

Jean-Jacques-François Le Barbier (French pronunciation: [ʒɑ̃ ʒak fʁɑ̃swa lə baʁbje]; 11 November 1738 – 7 May 1826) was a writer, illustrator and painter of French history. By 1780 he was an official painter of the King of France.

He was the father of artist Élise Bruyère.

== Work ==
His most famous work was a representation of the Declaration of the Rights of Man and of the Citizen made in 1789. He also designed the suite of tapestries of the four continents (1790–91).

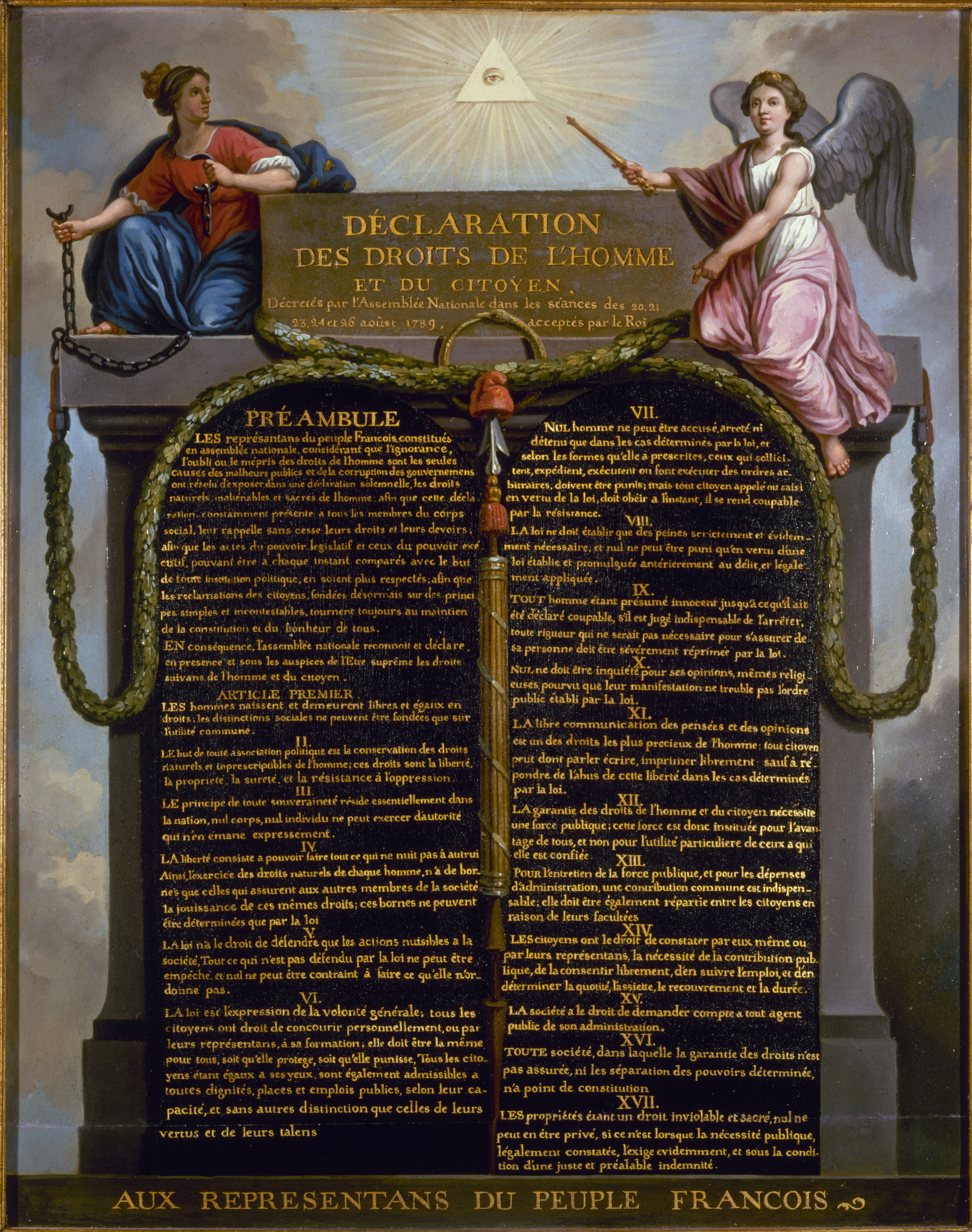
Le Barbier's Declaration of the Rights of Man and of the Citizen

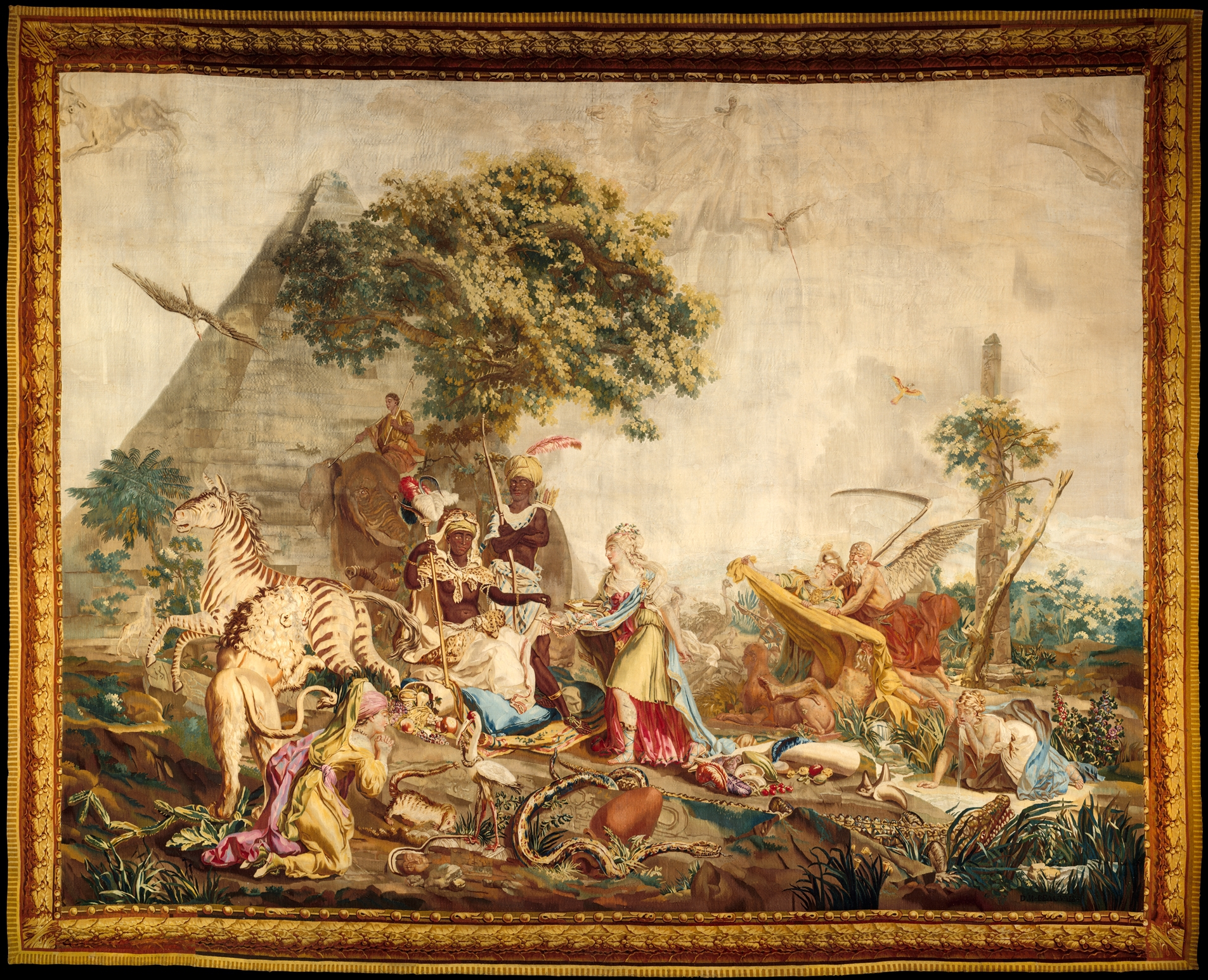
Africa from a set of The Four Continents

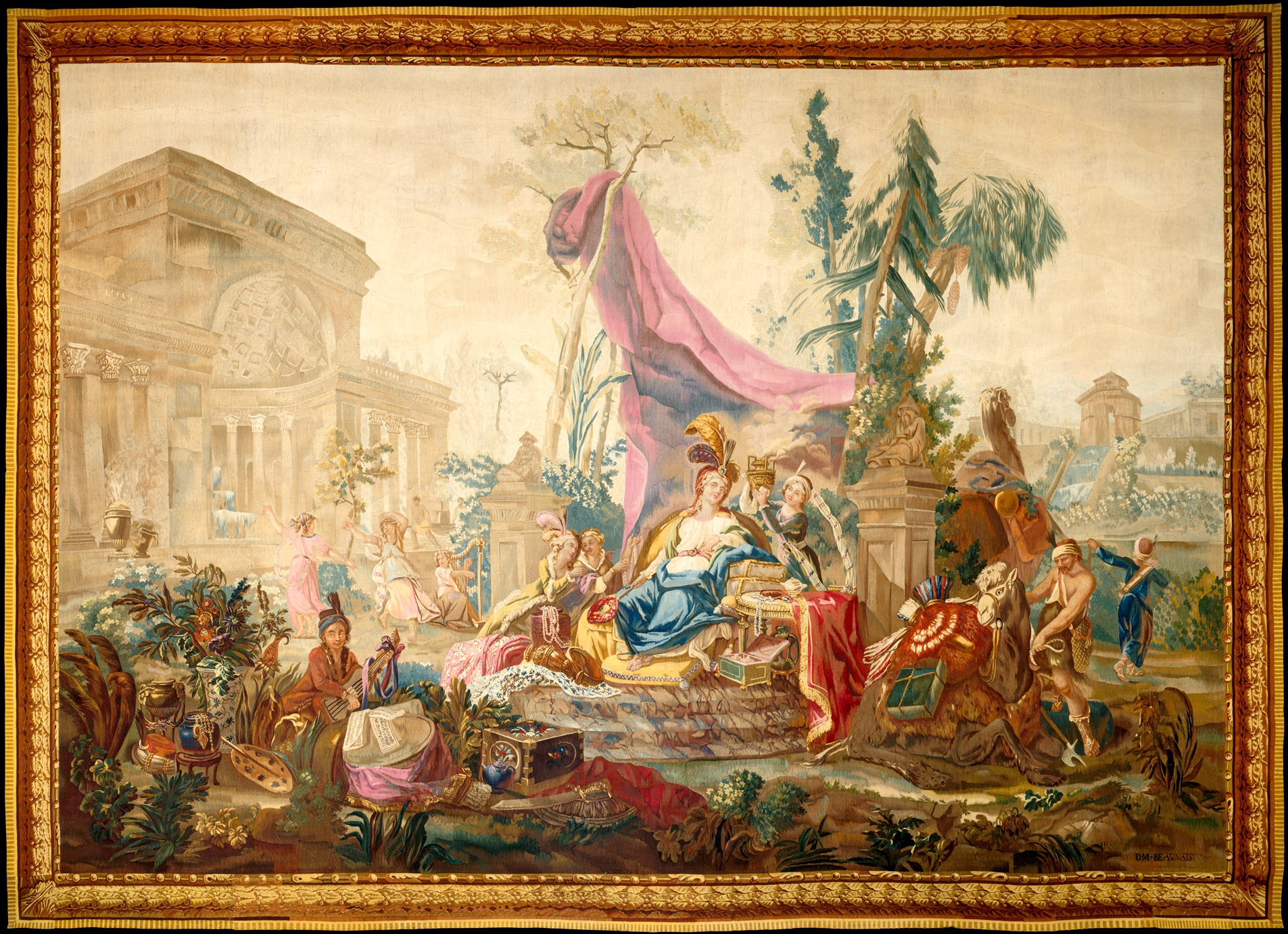
Asia from a set of The Four Continents

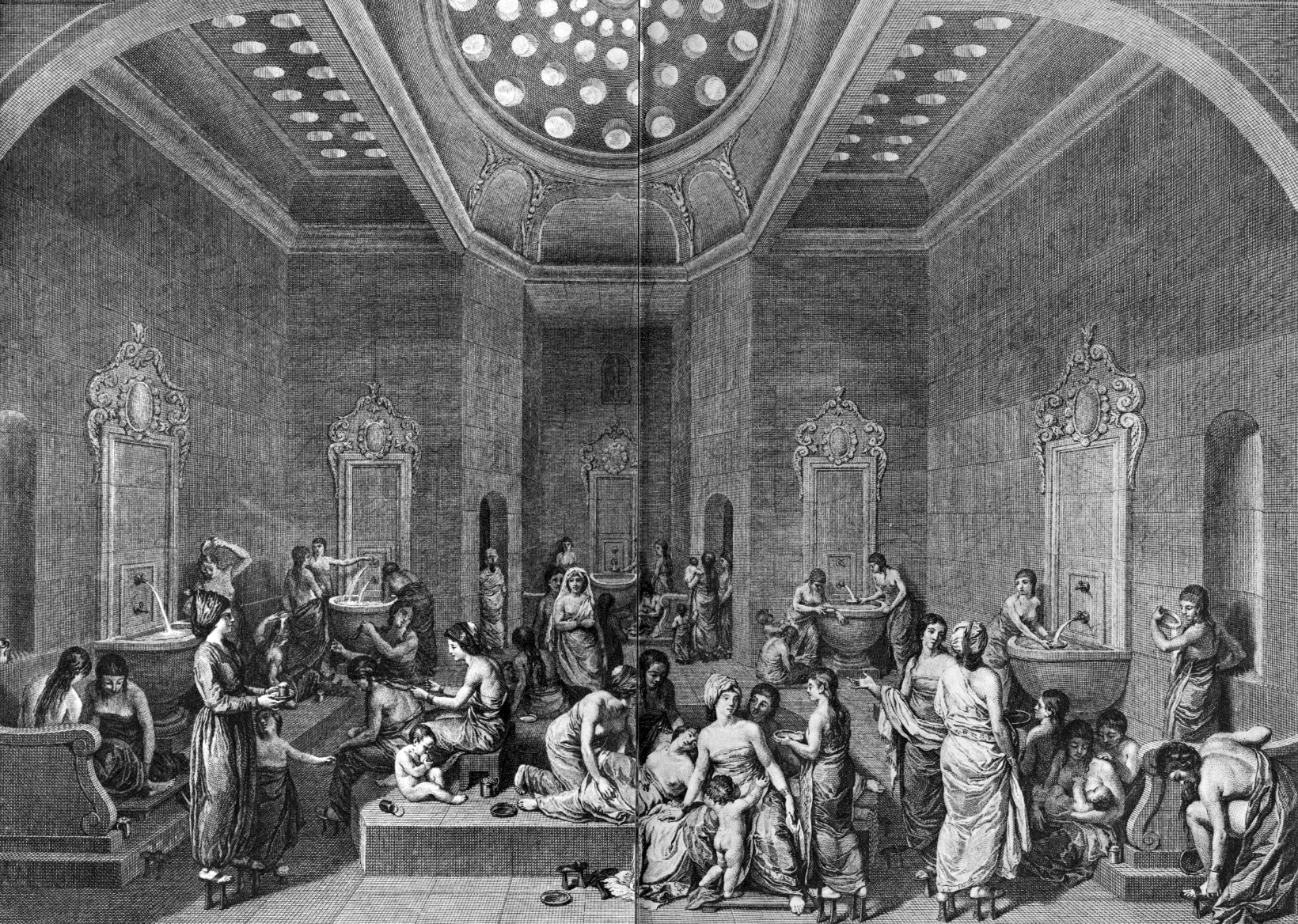
Turkish Bathscape 1785, illustration from the book, The Harem

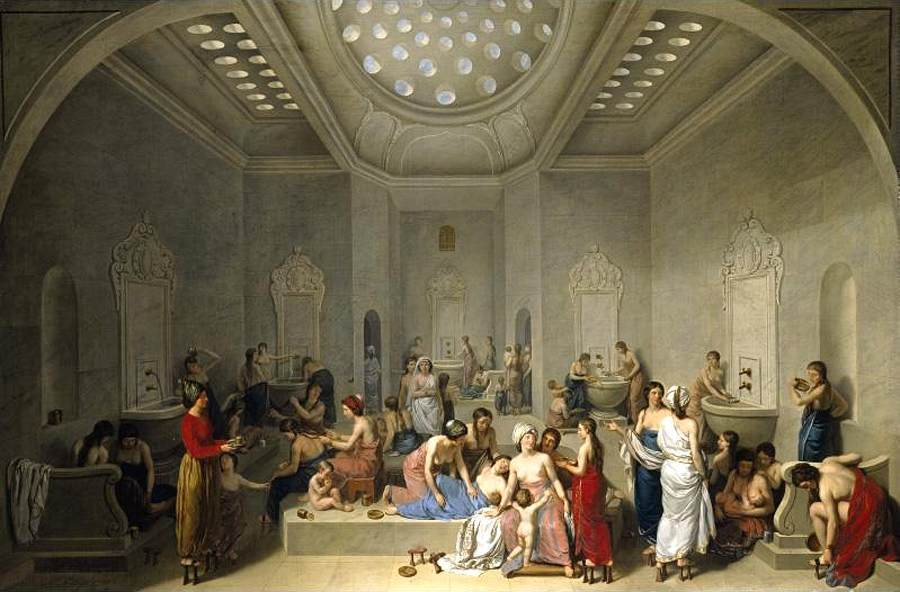
The Hammam 1785

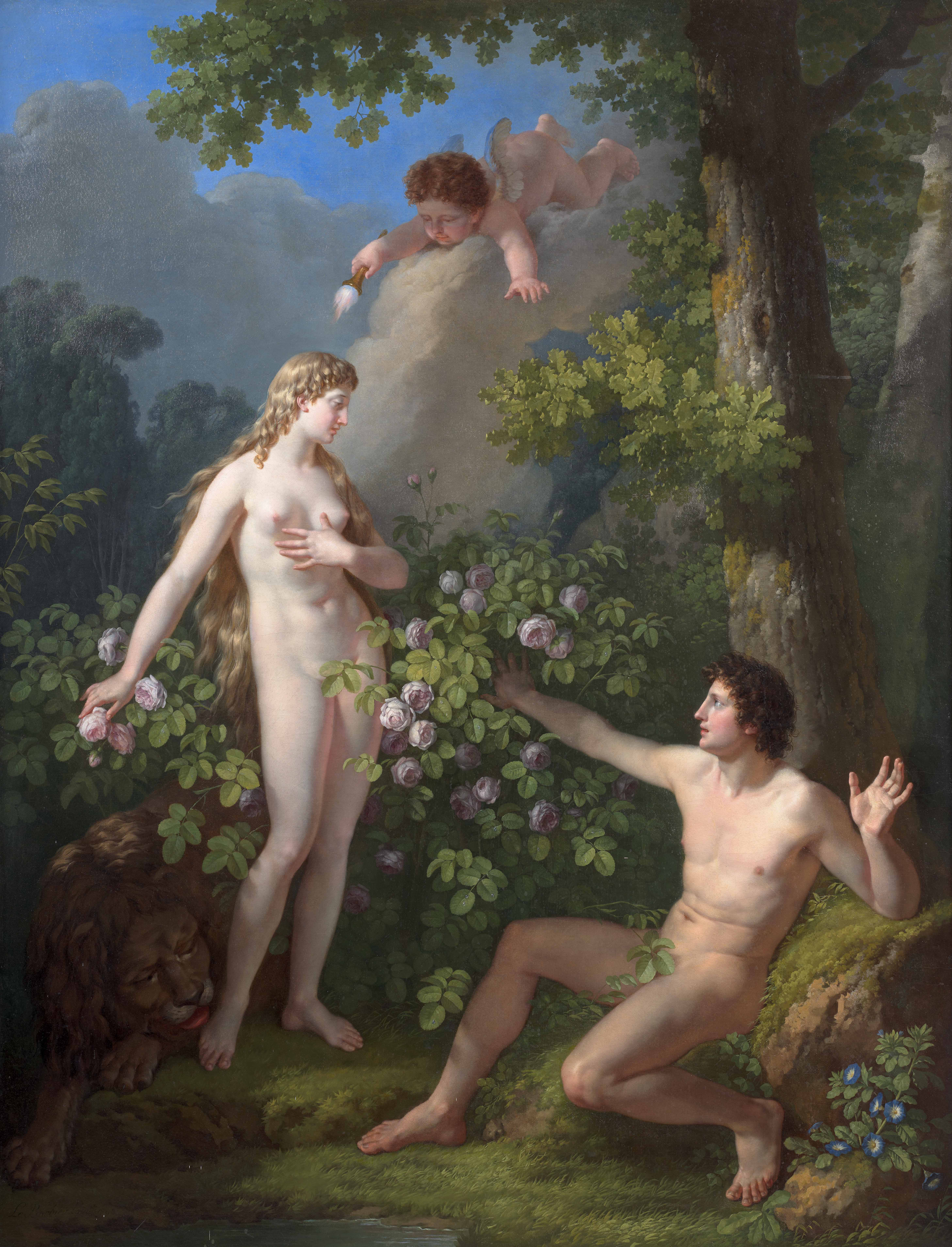
The First Man and the First Woman, 1798, exhibited at the Salon of 1801

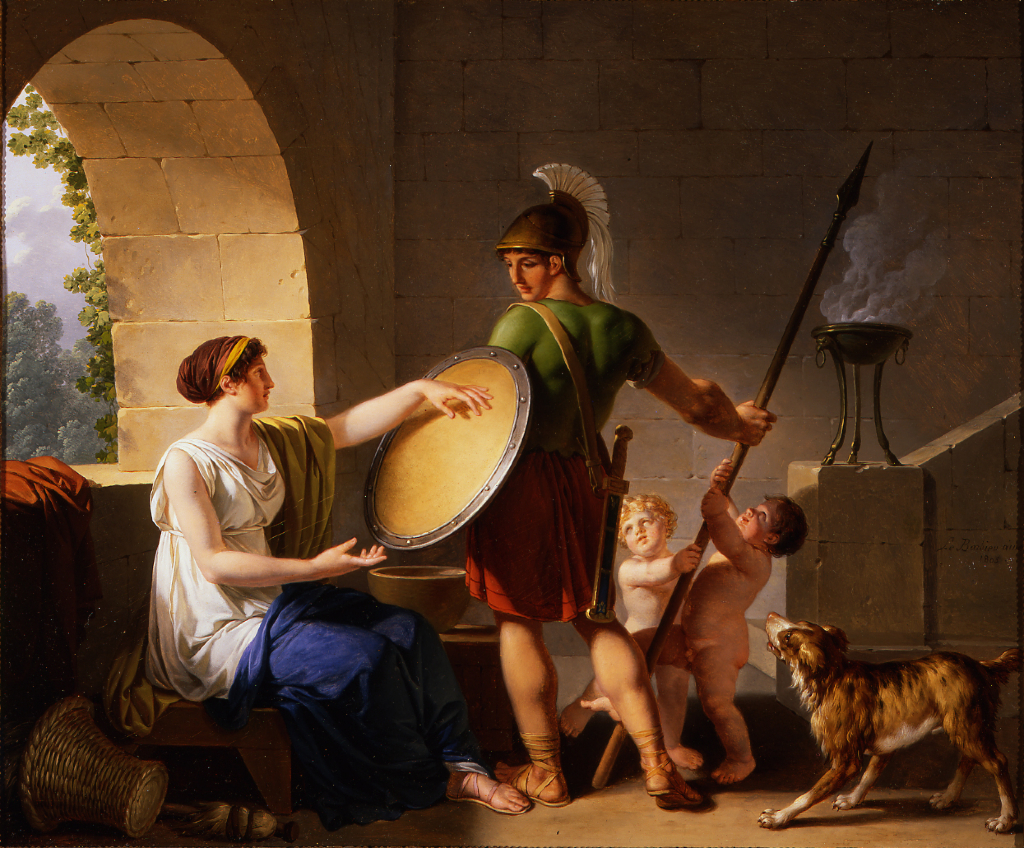
A Spartan Woman Giving a Shield to Her Son, before 1826

Select list of work

- Courage des femmes de Sparte se défendant contre les Messéniens, Musée du Louvre, Paris;
- Étude de femme en fureur, Musée Magnin de Dijon;
- Henri IV et Sully à Fontainebleau, Musée des beaux-arts de Pau;
- Jupiter endormi sur le mont Ida, École nationale supérieure des beaux-arts de Paris;
- La Grotte d’Égérie, Musée des beaux-arts de Rouen;
- Le Vieux Mari, Musée Cantini de Marseille;
- Les Amants surpris, Musée Cantini de Marseille;
- Martyre de saint Sébastien, Musée des beaux-arts de Rouen;
- Scène d’Amérique du Nord, Musée des beaux-arts de Rouen;
- Un Canadien et sa femme pleurant sur le tombeau de leur enfant, Musée des beaux-arts de Rouen, tableau interprété en gravure par François Robert Ingouf;
- Le Courage héroïque du jeune Désilles, le 31 août 1790, à l'Affaire de Nancy, Vizille, musée de la Révolution française;
- L'Apothéose de Rameau, Musée d'art et d'histoire de Toul;
- Portrait de Madame Roland, Musée d'art de Toulon;
- L'Apothéose de Lulli, Musée d'Art et d'histoire de Toul;
- La Déclaration des droits de l'homme et du citoyen de 1789, Musée Carnavalet, Paris.
