= Marc-Antoine Jullien de Paris =

French revolutionary and man of letters (1775-1848)

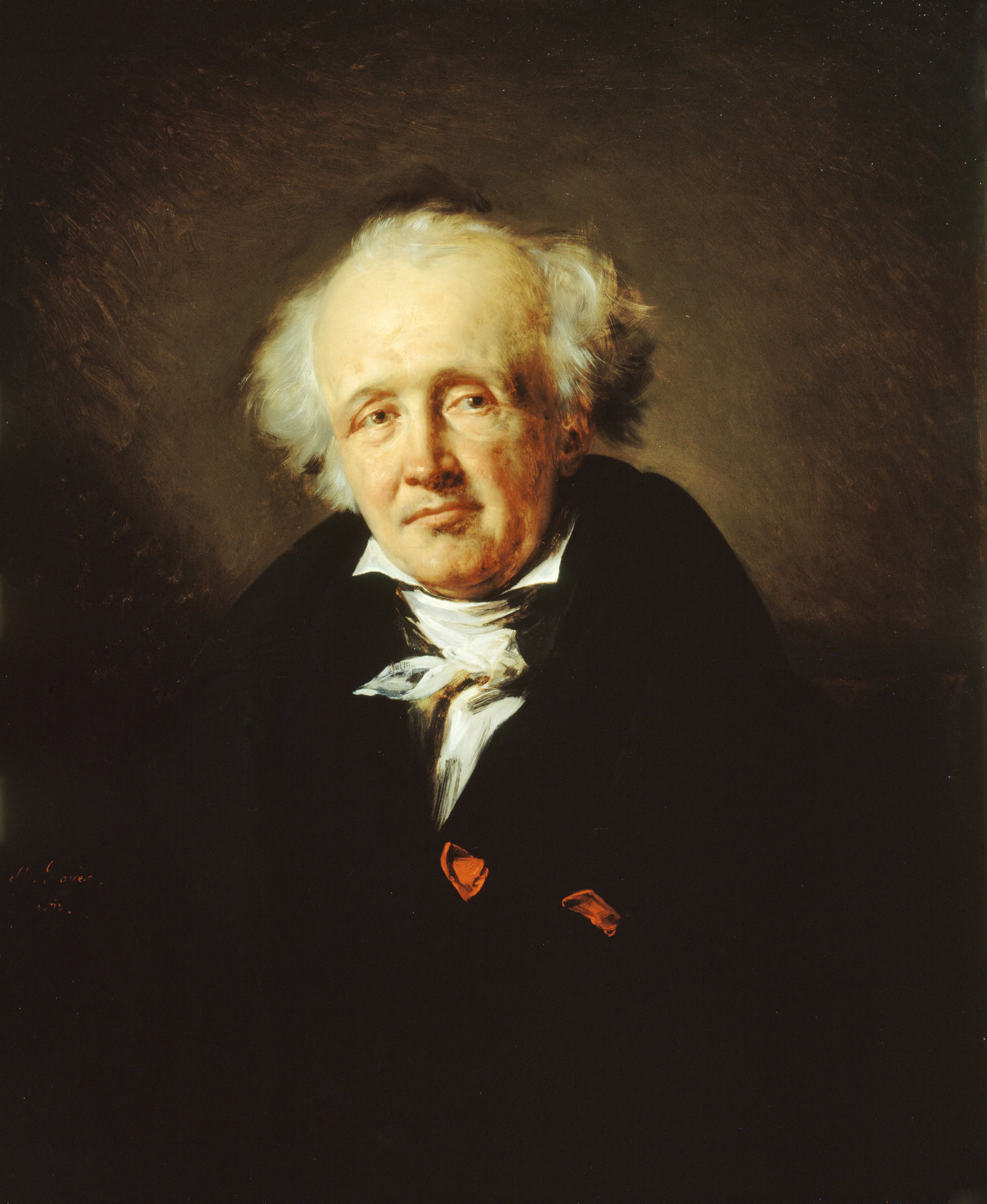
Portrait by Aimée Brune-Pagès (1832), Musée Carnavalet

Marc-Antoine Jullien, called Jullien fils (March 10, 1775 in Paris – April 4, 1848 in Paris) was a French revolutionary and man of letters.

== Life ==
Son of Marc Antoine Jullien, deputy from Drôme in the National Convention, and his wife Rosalie, he entered the Collège de Navarre in 1785; his studies were interrupted by the beginning of the Revolution. Encouraged by his ardently patriotic mother, Rosalie Ducrolay, named "Madame Jullien", he attempted a career in journalism, in 1790 becoming a collaborator on the Journal du Soir. The following year, he became a member of the Jacobin Club, in which he became an opponent of war.

In the spring of 1792, Jullien was sent to London by the Marquis de Condorcet, at the time president of the comité diplomatique of the Legislative Assembly. There he served as a student-diplomat, becoming an intermediary between the more liberal English factions and the Girondists. Among those he met there were Talleyrand and Lord Stanhope. Returning to France that autumn, he was named aide-commissaire and then commissaire des guerres, of the army of the Pyrenees, in January 1793. He was soon transferred to Tarbes "due to age". He rejoined the army of the Pyrenees on April 16, entering Paris with them on August 4.

Jullien then became a protégé of Robespierre, and was sent by the Committee of Public Safety on a mission to several Atlantic ports, beginning on September 10, 1793. Charged with ensuring surveillance of the military situation and of Jacobin propaganda, he attempted to gain for himself a rapport with public feeling. In Nantes, on February 4, 1794, he wrote a letter to Robespierre in which he denounced Carrier. At Bordeaux, he stood in opposition to Jean-Lambert Tallien and his mistress, Thérésa Cabarrús. He left Bordeaux to return to Paris on April 24, 1794; there he was named to the Executive Committee on Public Instruction. On May 18, he returned to Bordeaux, to purify the municipality and the Jacobin Club and seek out secret Girondists among the deputies.

Jullien would likely have become a major player in the Revolution had it not been for the execution of Robespierre on 28 July 1794. Made destitute, he was arrested on August 10 and sent to prison; he would be held at the maison de santé of Notre-Dame-des-Champs, Paris, and would testify at Carrier's trial. He disavowed his association with Robespierre and was released, through the intervention of his father, on October 14, 1795. Ten days later, the insurrection of 13 Vendémiaire was stopped.

Jullien next became one of the founders of the Club du Panthéon, returning to journalism with the creation of L'Orateur plébéien, a democratic and moderate pamphlet, with Ève Demaillot and Jean-Jacques Leuliette. On March 13, 1796, Merlin de Douai helped him enter the Ministère de la Police, where he became responsible for lists of emigrants. He soon became suspected of Babouvist sympathies, and was forced to hide after the discovery of the Conspiracy of Equals in May 1796; he reappeared in October of the same year.

Jullien next joined the Army of Italy, becoming a writer for its mail service from August to November 1797. He then accompanied Napoleon Bonaparte, in May 1798, on his journey to Egypt. There he became ill, and returned to France. Becoming well, he entered the service of general Championnet, becoming an adviser on December 28, 1798. Among the initiators of the Neapolitan Republic, he became secretary general to Championnet's provisional government on January 26, 1799. He was quickly recalled by the Directory, and was arrested on February 24. On March 12 he stood before a military tribunal, but was freed by the Coup of 30 Prairial Year VII on June 18.

Accommodating the coup of 18 Brumaire to satisfaction, Jullien proposed a plan to unify the Italian states in July 1800. Immediately becoming indignant at anti-Jacobin proscriptions, following the Plot of the Rue Saint-Nicaise he was relegated to handling administrative functions in Paris. He received the cross of the Légion d'honneur in 1803. After a visit to Madame de Staël at Chaumont-sur-Loire, through which he raised Napoleon's suspicions, he was sent to the Kingdom of Italy in 1810; while passing through Yverdon, he became acquainted with the Swiss pedagogue Johann Heinrich Pestalozzi.

In 1813. Jullien was jailed due to his opposition to the Empire. Freed during the Bourbon Restoration, he published numerous opposition journals between 1815 and 1817, becoming known in the process as a pedagogue. He corresponded regularly with Pestalozzi, to whom he sent his first three sons, at Yverdon, and became a promoter of the Monitorial System of education. In 1819 he founded Revue encyclopédique.

He was elected to the American Philosophical Society in 1830.

Jullien died in Paris in 1848, aged 73.

== Marriage and family ==
In 1801 Jullien married Sophie-Juvence Nioche (died 1832); they had six children.

The eldest of the six, Pierre-Adolphe (born Amiens, February 13, 1803 - died 1873) was a technician, later becoming engineer-in-chief of the Corps of Bridges and Roads; in this capacity he oversaw construction of the Paris-Lyon railroad. Another son, Auguste, was a journalist.

Also among the six, their daughter Antoinette-Stéphanie married the dramatist Lockroy and was the mother of Édouard Lockroy.

== Works ==
- Discours adressé a l'assemblée électorale du département de la Drome, séante a Valence, et prononcé dans une assemblée des Amis de la constitution de ladite ville, le 30 août 1791, 1791
- Opinion de Marc antoine Jullien sur le jugement de Louis XVI, 1793, 4 p.
- Rapport des opérations faites à Vannes (with Pierre-Louis Prieur), 1793
- Une mission en Vendée 1793, 1893, i.e. 1793
- Adresse lue au nom des Jacobins de Paris, par Marc-Antoine Jullien, membre de la commission exécutive de l'instruction publique à la barre de la Convention nationale, dans la séance du 27 floréal. Réponse du président de la Convention. Discours prononcé par le citoyen Couthon, représentant du peuple, 1794
- M.A. Jullien, membre de la Commission exécutive de l'instruction publique, a ses frères & amis de la Société populaire de La Rochelle, 1794
- Discours sur les dangers de la contagion du modérantisme, & les moyens de former l'esprit public, lu dans la séance du Club national de Bordeaux le 2 floréal de l'an deuxième de la République française, une & indivisible, 1794
- Adresse des républicains, de la ville de Toulouse, aux représentans du peuple français, 1794
- Adresse du Club national de Bordeaux, aux sociétés populaires affiliées des différentes communes de la République. Proposée et rédigée, le 21 germinal, l'an deuxième de la République, 1794
- Marc-Antoine Jullien aux représentans du peuple composant le Comité de Salut public: rapport de ma mission à Bordeaux : Paris, ce 24 thermidor an 9 second de la République française, 1794
- Entretien politique sur la situation actuelle de la France, et sur les plans du nouveau gouvernement, 1799
- Appel aux véritables amis de la patrie, de la liberté et de la paix, ou, Tableau des principaux résultats de l'Administration des Consuls et des ressources actuelles de la République française, 1801, 187 p.
- Essai sur l'emploi du tems; ou, Méthode qui a pour objet de bien régler sa vie, premier moyen d'être heureux; destinée spécialement à l'usage des jeunes gens de 15 à 25 ans, 1810
- Esprit de la méthode d'éducation de Pestalozzi, suivie et pratiquée dans l'Institut d'Éducation d'Yverdun, en Suisse, 1812
- Quelques fragmens extraits du porte-feuille politique de Buonaparte ou mémoires sur les intérêts politiques de l'Italie et sur ceux de la France, 1814, 52 p.
- Quelques réflexions sur l'esprit qui doit inspirer les écrivains politiques, amis de la patrie et du roi, et diriger les membres des collèges électoraux dans le choix des nouveaux députés. (Douze août 1815), 1815, 14 p.
- Esquisse et vues préliminaires d'un ouvrage sur l'éducation comparée, et séries de questions sur l'éducation, 1817, 56 p.
- Esquisse d'un essai sur la philosophie des sciences, contenant un nouveau projet d'une division générale des connoissances humaines, 1819
- Tableau synoptique des connoissances humaines, d'après une nouvelle méthode de classification, 1819
- Esquisse d'un plan de lectures historiques, rapporté spécialement a l'influence des femmes, considérée dans les différens siècles et chez les différentes nations suivie de deux pièces des vers, relatives au meme sujet, 1821
- Essai sur l'emplois du tems, ou, Méthode qui a pour objet de bien régler sa vie, premier moyen d'être heureux, d'estinée specialement a l'usage des jeunes gens, 1824
- Coup d'œil sur les progrès des connaissances humaines, en 1824, 1824, 21 p.
- La France en 1825 ou mes regrets et mes espérances: discours en vers, 1825, 151 p.
- Épître à Mr. Vandernat, ancien ministre de la République Batave, retiré dans une solitude philosophique auprès d'Arnhem, 1826
- Notice biographique sur Marc-Antoine Jullien : précédée d'un coup d'œil sur la situation politique et les besoins de la France et suivie de documents inédits, de lettres et de pièces jutificatives, 1831, 73 p.
- Lettre a la nation Anglaise, sur l'union des peuples et la civilisation comparée, sur l'instrument économique du tems, appelé biomètre, ou montre morale suivie de quelques poésies, et d'un discours en vers sur les principaux savans, littérateurs, poëtes et artistes, qu'a produits la Grande-Bretagne, 1833, 50 p.
- Essai général d'éducation physique, morale et intellectuelle. Suivi d'un plan d'éducation pratique pour l'enfance, l'adolescence et la jeunesse, ou recherches sur les principes d'une éducation perfectionnée..., 1835, 494 p.
- Exposé de la méthode d'éducation de Pestalozzi, telle qu'elle a été pratiquée sous sa direction pendant dix années de 1806 à 1816 dans l'institut d'Yverdun, en Suisse, 1842
- Le congrès scientifique d'Italie: Réuni à Milan, le 12 September 1844, 1844
- À l'Angleterre savante et littéraire..., 1845
- Une mission en Vendée, 1793, notes [by M. A. Jullien] recueillies par É. Lockroy, 1893

== Sources ==
- François Wartelle, « Jullien Marc-Antoine, dit Jullien de Paris », in Albert Soboul, Dictionnaire historique de la Révolution française, Paris, Presses universitaires de France, 1989 (rééd. Quadrige, 2005, p. 609-610)
- Philippe Le Bas, France, dictionnaire encyclopédique, Paris, Firmin Didot frères, 1843, tome 9, p. 757-758
- Jean-Chrétien Ferdinand Hoefer, Nouvelle biographie générale depuis les temps les plus reculés jusqu'à nos jours, Paris, Firmin Didot frères, 1858, tome 27, p. 225-231
- Jules Michelet, Histoire de la Révolution française

== Bibliography ==
- Michèle Benaiteau, « Marc Antoine Jullien de Paris (1789 1848). Une biographie politique. », in Annales historiques de la Révolution française, n° 323
- Marie-Claude Delieuvin, Marc-Antoine Jullien, de Paris, 1775-1848 : théoriser et organiser l'éducation, Paris, L'Harmattan, 2003, 380 pages ISBN 2-7475-5033-8
- Eugenio Di Rienzo, Marc-Antoine Jullien de Paris (1789–1848), una Biografia Politica, Éditions Guida, 1999, 346 pages ISBN 88-7188-399-3
- Pierre Gascar, L'ombre de Robespierre : L'activité de Marc-Antoine Jullien pendant la Grande Terreur, Paris, Gallimard, 1979, 325 pages ISBN 2-07-028620-7
- Jacqueline Gautherin, « Marc-Antoine Jullien de Paris (1775-1848) », Perspectives: Revue trimestrielle d'éducation comparée, vol. XXIII, n° 3-4, 1993, p. 783-798
- Helmut Goetz, Claude Cuénot, Marc-Antoine Jullien de Paris, 1775-1848: l'évolution spirituelle d'un révolutionnaire. Contribution à l'histoire de précurseurs des organisations internationales du XX e siècle, Institut Pedagogique National, 1962, 267 p.
- Marcel Postic, Carrier et la Terreur à Nantes, Paris, L'Harmattan, 2001, 302 pages ISBN 2-7475-0171-X
- Pierre Serna, La république des girouettes (1789-1815 et au-delà), une anomalie politique de l'extrême centre, Paris, Champ Vallon, 2005, 570 pages, p. 276-284 ISBN 2-87673-413-3
- Notice biographique sur Marc Antoine Jullien, de Paris, précédée d'un coup d'œil sur la situation politique et les besoins de la France, et suivie de documents inédits, de lettres et de pièces justificatives, Paris, Sédillot, 1831, 73 p.
- Procès-verbaux du Comité d'instruction publique de la Convention nationale, Imprimerie nationale, Paris, 1891–1958, 7 books in 8 volumes, book 4, p. 210-214.
