= Adolphe Regnier =

French philologist (1804–1884)

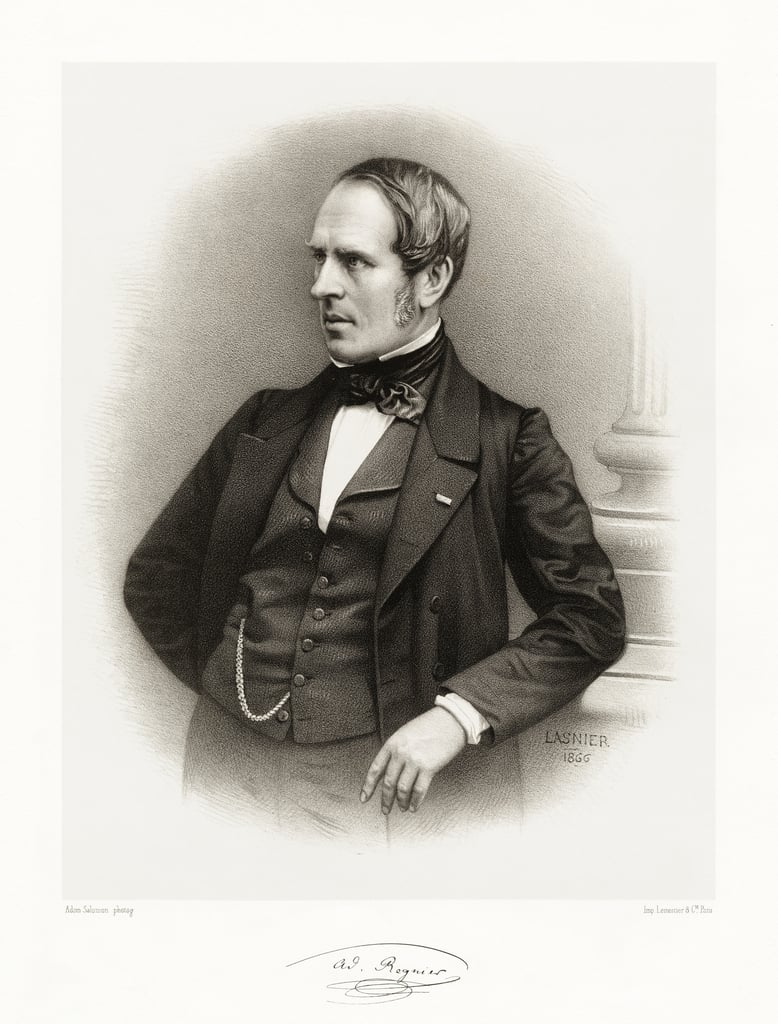
Adolphe Régnier

Adolphe Regnier (born Jacques-Auguste-Adolphe Regnier) (7 July 1804, Mainz – 20 October 1884, Fontainebleau) was a French philologist.

== Life and career ==
From 1823 he was a teacher at various institutes of higher education in France, including from 1838 as a professor of rhetoric at the Collège de France and as teacher of German language and literature at the École normal supérieure in Paris (1841-43).

In 1843 he was appointed preceptor to Prince Philippe, Count of Paris by Louis-Philippe, whom he also accompanied into exile after the February Revolution of 1848. Back in Paris in 1853, he was accepted into the Académie des inscriptions et belles-lettres in 1855 and became the director of the "Collection des grands écrivains de la France" (being succeeded after his death in that position by Gustave Lanson). He was also proposed by the Institut de France as professor of Sanskrit at the Collège de France in 1862, which he did not accept.

In 1873 he was appointed librarian of the Palace of Fontainebleau, where he died eleven years later. His son Adolphe Regnier (1834-1875) was also a librarian and scholar.

== Bibliography ==
Regnier made a great contribution to the knowledge of the German language and literature in France through the Cours complet de langue allemande (with Lebas, 7 vols., 1830-33) and through his translations of Goethe's Iphigenia (1843) and all of Schiller's works (8 vols., 1860–62, with biography) into French. He achieved particular fame through his Étude sur l'idiome des Védas et les origines de la langue sanscrite (first printed in the Journal asiatique, and then as a monograph, Paris, 1855) and an edition of the Prâtiçâkhya du Rig-veda (3 vols., Paris 1857-59, with a French translation, commentary and an "Etude sur la grammaire védique"). He also translated Euripides’ Hecuba (1838) into French and wrote the linguistic work Traité de la formation et de la composition des mots dans la langue grecque (1855).

== Honours ==
- 1841 : Chevalier de la Légion d'honneur
- 1875 : Officier de la Légion d'honneur
- 1877 : Prix Archon-Despérouses of the Académie française
