= Rosalie Jullien =

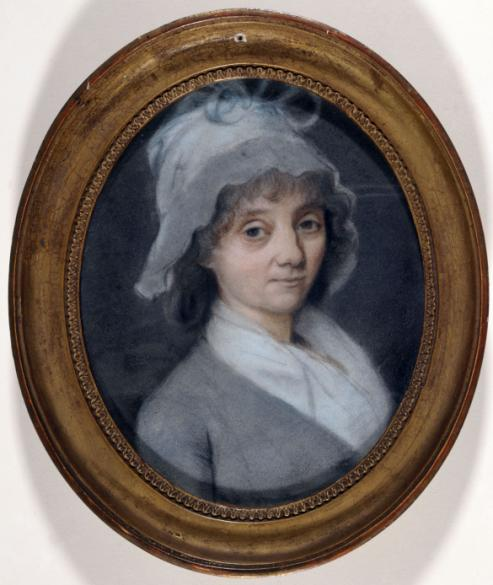
Portrait of Madame Rosalie Jullien, pastel and charcoal drawing, Musée Carnavalet.

Rosalie Jullien (née Ducrollay; 9 September 1745 - 28 April 1824) was a French diarist and letter writer.

== Life ==
Born in Pontoise to a wealthy family, she belonged to the mercantile and urban bourgeoisie. In 1774 she married Marc-Antoine Jullien (known as Jullien de la Drôme), a future Jacobin member of parliament for Drôme at the National Convention. It was celebrated almost clandestinely in Paris - he came from a business family in the Dauphiné. They had three children:

- Marc-Antoine Jullien de Paris, known as Jules, friend of Maximilien Robespierre
- Bernard, died aged 16 months
- Auguste (born September 1779)

In 1785, aged ten, Marc-Antoine junior was placed in a college in Paris, to which his father accompanied him. Marc-Antoine and Rosalie were often separated and during those periods Rosalie came to Paris to be close to their son. There she followed the meetings of the National Assembly and wrote them down the same day.

While she was in Pizançon she managed their properties and raised silkworms. Rosalie wrote to her husband, who was always busy with politics. She was highly educated, read English and Italian, cited Molière, Racine, La Fontaine and Latin and Italian authors. She knew Rousseau very well and left a large collection of letters, partly published in 1881 by her great-grandson Édouard Lockroy.

Rosalie and Marc Antoine retired to their estates in Pizançon and Chatuzange-le-Goubet in 1810 - she died two years after her husband and is buried with him at the cimetière du Père-Lachaise.

== Bibliography (in French) ==
- Édouard Lockroy, Journal d'une bourgeoise pendant la Révolution, 1791-1793, Édition : Paris : Calmann Lévy, 1881
- Annie Duprat, Les Affaires d’État sont mes affaires de cœur : Rosalie Jullien, une femme dans la Révolution. Lettres, 1773-1810, Belin, 560 p., 2016
