= Conseil général des ponts et chaussées =

The Conseil général des Ponts et Chaussées (CGPC "Civil Engineering General Council") is one of the oldest institutions in France and the direct heir of the assembly of inspectors general of bridges and roads, which met regularly from 1747 under Daniel-Charles Trudaine. The Conseil was set up on 25 August 1804 by decree.

It has been reorganized into the Conseil général de l'environnement et du développement durable.
