= The Childhood of Saint John the Baptist =

1450 painting by Sano di Pietro

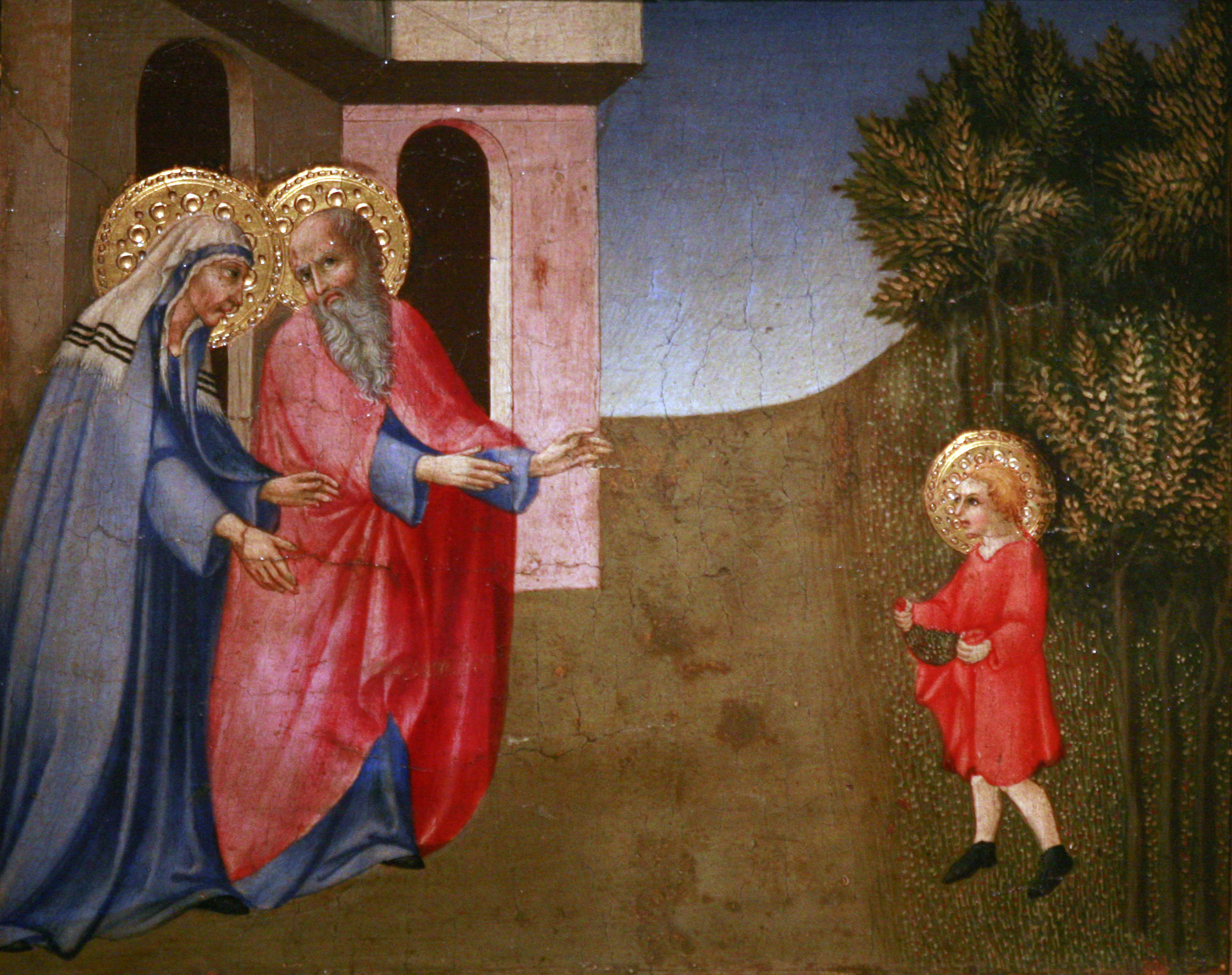
The Childhood of Saint John the Baptist by Sano di Pietro

The Childhood of Saint John the Baptist or Saint John the Baptist Meets his Parents is a 1450 oil on panel painting by Sano di Pietro, showing John the Baptist, Zacharias and Elizabeth.

It may show him getting back home after a brief absence or leaving to become a prophet in the desert. It comes from the predella of an altarpiece - fragments of that altarpiece are now in Budapest and Moscow. In 2009 Ann L. Oppenheimer left it to its present owner, the Musée des Beaux-Arts de Strasbourg.

== External links (in French) ==
- L'Enfance de saint Jean-Baptiste, National Institute of Art History (France)
- Saint John the Baptist meets his parents; The Childhood of Saint John the Baptist, Ministry of Culture (France)
