= The Angel of the Annunciation =

1440s painting by Sano di Pietro

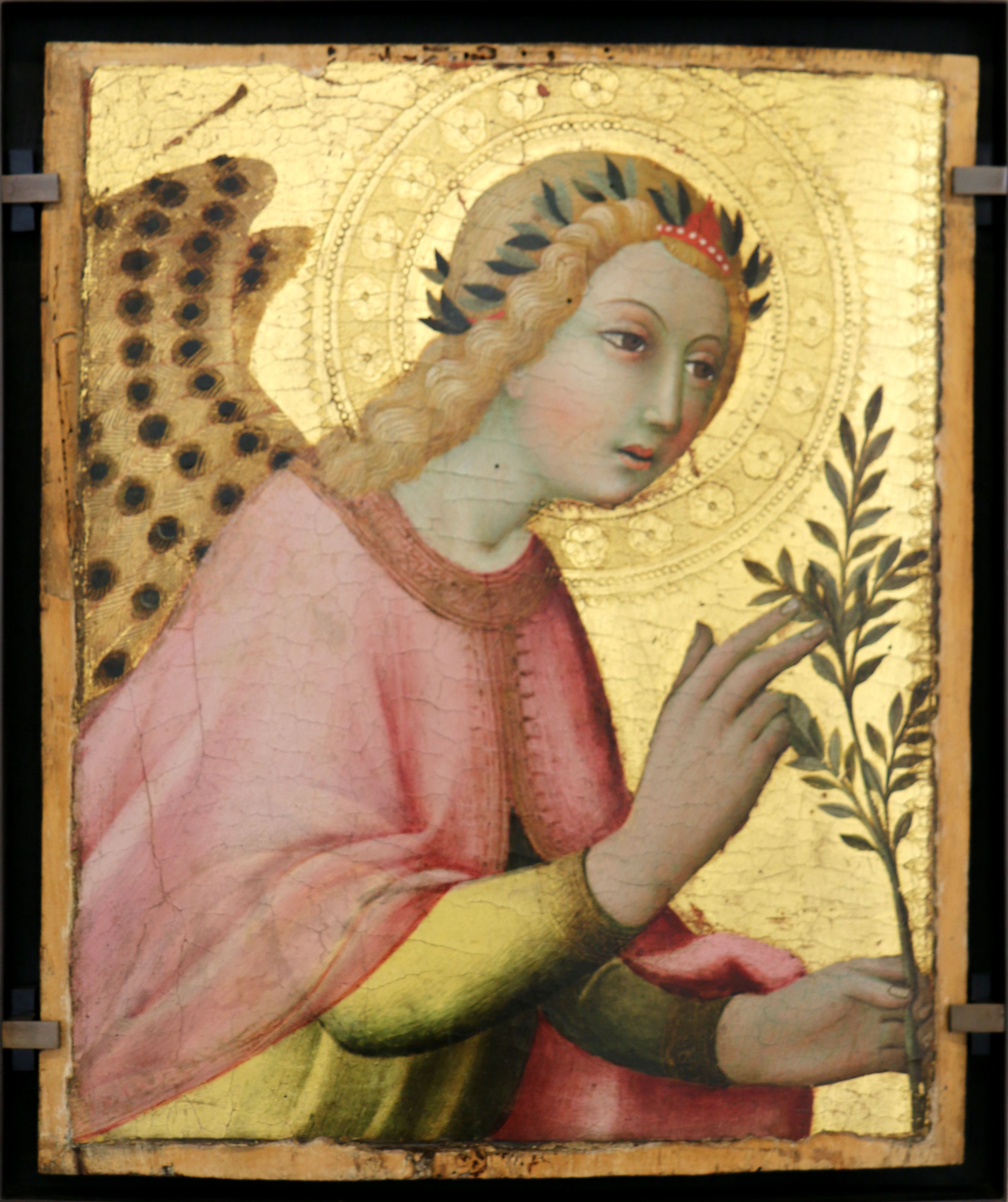
The Angel of the Annunciation by Sano di Pietro

The Angel of the Annunciation is a 1440s tempera and gold-leaf on poplar panel painting by Sano di Pietro, now in the Musée du Petit Palais in Avignon. It probably formed the left wing of a diptych, with the former right panel of the Virgin Mary in the Duke of Norfolk's collection at Arundel Castle.

He holds an olive branch rather than the more usual lily. He also wears an olive crown, whilst his wings are in peacock feathers. It was bought for the French national collection (specifically for the musée Napoléon III) in 1861 from the Campana collection. It was restored in 1968 and then assigned to its present home in 1976.

== External links (in French) ==
- Notice du musée
