= Gesuati Altarpiece =

1444 painting by Sano di Pietro

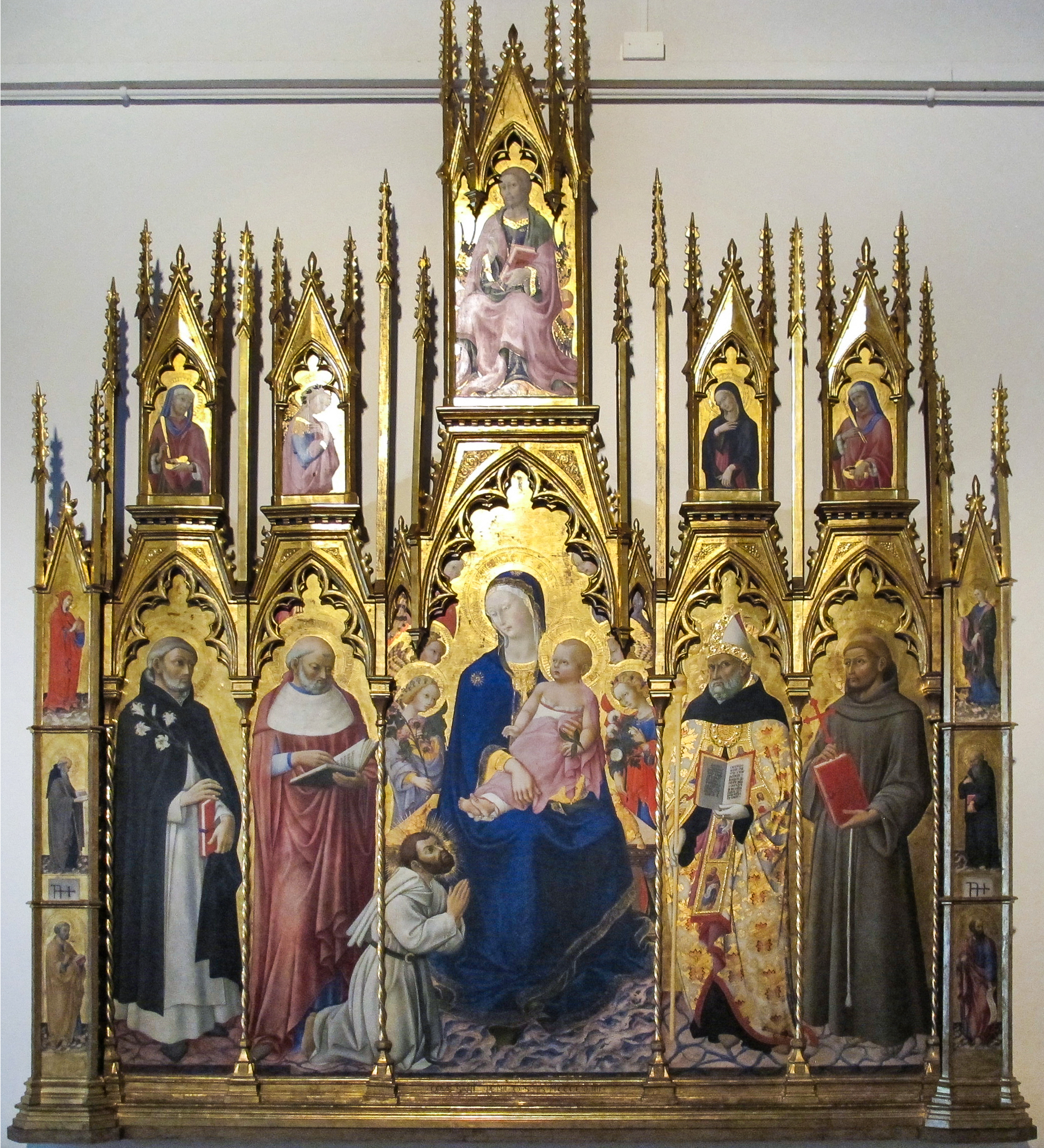

The Gesuati Altarpiece is a 1444 tempera and gold on poplar panel altarpiece by Sano di Pietro, produced for San Girolamo, a Jesuati monastery in Siena. Most of its panels are now in the Pinacoteca Nazionale in Siena, although the six panels of the predella showing scenes from the life of Saint Jerome were lost to the Campana collection, later bought for the Musée Napoléon III, later part of the Louvre Museum, where these panels still hang.

The main panel shows the Madonna and Child enthroned flanked by six angels, with Blessed Giovanni Colombini (founder of the Jesuati order) kneeling in prayer before them. Beside it are four panels with full length figures of Saint Dominic, Saint Jerome, Augustine of Hippo and Francis of Assisi. Down the outer left-hand edge are three panels showing (from bottom to top) saints Peter, Anthony Abbot and Mary Magdalene, with an equivalent set down the right-hand edge James the Great, Ephrem the Syrian and Catherine of Alexandria.

The central top register shows Christ the Redeemer enthroned and blessing, flanked by double pairs of seraphim with coloured wings. Either side are four more panels showing an Annunciation and Saints Cosmas and Damian. The predella scenes show (from left to right) Jerome's dream, Jerome's penitence, Jerome taking the thorn from the lion's paw, Jerome's death and Cyril of Jerusalem's vision of Jerome.

== Predella (Louvre) ==
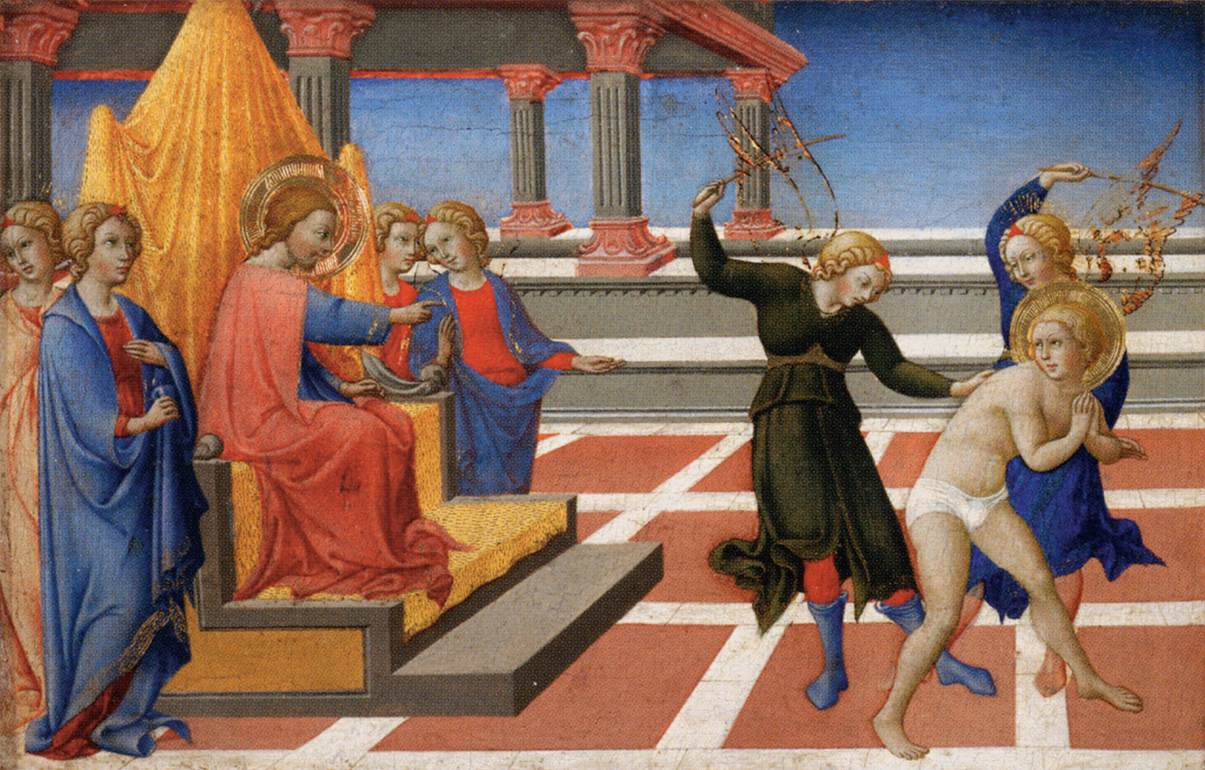
Saint Jerome Dreams that he is Whipped by Two Angels on Christ's Orders

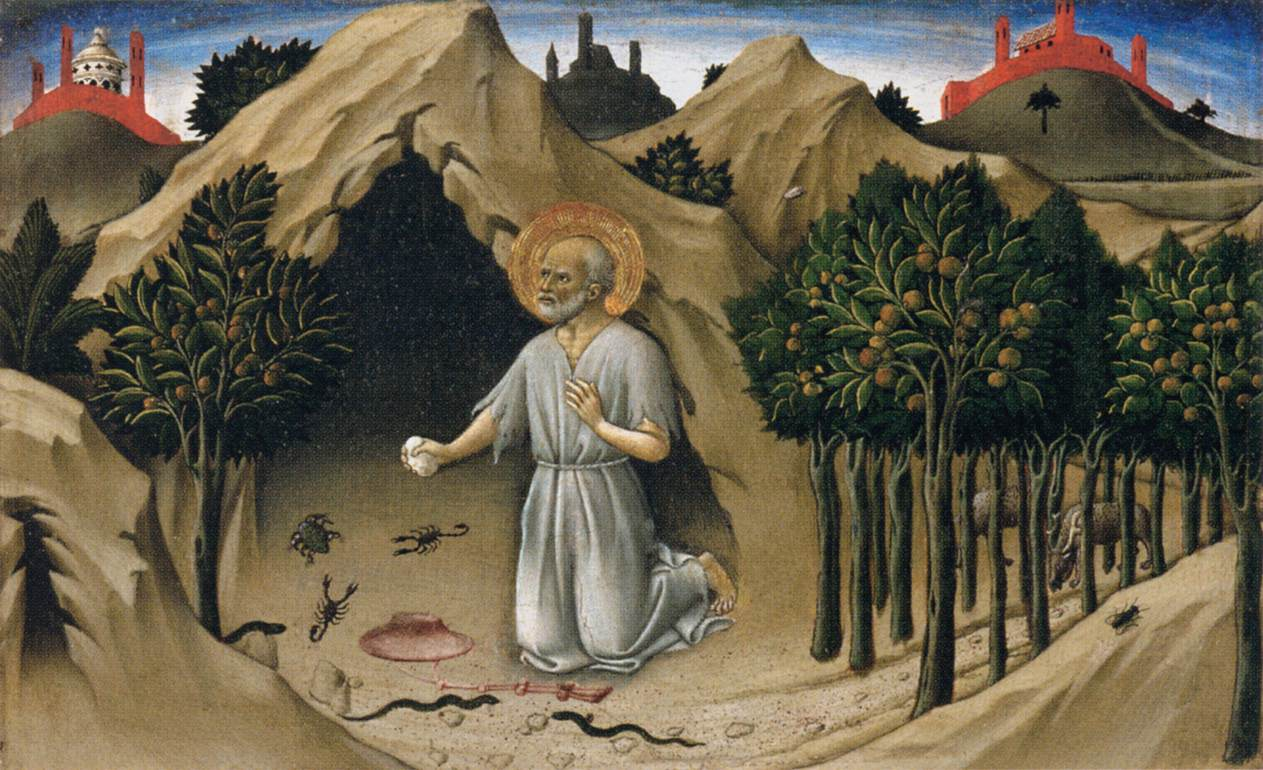
The Penitence of Saint Jerome

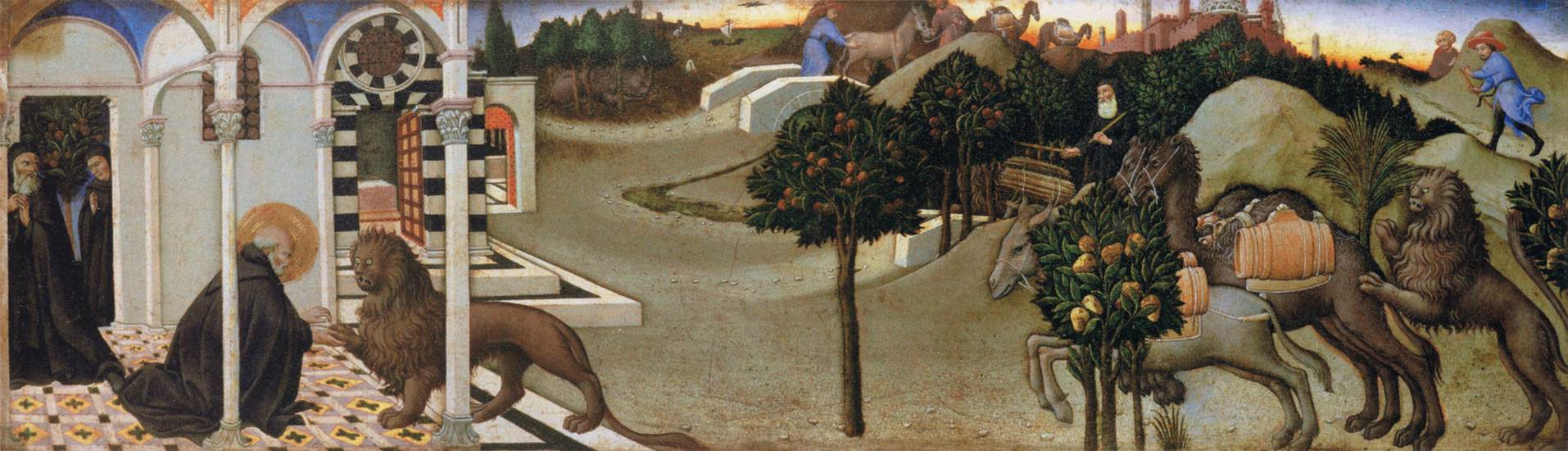
Saint Jerome Removes a Thorn from a Lion's Claw

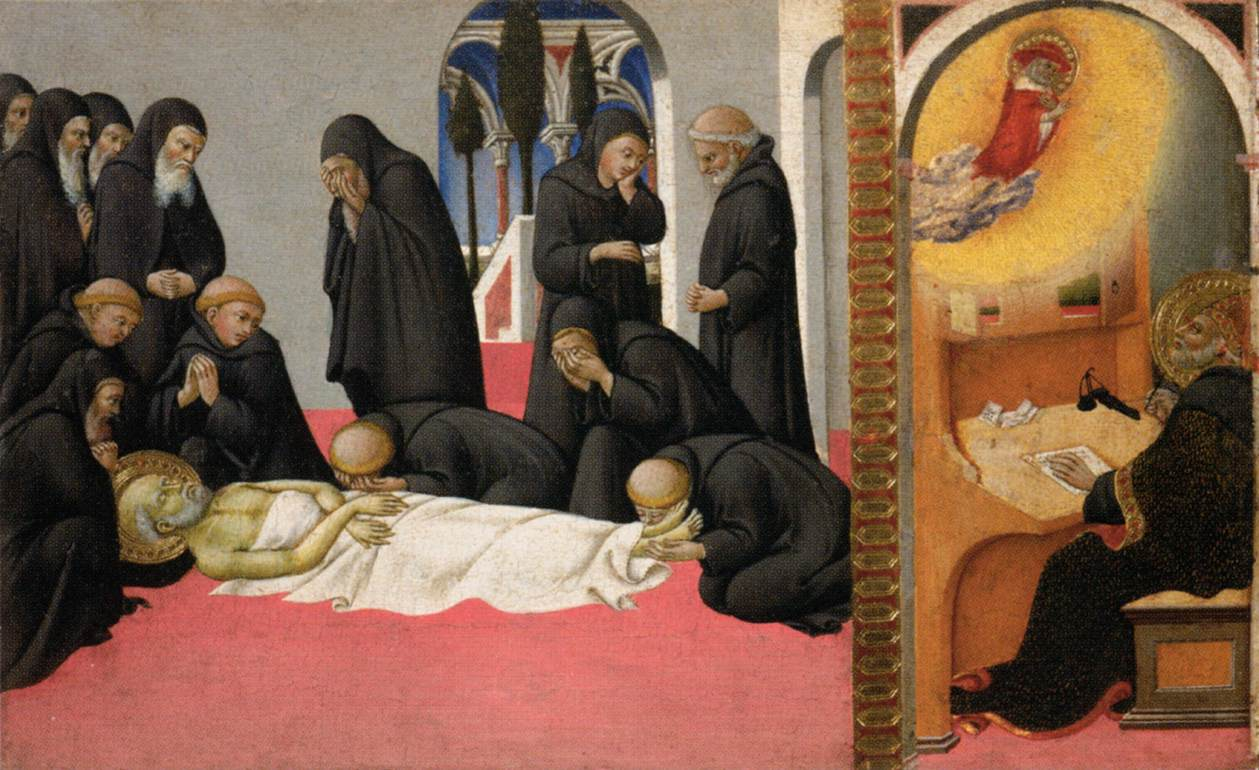
The Death of Saint Jerome in the Presence of his Disciples; he Appears to Saint Cyril of Jerusalem

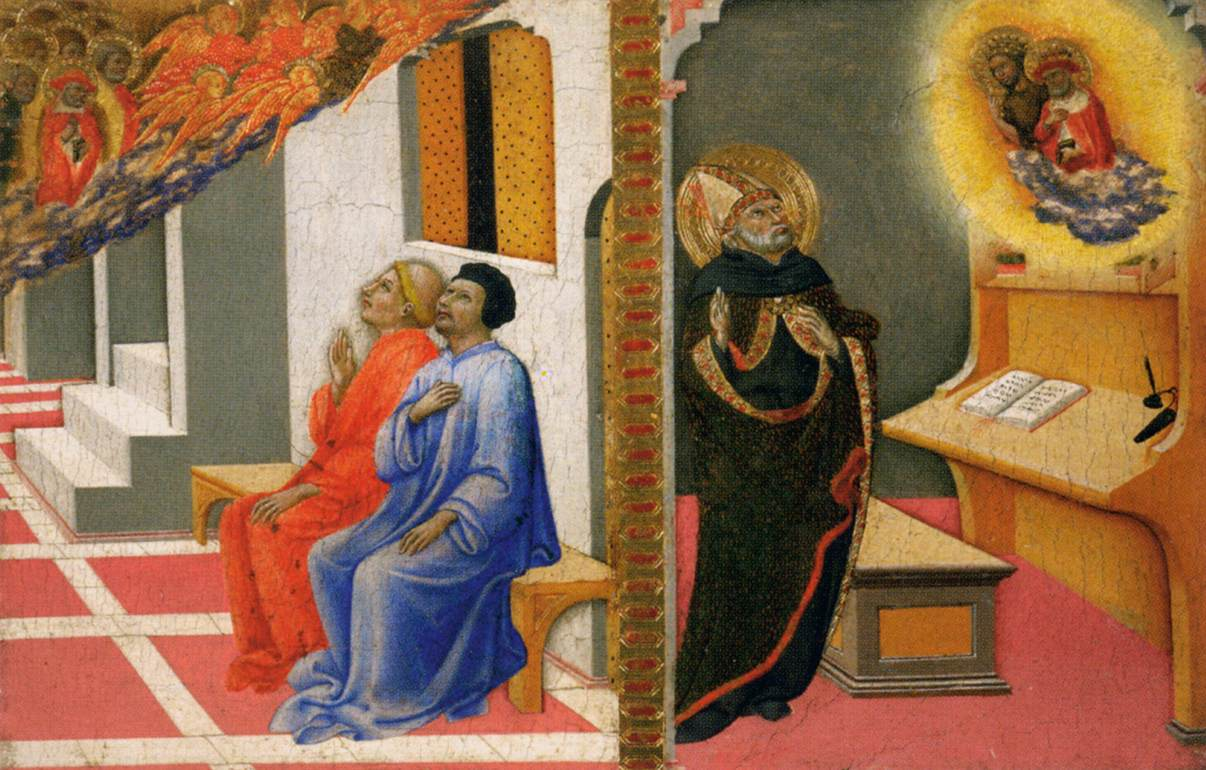
Saint Jerome Appears to Sulpicius Severus, then beside John the Baptist to Saint Augustine of Hippo
