= Statue of Jupiter (Hermitage) =

Colossal Roman statue at Hermitage depicting Jupiter

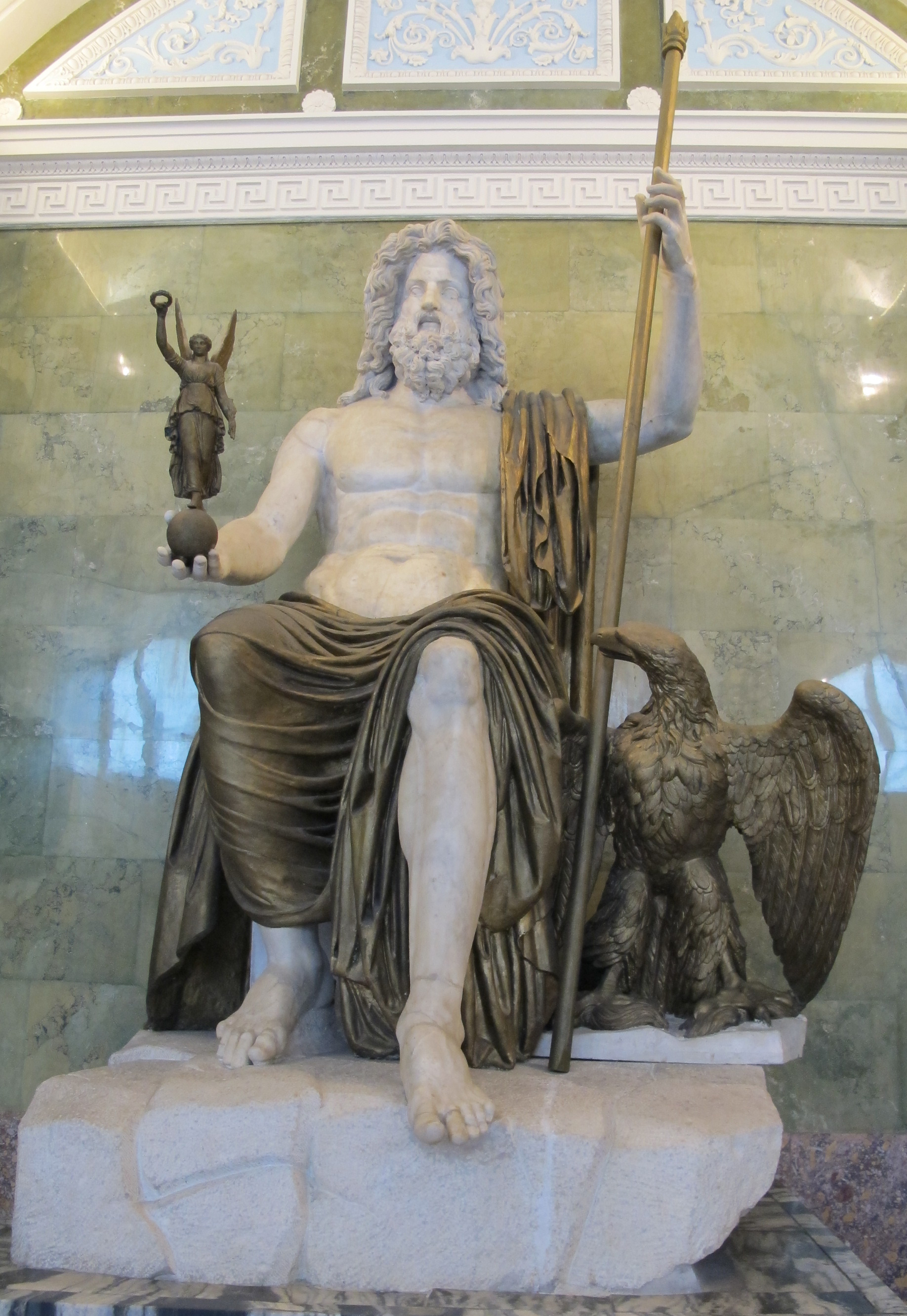
- Year: 1st century AD.
- Medium: Marble and bronzed plaster
- Dimensions: 347 cm (137 in)
- Weight: 16,000 kg
- Location: Hermitage Museum, Saint Petersburg

The Statue of Jupiter is a colossal Roman statue located in the Hermitage Museum in Saint Petersburg, depicting the supreme ancient Roman god Jupiter, created by an unknown Roman master at the end of the 1st century AD. The sculpture is one of the most famous exhibits of the museum. The statue of Jupiter is also a significant monument of the Flavian era, bearing the characteristic features of Roman art of this period.

The prototype of this statue was created by Phidias in the 5th century BC, the statue of Zeus at Olympia, now lost, famous as one of the Seven Wonders of the World. It was made for the Temple of Zeus and depicted the supreme ancient Greek god Zeus—the central religious building of the ancient Olympic Games.

The Roman statue was found at the end of the 19th century in the Villa of Domitian near Rome, and was in the collection of the Marquis Giampietro Campana. After the ruin of the Marquis, the sculpture was bought by Emperor Alexander II and delivered to the Hermitage in 1861.
