= Sano di Pietro =

Italian painter (1405–1481)

Sano di Pietro or Ansano di Pietro di Mencio (1405–1481) was an Italian painter of the Sienese school of painting. He was active for about half a century during the Quattrocento period and his contemporaries included Giovanni di Paolo and Sassetta.

== Life ==
Sano was born in 1405. His name entered the roll of painters in 1428 where it remained until his death in 1481. In addition to his own painting and overseeing the pupils and assistants in his workshop, Sano was part of the civic fabric of Siena; in 1431 and 1442 he was the leader of the San Donato district of Siena. Sano was also employed as an arbitrator; in 1475 he was called upon to settle a dispute between fellow painters Neroccio di Bartolommeo and Francesco di Giorgio Martini.

However, he made a living as a painter. The workshop he ran produced a large number of artworks. He wasn't merely a painter of altarpieces. He also produced frescoes, miniatures, and book bindings. Sano died in 1481. His death notice read:

Pictor famosus et homo totus deditus Deo
A famous painter and a man wholly dedicated to God

== The Sienese School ==
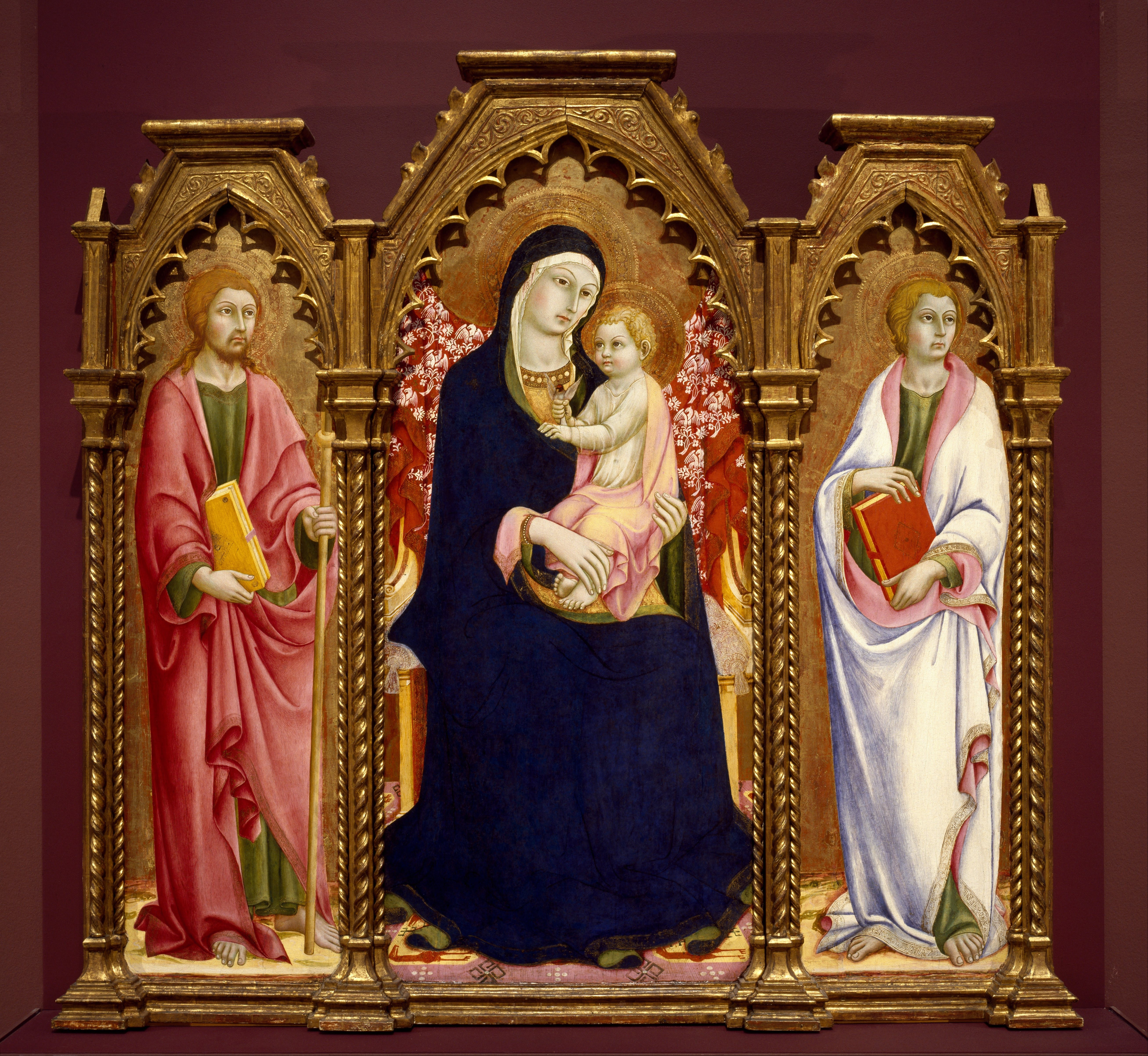
Triptych of Madonna with Child, St. James and St. John the Evangelist. Brooklyn Museum of Art.

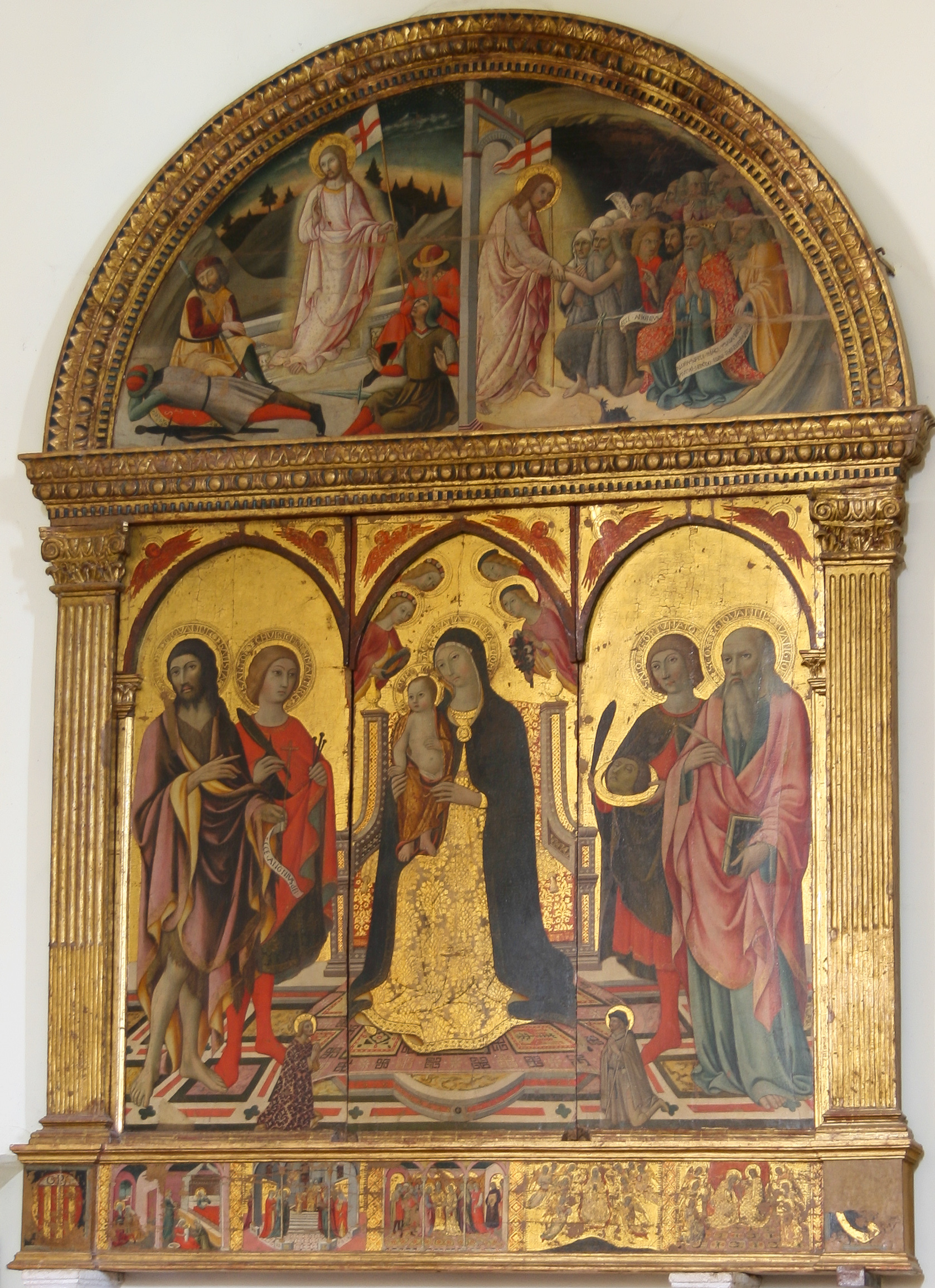
Polittico in San Quirico d'Orcia's collegiata

In the century before Sano's birth the Sienese school of painting had risen as a rival to that of the Florentines. The styles of the two schools were markedly different. Florence was said to be the more realistic of the two while Siena was said to be more fanciful. In fact the inscription above the Camopilla Gate leading into the city says;

Cor magis tibi Siena Pandit
Siena opens her heart still wider to thee

Sienese painting was said to personify dreams. This can be seen in the hallmarks of the style of the Sienese School. Above all, the Sienese painters were known for their vibrant colors. They routinely used hues never seen in paintings before and rarely seen outside the city. They employed a richness of detail that can be quite unsettling for the first time viewer. The draperies of the clothing are elegant and numerous, but it is the patterns of the fabrics and the details on the necklines that can leave the viewer breathless. The paintings are at once sumptuous yet ethereal. This lightness of being displayed in the figures and even the landscapes themselves is the final hallmark of a painting from the Sienese School.

== Reputation as a painter ==
In the 15th century in Siena, as elsewhere in Italy and Europe, he had his own workshop. In his workshop, he oversaw assistants and pupils that helped him finish the commissions he had received. Over 270 of Sano's works survived. It is one of the paradoxes about di Pietro that because he was so successful he is often overlooked. Many of his critics say that too many of his paintings resemble each other. However, he produced what the customer asked for, not what he might paint for himself. Many of these works were not produced by Sano alone. In his A History of Sienese Painting George Edgall writes:

"It should be pointed out, however, that the monotony
which one feels in looking at paintings labelled Sano
di Pietro is due to the workshop assistants."

In his book, Sienese Quatrocento Painting, John Pope-Hennessey furthers the argument for the quality of Sano's own paintings. He says that when the viewer looks at a painting that has been attributed solely to di Pietro one can see his sensitivity and style.

Sano was known for his use and mastery of color.

One example of this is a polyptych made for the Church of the Gesuati. This painting is the first piece that can be attributed solely to him. The central figure of Mary is clad in a blue robe whose folds seem to shimmer with intensity. This intensity radiates out through the figures on either side of her.

The second painting is "St. Bernardino Preaching in the Campo of Siena." In 1425, St. Bernardino gave seven sermons a day for seven weeks in the town square (campo) of Siena. Sano commemorated this event in his painting. The painting depicts a vast crowd at the center of town. The crowd is so large it seems to fall off the edge of the painting itself. The red of the clothing of St. Bernardino's audience seems to draw itself towards the pink of the building. Instead of clashing, these two colors complement each other. The warm colors are balanced by the blues in the sky and the canopy, both of which bisect the painting.

== Collections ==
Sano di Pietro's paintings are housed in several institutions, including the National Gallery and the Cathedral Museum of Siena, the Pinacoteca Vaticana, the Brooklyn Museum of Art, the Lindenau-Museum of Altenburg, the Diocesan Museum of Pienza, the Clark Art Institute, the Museum of Fine Arts, Houston, the Museum of Fine Arts, Boston, the Detroit Institute of Arts, the Museum of Fine Arts, Budapest, the Birmingham Museum of Art, the Speed Art Museum, the Philadelphia Museum of Art, the Yale University Art Gallery, the Fitzwilliam Museum, the Musée des Beaux-Arts de Quimper, and the Pushkin State Museum of Fine Arts.

== Selected works ==
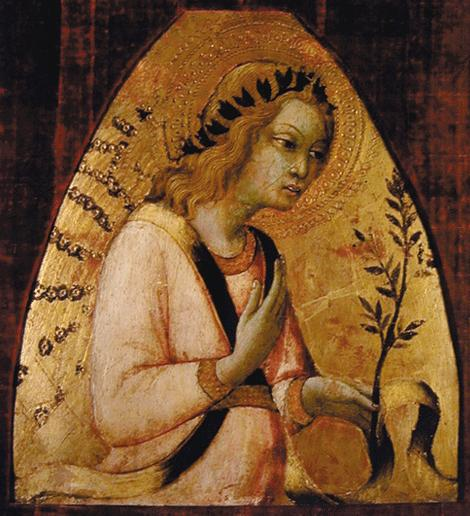
The Angel of the Annunciation

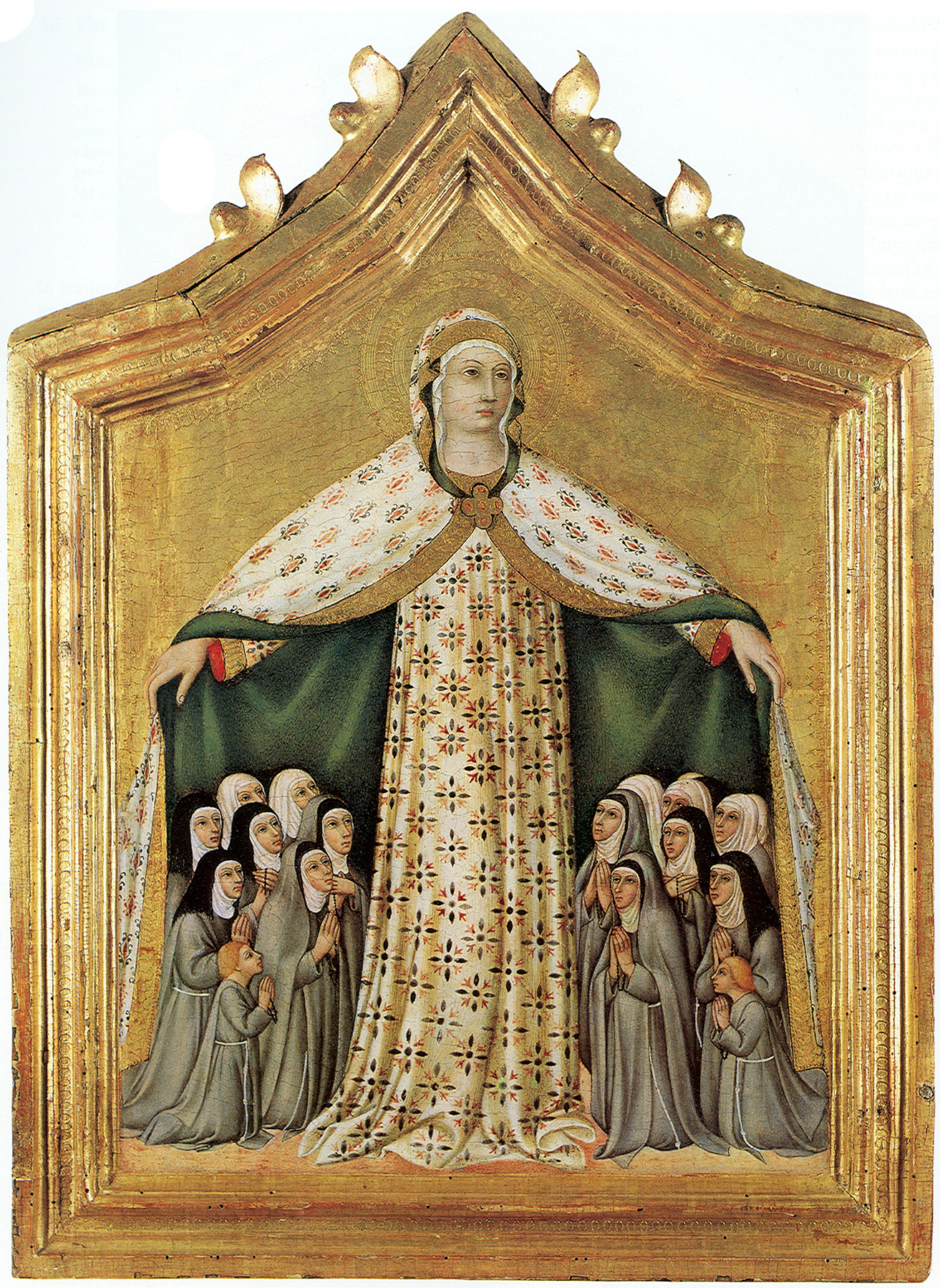
Madonna of Mercy

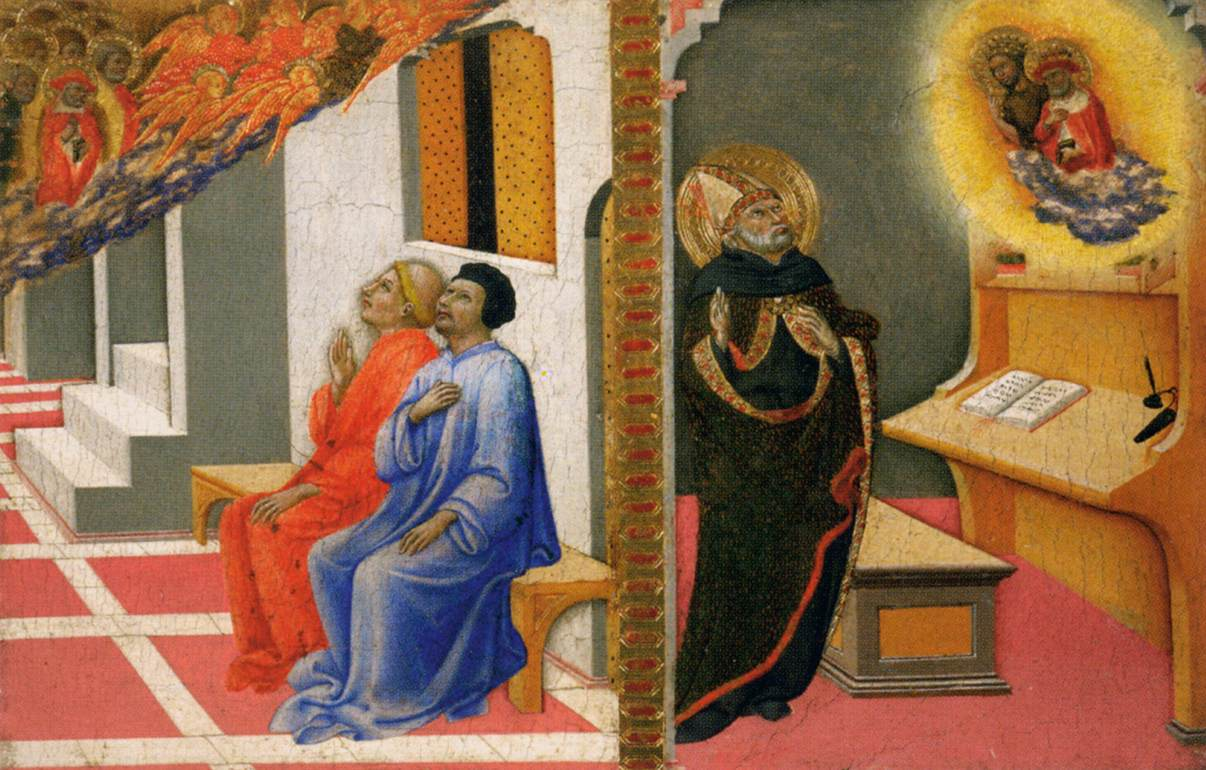
Scenes from the Life of St Jerome

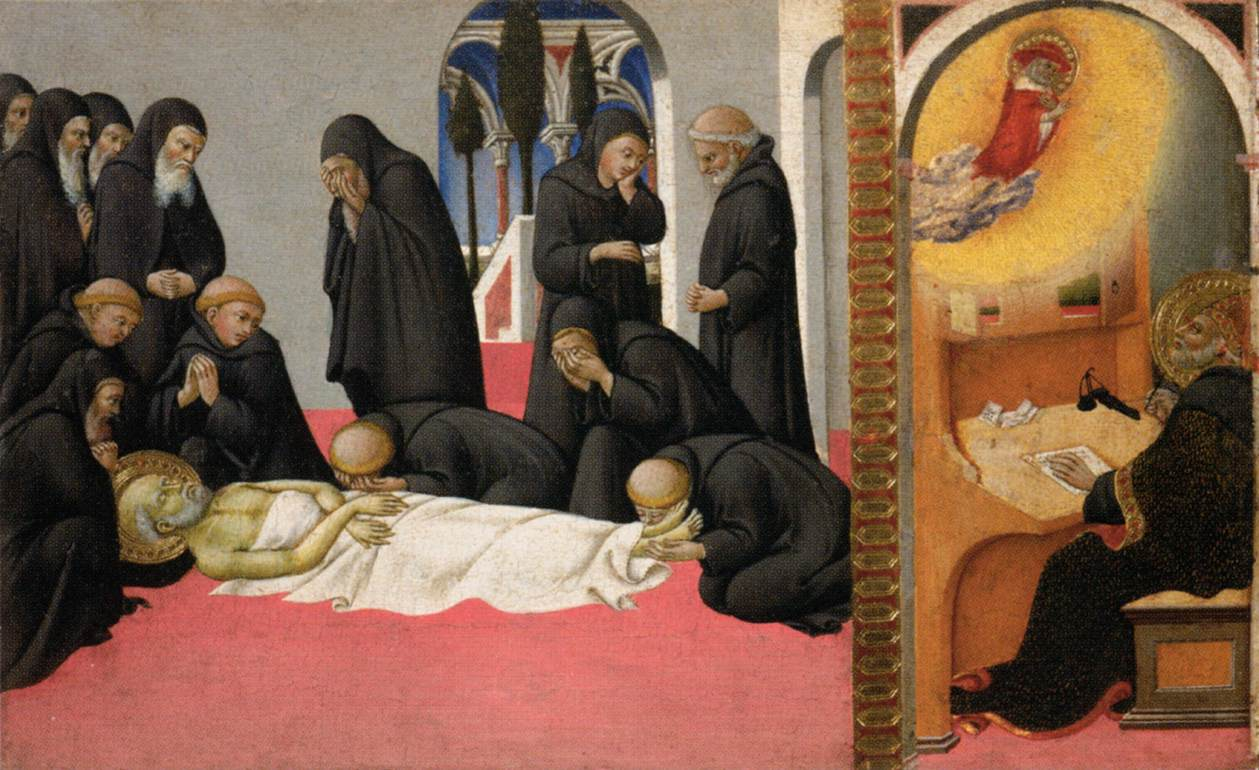
Scenes from the Life of St Jerome

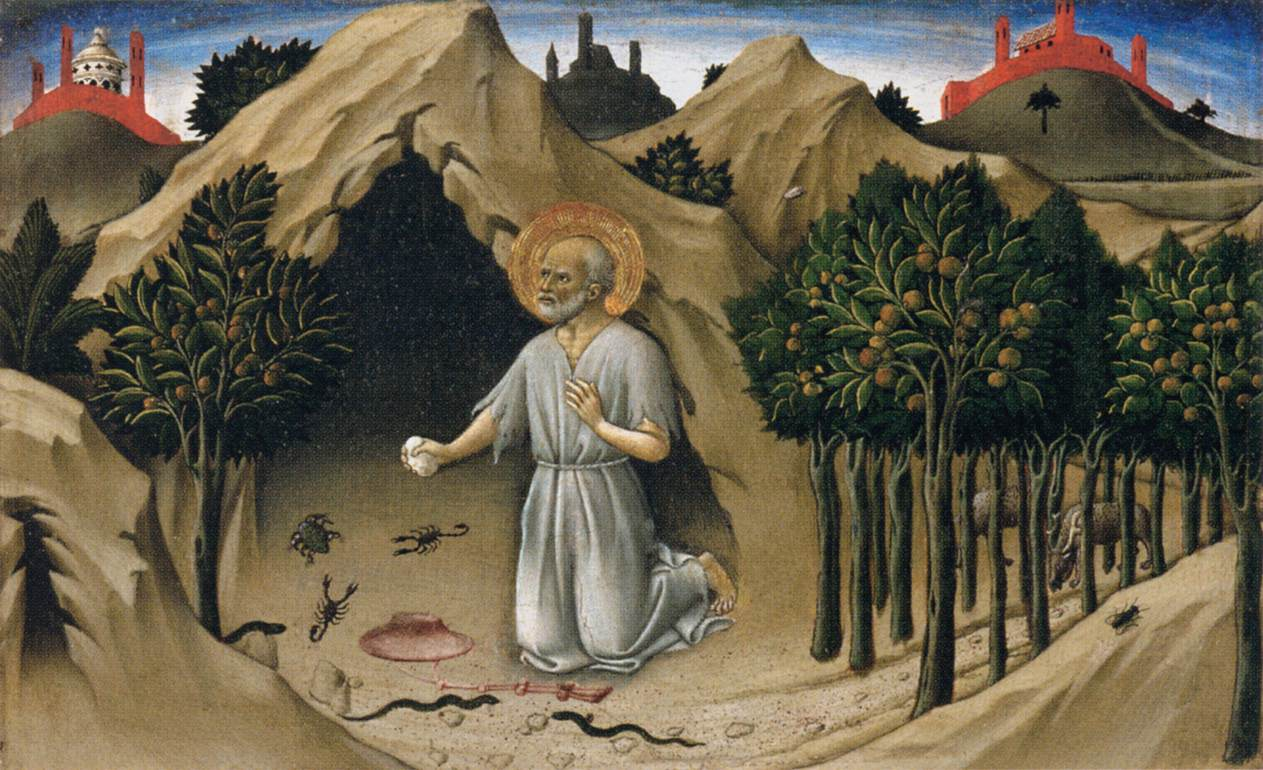
Scenes from the Life of St Jerome

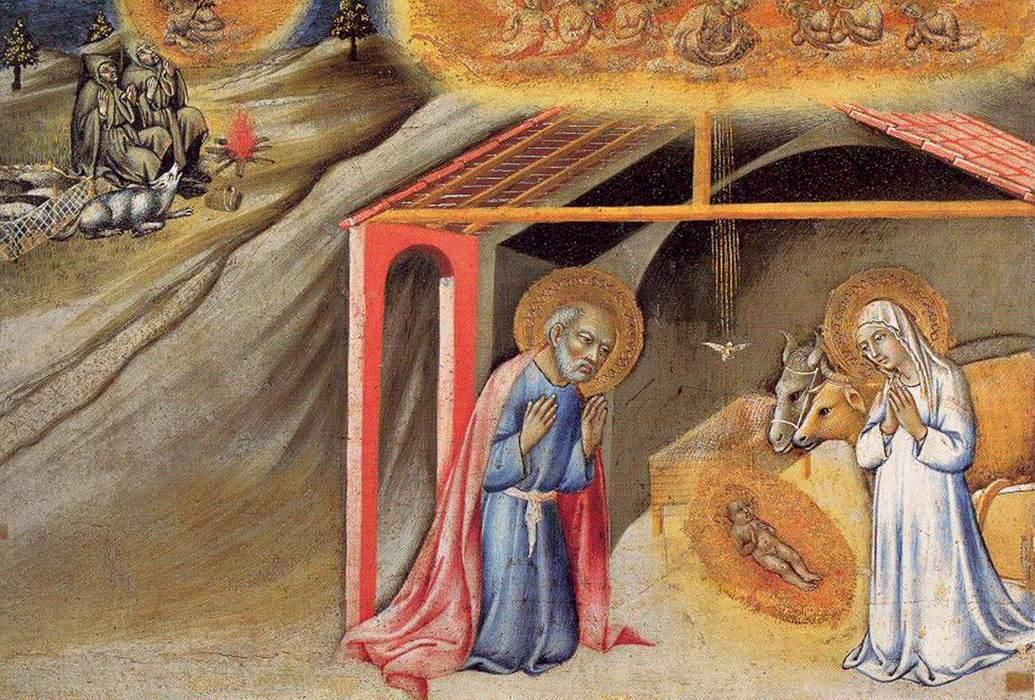
Nativity (c. 1445) - Panel Pinacoteca, Vatican

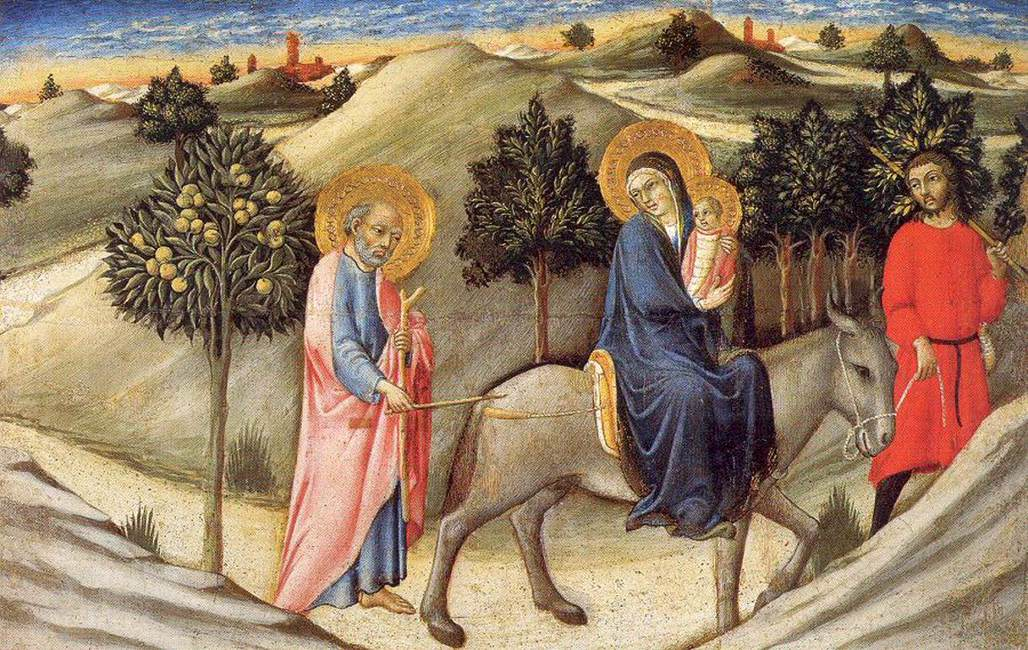
Flight to Egypt (c. 1445) - Panel Pinacoteca, Vatican
- Gesuati Altarpiece - Pinacoteca Nazionale di Siena (with six predella panels in the Louvre)
- Christ Carrying Cross, Philadelphia Museum of Art, Philadelphia
- St Jerome (c. 1470) - Tempera on panel 95 x 51 cm. Museum of Fine Arts, Boston
- Madonna and Child - Tempera on wood, Detroit Institute of Art, Detroit
- Madonna and Christ Child with Saints - Tempera on wood, Lowe Art Museum, Coral Gables, Florida
- Virgin and Christ Child with Saints Jerome and Bernardino of Siena, Museum of Fine Arts, Houston, Texas
- Madonna and Christ Child with Saints, Denver Art Museum, Denver, Colorado

=== Predella of an altarpiece in five parts ===
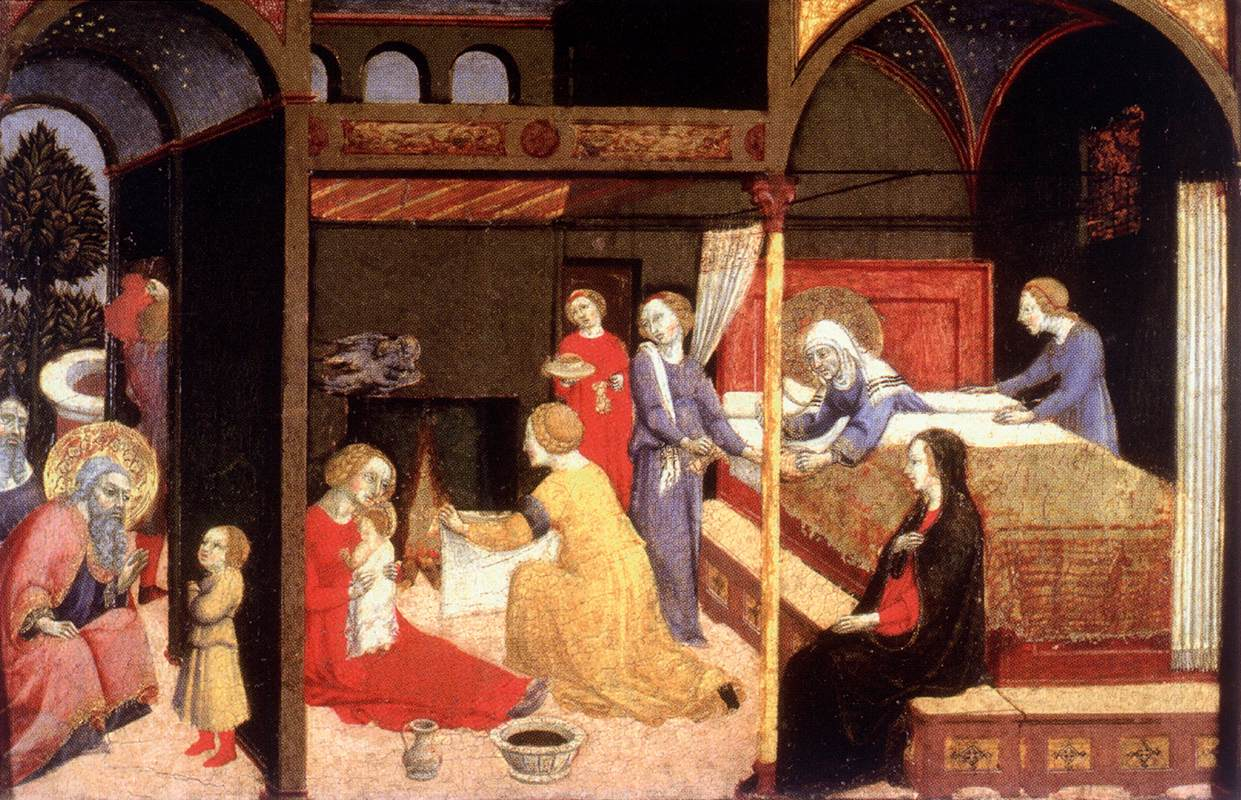
Birth of the Virgin (1448–52) - Tempera on wood, University of Michigan Museum of Art, Ann Arbor

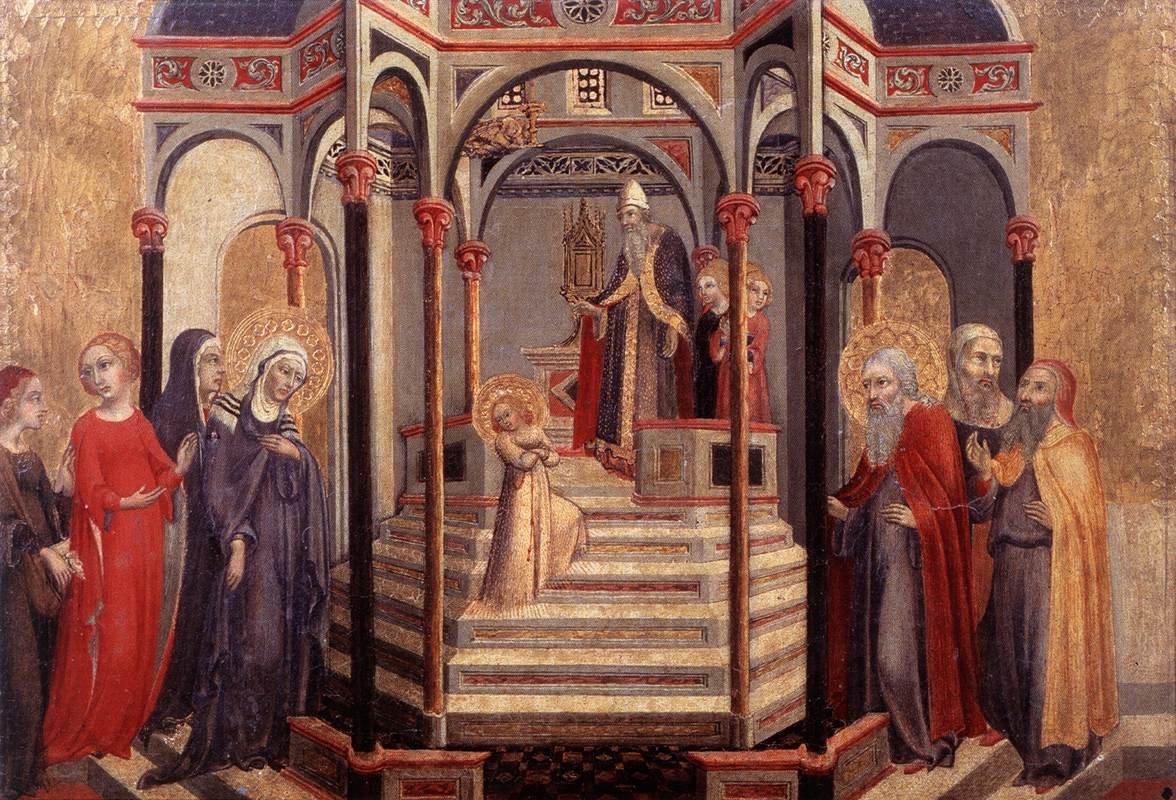
Presentation of the Virgin at the Temple (1448–52) - Tempera on wood, 32 x 46 cm. Pinacoteca, Vatican

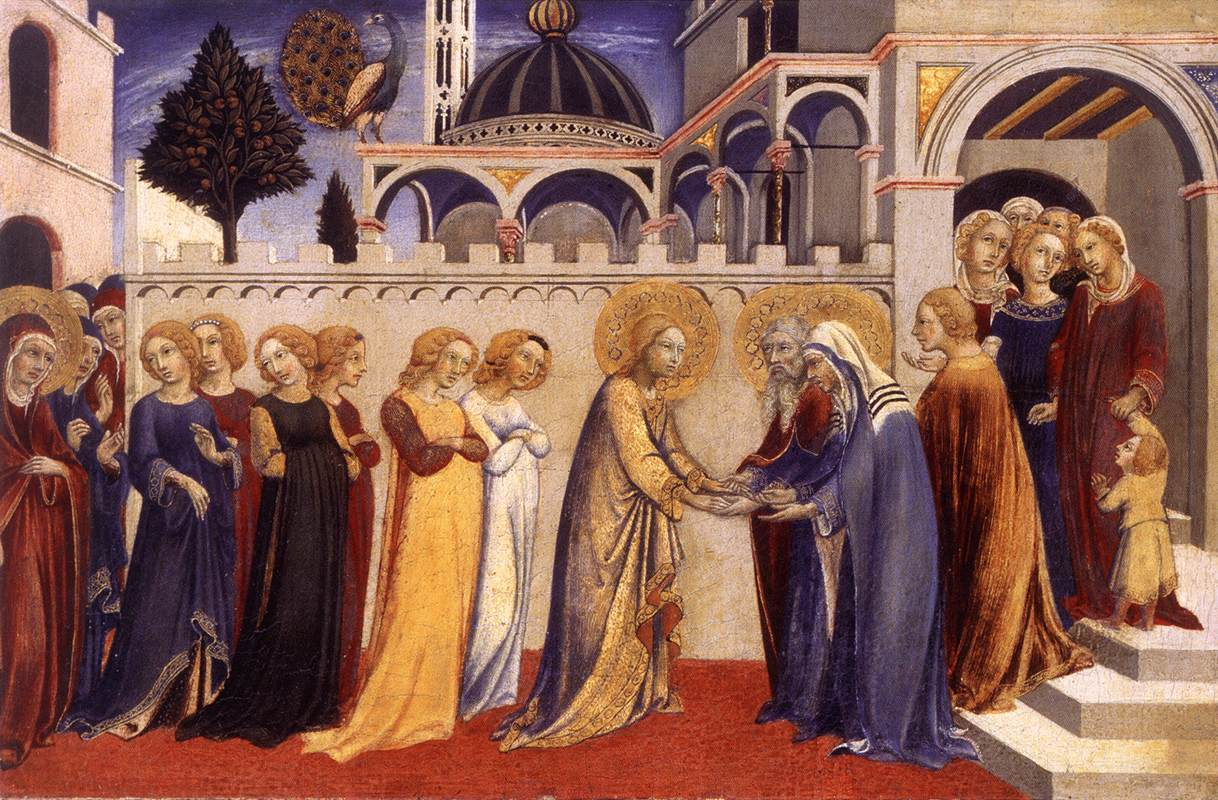
Return of the Virgin (1448–52) - Tempera on wood, 30 x 46 cm. Lindenau-Museum, Altenburg

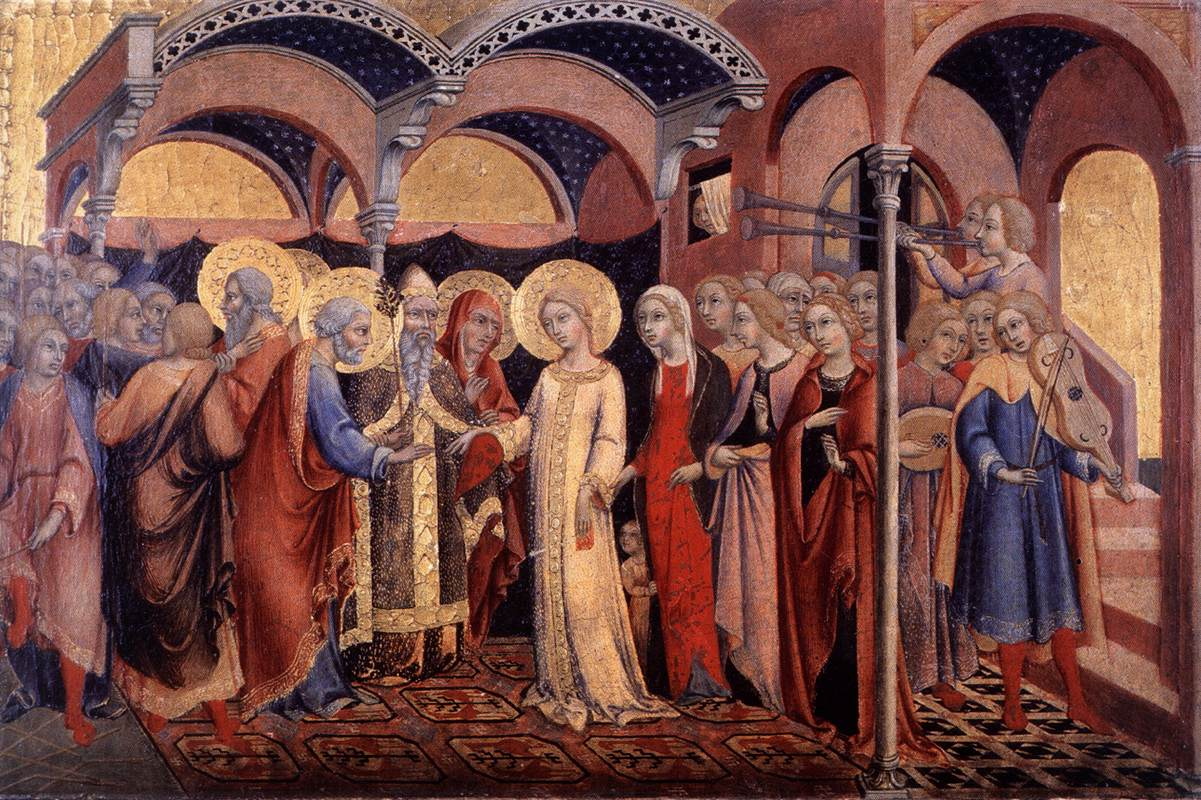
Marriage of the Virgin (1448–52) - Tempera on wood, 32 x 46 cm. Pinacoteca, Vatican

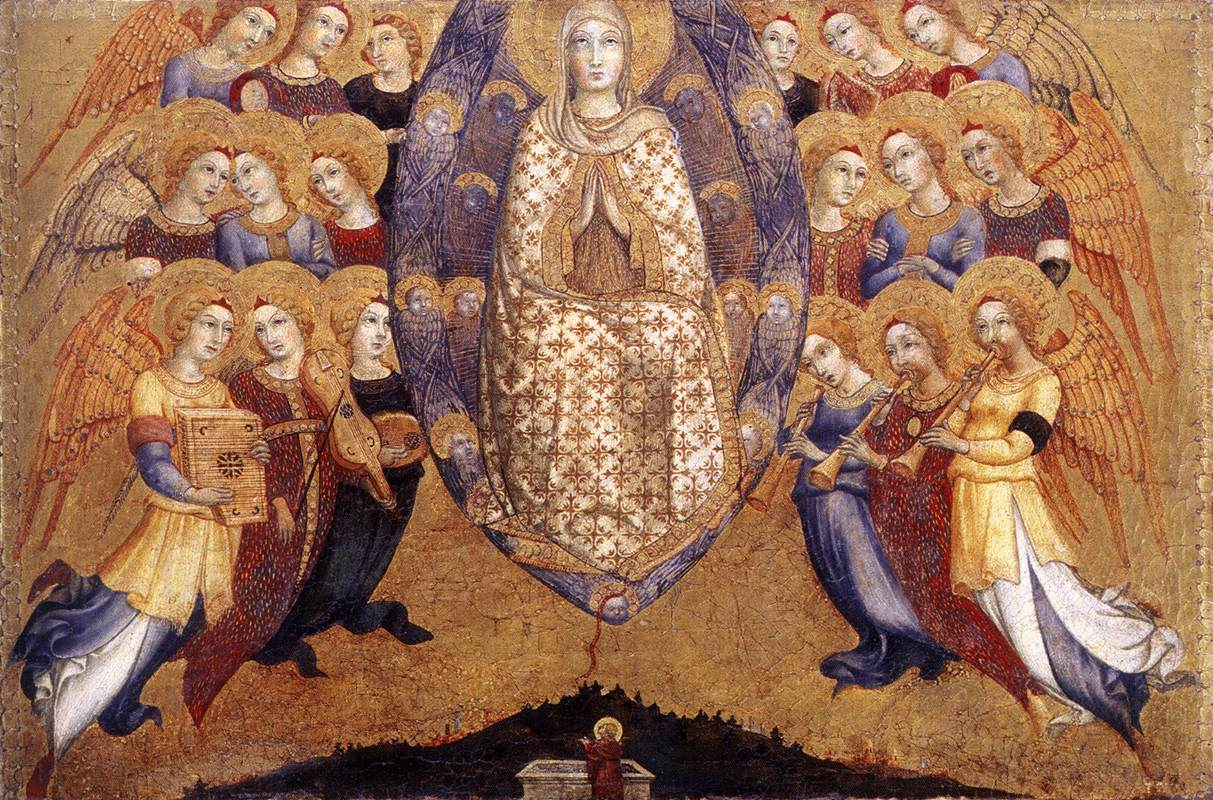
Assumption of the Virgin (1448–52) - Tempera on wood, 32 x 47 cm. Lindenau-Museum, Altenburg

== See also ==
- Domenico di Bartolo
- Master of the Osservanza
- Sassetta
- Sienese School
- Saint Agatha (Sano di Pietro)

== Sources ==
- Bernard Berenson, Essays in the Study of Sienese Painting (New York, F.F. Sherman, 1918).
- J. A. Crowe and G. B. Calvalcaselle, A History of Painting in Italy; Umbria, Florence and Siena from the Second to the Sixteenth Century (London, J. Murray, 1903).
- Timothy Hyman, Sienese Painting (New York, Thames and Hudson, 2003).
- Robert Oertel, Early Italian Painting to 1400 (New York, Frederick A. Praeger, 1968).
