= Giampietro Campana =

Italian art collector

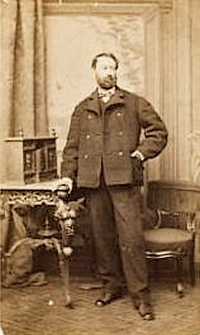
'Carte de visite' of Giampietro Campana

Giampietro Campana (1808 – 10 October 1880), created marchese di Cavelli (1849), was an Italian art collector who assembled one of the nineteenth century's greatest collection of Greek and Roman sculpture and antiquities. The part of his collection of Hellenistic and Roman gold jewellery conserved in the Musée du Louvre warranted an exhibition devoted to it in 2005–06. (Note: Trésors antiques: bijoux de la collection Campana (Paris, Musée du Louvre, 21 October 2005—16 January 2006), curated by Françoise Gaultier and Catherine Metzger; the exhibition continued to Milan and the Capitoline Museums, Rome, where an Italian catalogue was published, Tesori antichi: i gioielli della collezione Campana. Much of the information in this article was derived from the catalogue's introduction.) He was an early collector of early Italian paintings, the so-called "primitives" of the fourteenth and fifteenth centuries, which were overlooked by his contemporaries. And like many collectors of his generation, he coveted Italian maiolica of the 15th and 16th centuries.

== Career ==
Campana was born in Rome into a sophisticated milieu: the family was also entrusted with the operation of the Monte di Pietà, a papal charitable trust that operated as pawnbroker to Rome; Giampietro entered as an assistant in 1831 and was so efficient he was appointed director general in 1833. In 1835 he was made a cavaliere of the Order of the Golden Spur by Pope Gregory XVI in gratitude for the loans that the reorganized Monte di Pietà had been able to make to the Vatican.

Campagna's first archaeological excavations were undertaken in 1829 at Frascati, where the family had the use of properties belonging to the Camera Apostolica.

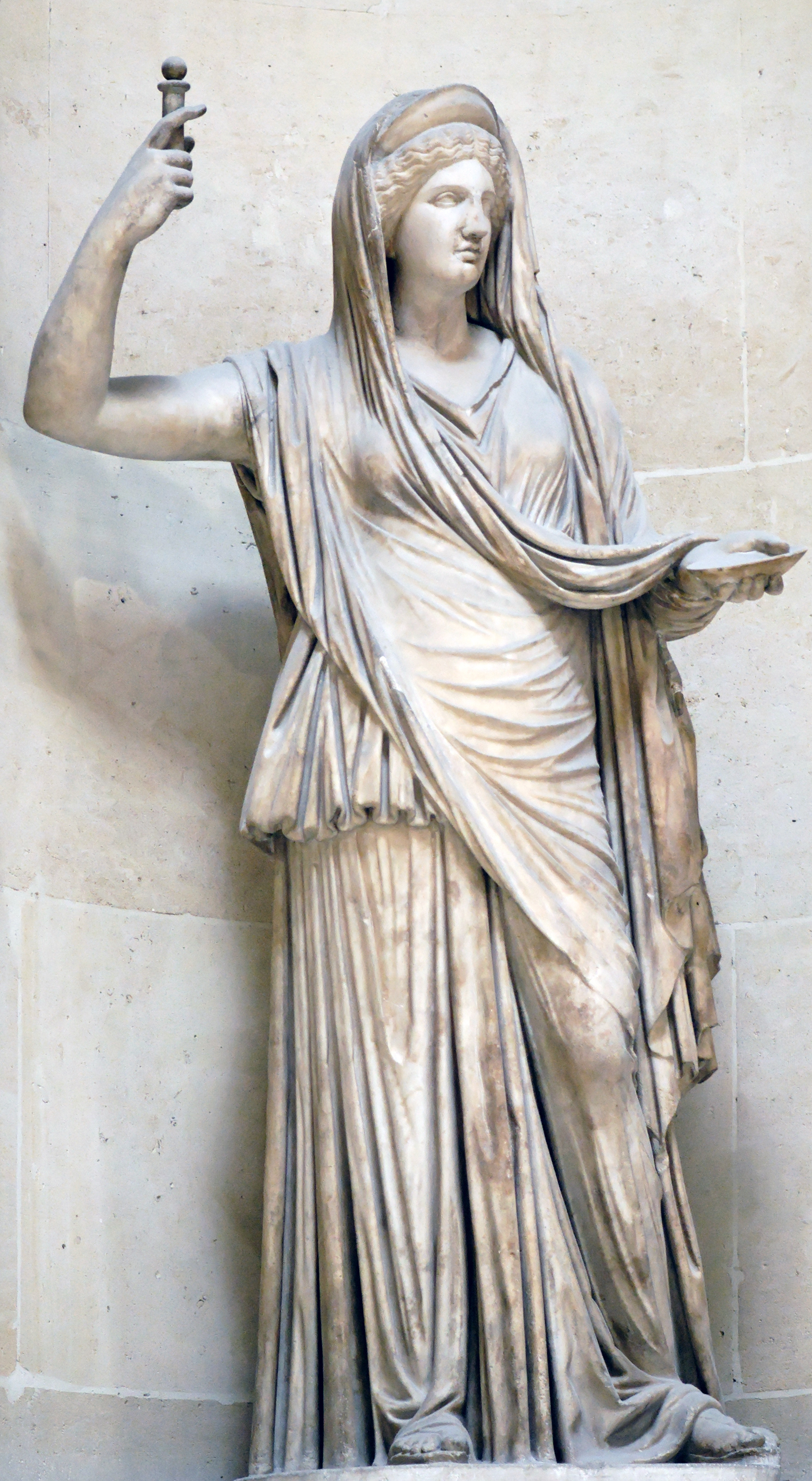
The Hera Campana, a Roman copy of a Hellenistic original, now in the Louvre Museum.

== Collection ==
Campana's collection ranged over bronzes and marble sculpture, the Roman architectural terracotta reliefs that are still called "Campana" reliefs, ceramics, numismatics and medals, acquired on the market and through excavations on his own properties and other sites and handsomely arranged and displayed at the Villa del Laterano. He also collected Italian paintings, forming a notable collection of the so-called "primitives" of the 14th and 15th centuries.

Thanks to his mature experience in the archaeological field— which in the mid-19th century was still a treasure hunt for works of art and curiosities, even in the hands of a sophisticated amateur— Campana was responsible for the discovery of the columbarium of Pomponius Hylas and two other columbarii near the tomb of the Scipios, of which he directed the publication, as well as publishing his own collection of the terracotta relief plaques of the Republican era that bear his name still. His obtained prominent positions with the pontifical administration and was placed in charge of the excavations at Ostia. From 1842 he published several editions of his collection of moulded terracotta tiles, under the title Antiche opere in plastica, in which he offered antiquarian essays on the mythological and iconographic representations on the moulded relief panels and tiles; this was the first work to draw attention to these neglected architectural elements, which had a long pre-Roman history in Etruscan civilization

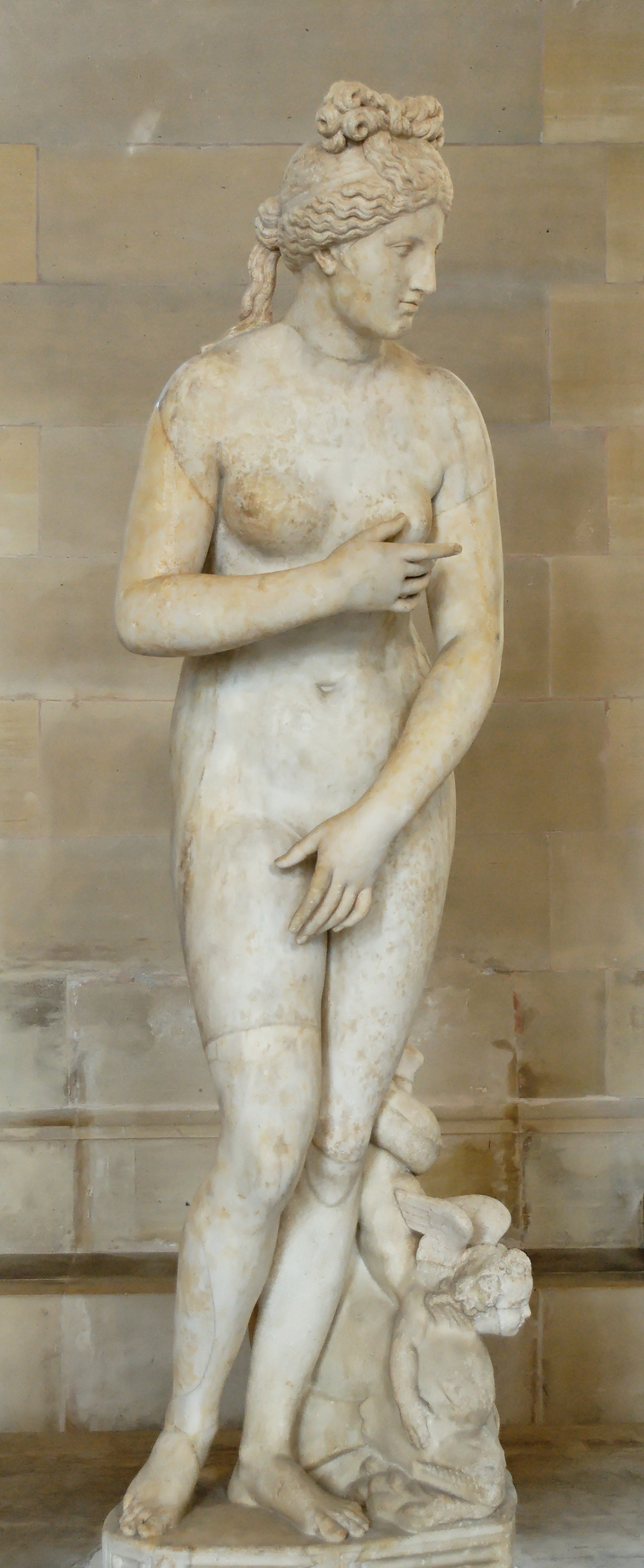
Campana's second-century AD version of the Capitoline Venus, discovered at Anzio, is also part of the Campana collection at the Louvre

In 1846 Pope Pius IX made a stately visit to inspect the collection at the Villa Campana, to which Campana had removed his Roman sculptures. The villa of his grandfather at the brow and gently rolling upper slopes of the Caelian Hill, formerly a retreat of Paolo della Croce, was entered through wrought iron gates in via di San Stefano di Rotondo just off piazza di S. Giovanni in Laterano; (Note: The villa was located at the junction between the via di San Giovani and via dei Santi Quattro Coronati (41.8874°N 12.5026°E). The building now occupying the site was built in 1890.) it had been beautified (Note: A guidebook of 1854 still found it "la petite villa Campani ornée de quelques sculptures d'un médiocre intérêt", "the little villa Campani, decorated with sculptures of mediocre interest"; to Edmond Lafond's French eye it was a "chef-d'oeuvre de mauvais goût", a "masterpiece of bad taste".) and its long range extended in a classicising manner that seemed to one lady visitor "a temple of old Rome, with well-proportioned columns and pediment". (Note: A description of the villa as it was shortly after his death was published by Mary Eliza Haweis.) Its curving drive was shaded with some of the first Eucalyptus in Rome, and in the garden, along with exotic plants, fountains and grottoes, Giampietro Campana recreated an Etruscan tomb. The site had some genuinely antique precedents, remains of the domus of Plautius Lateranus (Note: Confiscated under Nero, it became the nucleus of the Lateran Palace.) traversed by remains of the Claudian aqueduct; a frescoed triclinium excavated on the site in the time of Campana's father was memorialised in engravings. Annexed to the villa was the tiny ancient Church of Santa Maria Imperatrice. (Note: The structure was largely rebuilt by Campana. It was demolished in the 1880s to make way for housing, according to Mariano Armellini, Le chiese di Roma dal secolo IV al XIX (Rome:Tipografia Vaticana) 1891 (on-line text at LacusCurtius.com); its icon of the Virgin was transferred in 1926 to the chapel of the hospital of San Giovanni in Laterano. (Roma per noi: il Celio p.26) The two sections of the extensive grounds were connected by a private tunnel beneath via Santi Quattro Coronati.

== Culmination ==
In 1851 Campana married the Englishwoman Emily Rowles, (Note: Her seated portrait sculpture, in Carrara marble, by Pietro Tenerani was included in the exhibition Frascati al tempo di Pio IX e del Marchese Campana, 2006) whose family had connections to Prince Louis Napoleon, soon Napoleon III. Because of his cultural merits, he was given the title of marchese di Cavelli by Ferdinand II of Naples. He was an advisor to the Grand-Duke of Saxe-Weimar In 1851, the Natale di Roma, the annual celebration on the traditional day of Rome's founding, celebrated by the Pontificia Accademia Romana di Archeologia was held at the Villa Campana on the Caelian Hill, near the Basilica of St. John Lateran; among the guests was Ludwig of Bavaria. In addition to this villa suburbana, Campana had his principal Roman residence, the Palazzo Campana, at the corner of via Babuino and Piazza del Popolo; there, according to Blewett's Handbook for travellers in central Italy (London, 1856), "the Campana Museum is in many respects superior to the Museo Gregoriano at the Vatican", though the collection was open only one day a week and only to those bearing a letter of introduction. The "Campana" reliefs were more easily viewed, as they were at the Monte di Pietà. Blewett's description of the collection at Palazzo Campana is worth quoting:

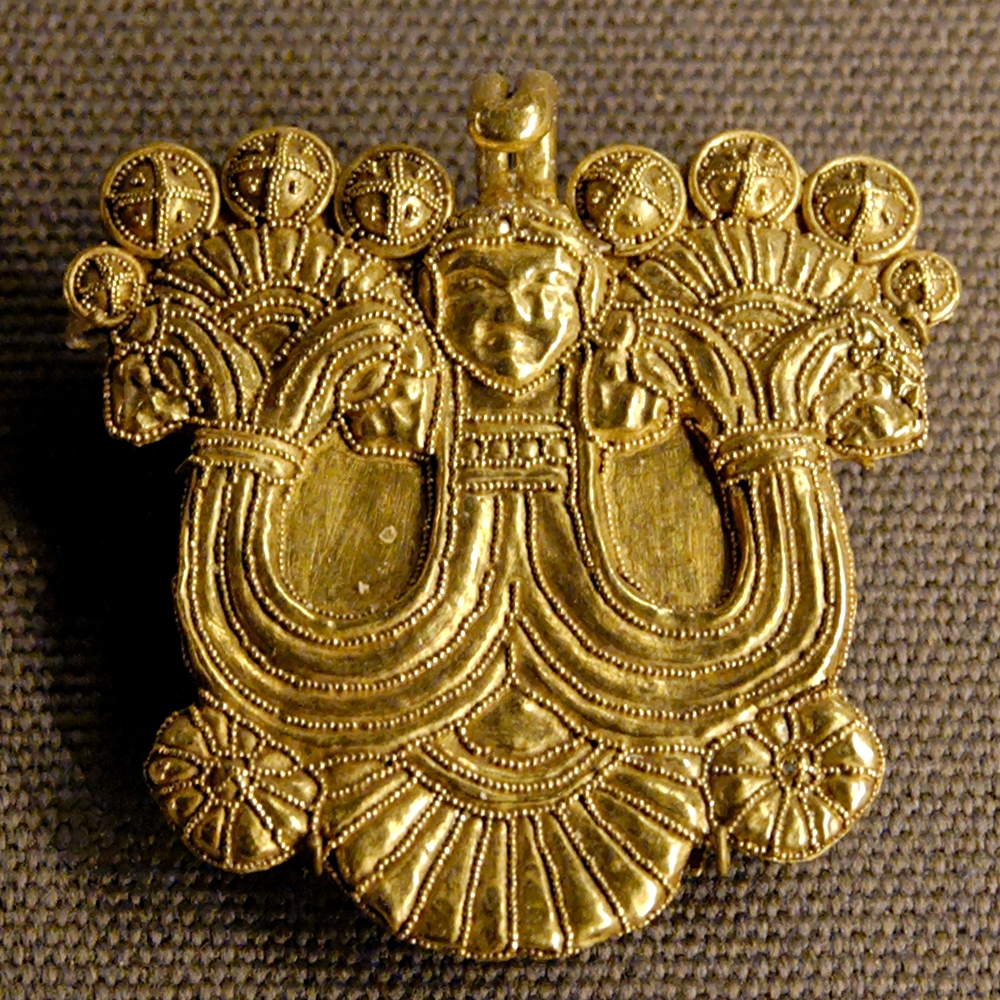
Gold fibula, Magna Graecia, ca 630 BCE, from the Campana collection at the Louvre

The specimens consist for the most part of gold ornaments, earrings in the form of genii, necklaces of scarabæi, filigree brooches, bracelets, neckchains, torques, chapelets in form of foliage &c.; the head of the horned Bacchus, and a gold fibula with an Etruscan inscription, equal, if they do not surpass, the finest productions of Trichinopoly or Genoa. One of the most remarkable objects in this collection is a superb Scarabæus (Note: An engraved gem in the shape of a scarab beetle.) in sardonyx, representing Cadmus destroying the Dragon. The collection of Etruscan vases (Note: Greek vases found in Etruscan burials were at first considered to be Etruscan.) is also very fine, several presenting historical scenes, with Greek and Etruscan inscriptions. The Cabinet of Bronzes comprises a fine series of Etruscan and Roman objects: 2 beautiful tripods, a mirror of extraordinary beauty and size, and a cinerary urn of most rare occurrence in metal; it was found near Perugia, containing the ashes of the dead, with a golden necklace, now amongst the jewellery; a bier of bronze, with the bottom in latticework, like that in the Museo Gregoriano, with the helmet, breastplate, greaves and sword of the warrior whose body reposed upon it. There are several fine specimens of Etruscan helmets, with delicate wreaths of gold foliage placed upon them. The collection of glass and enamels is most interesting, consisting of elegant tazze of blue, white and yellow glass mounted on filigree stands precisely as they were taken from the tombs. The series of Etruscan vases, not only from Etruria proper, but from Magna Grecia, is rich and extensive.

In around 1858 Campana published a catalogue of his collection which he divided into twelve sections: Vases (I), Bronzes (II), Jewellery and coins (III), Terracottas (IV), Glass (V), Etruscan, Greek and Roman paintings (VI), Greek and Roman sculpture (VII), Italian paintings from the Byzantine period to Raphael (VIII), Italian paintings from 1500 to ca 1700 (IX), Italian Maiolica of the 15th-16th centuries (X), Maiolica by Luca della Robbia and his contemporaries (XI), and Etruscan and Roman curiosities (XII). In 2001 Susanna Sarti published an attempt to trace the current location of the listed items.

== Disgrace ==
In a stunning reversal of his private fortunes, (Note: A report on the finances of the Monte di Pietà made by Vincenzo Pericoli in 1847 had already uncovered some troubling irregularities.) he pawned his antique jewels, and successively other parts of the collection. Works were interrupted at Vignola's grand villa at Frascati, which was being readied to receive the Campana collections, but he couldn't resist purchasing twenty-two classicising fresco elements painted by Baldassare Peruzzi for the Villa Stati-Mattei, as late as 1856. He was accused, arrested in November 1857 and convicted of embezzlement from the public funds in his care. After a dramatic trial he was condemned to twenty years prison which was commuted to exile and disgrace.

== Dispersal ==
His collection was sequestered by the Pontifical State. A catalogue of his collection was published in 1858 and it was put up for sale. Works from the Campana collection wound up in the great national museums, from the State Hermitage in St. Petersburg, where the Tsar's curator, Stepan Gedeonov was offered the right to select items from the collection before auction, to the Victoria and Albert Museum in London and the Metropolitan Museum of Art in New York.

The Russian purchases included the Venus Genetrix, the Jupiter Fidiacus from Domitian's villa near Lake Albano, and the bust said to be of Caius Marius, a gift to Campana from Pius VI; some 500 Greek vases, including the hydria from Magna Graecia hailed as Regina Vasorum, the "Queen of Vases," and 200 small bronzes are also at the State Hermitage Museum. The transformation of the Tsar's antiquities wrought by the acquisition of the Campana collection is noted by the State Hermitage Museum.

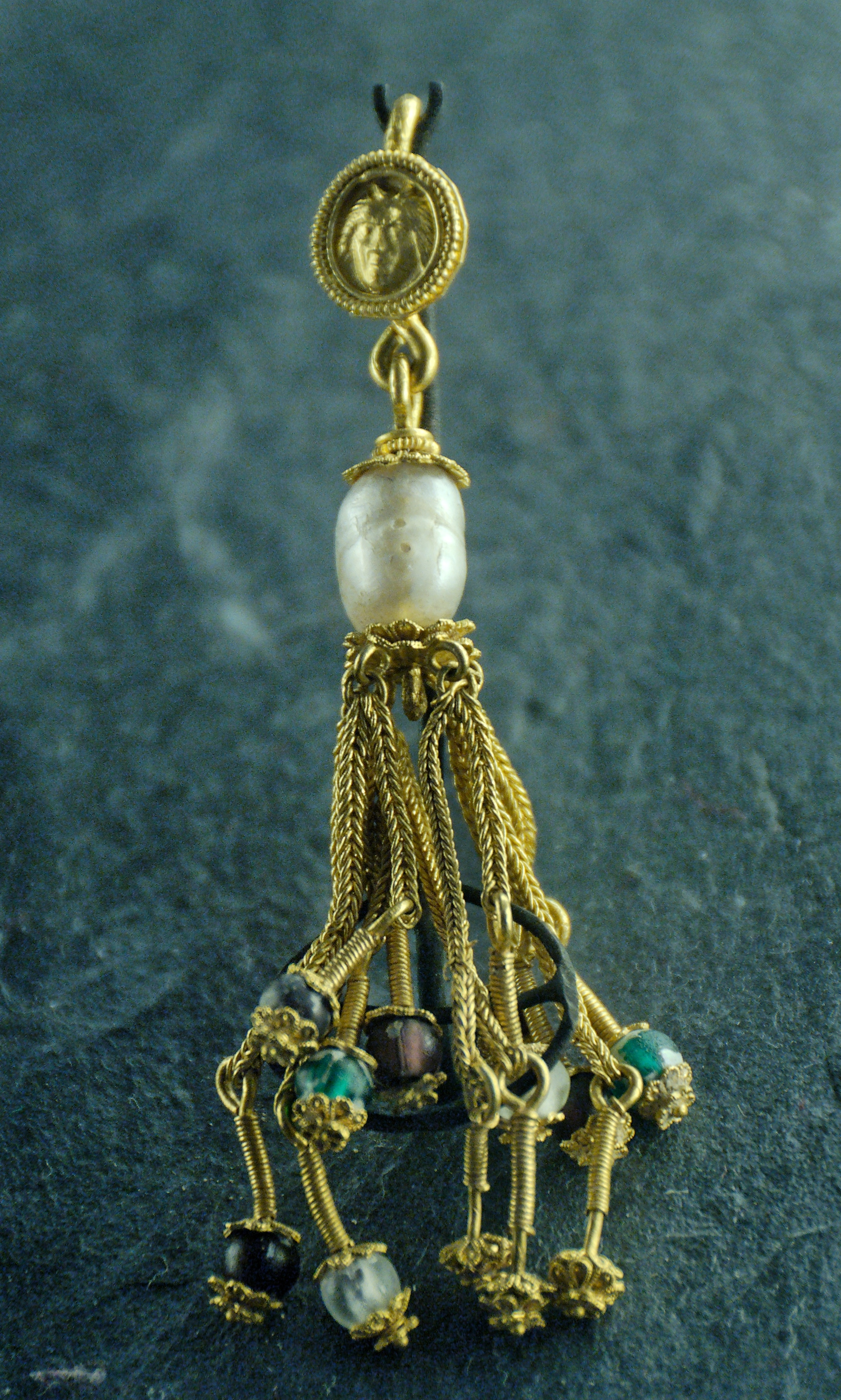
Pendant from a diadem, gold, pearl and glass beads, Greek, 3rd-2nd century BCE, also at the Louvre

In hopes of finding a buyer, the antique gold was entrusted to the Castellani atelier, founded in 1814 by Fortunato Pio Castellani (1794–1865), a goldsmith, antiquarian and collector, whose atelier producing jewellery and goldsmith's work was among the first to take inspiration from the gold of Antiquity that was being recovered by Campana and others from excavations in the Roman Campagna and in Etruria. (Note: A selection of Castellani jewellery is displayed at the Gilbert Collection in London.) Augusto Castellani (1829–1914) studied the Campana gold and made sensitive restorations, which in some examples amount to pastiches assembled from antique fragments, and presented a catalogue. The intimate study of the rare originals suggested to Castellani new techniques of workmanship and the more extensive restorations undertaken during the period which in some cases transformed the originals. Further copies and interpretations were made by Castellani in a refined archaeological taste. The Campana collection of ancient gold, remounted and restored by Castellani was bought by the French State in 1861 and is conserved in the Louvre.

Nine galleries in the Louvre contain the Greek pottery of the Campana collection.

Among the Campana collections, only the numismatic collection of some four hundred Roman and Byzantine gold coins remained in Rome, purchased in 1873 by the administration of the Capitoline Museums, thanks to the interest of Augusto Castellani, who was a founding member of the Commissione Archeologica Comunale, and was named director of the Capitoline Museums the same year. The bequest of his own collection of over nine thousand more coins provided the nucleus of today's public collection.

Campana's "primitive" Italian paintings were purchased by the French State. In 1976 283 Campana paintings received an official home in the new Musée du Petit Palais, Avignon.

Among Campana's paintings were also a series of five frescoes transferred to canvas. The subjects, by the school of Raphael, were completed in 1523–1524 in the Villa Palatina, Rome. They went with the part of the Campana collection that the Russians acquired in 1861 and installed in the State Hermitage Museum in Saint Petersburg.

== Return to Rome ==
After the reunification of Italy, Campana returned to Rome, where he died on 10 October 1880, in the unfruitful process of reclaiming from the Pontificate the profits made on the sales of the Campana Collection, over and above the value it had been pawned for. The city council's project for subsidized housing to be built over the Villa Campana site by the Società edifacatrice italiana having fallen through in 1873, (Note: Approved 31 October, the agreement collapsed 4 November.) the villa came into the possession of a socially prominent English sculptor long established in Rome, Warrington Wood (1839–1886), a professor at the Accademia di San Luca. With the help of an English gardener he soon possessed "the best turf in Rome". The site was subsequently built over.

An exhibition in 2006, Frascati al tempo di Pio IX e del Marchese Campana : ritratto di una città tra cultura antiquaria e moderne strade ferrate set Campana in his cultural context. (Note: Curated by Giovanna Cappelli and Isabella Salvagni. Catalogue published Rome: Campisano, 2006.)

== Sources ==
- Blewett, Octavian (1856). Handbook for travellers in central Italy, Part II: Rome and its Environments (4th ed.). London: John Murray.
- Campana, Giampietro (1840). Di due sepolcri romani del secolo di Augusto scoverti tra la via Latina e l'Appia presso la tomba degli Scipioni (in Italian). Rome: Alessandro Monaldi.
- Campana, Giampietro (1858). Cataloghi del Museo Campana : catalogo della classe 1 - 12 (in Italian). Rome: Johann Daniel Preißler.
- Gaultier, Françoise; Metzger, Catherine, eds. (2005). Trésors antiques : Bijoux de la collection Campana (in French). Paris: 5 Continents Éditions. ISBN 978-887439-272-8.
- Haweis, Mary Eliza (1882). Beautiful Houses: Being A Description of Certain Well-known Artistic Houses. New York: Scribner and Welford.
- Kostof, Spiro (1976). "The Drafting of a Master Plan for Roma Capital: An Exordium". Journal of the Society of Architectural Historians. 35 (1): 5–20. doi:10.2307/988967. JSTOR 988967.
- Lafond, Edmond (1856). Rome : lettres d'un pèlerin Volume 2 (in French). Paris: A. Bray.
- Nadalini, Gianpaolo (1996). "La villa-musée du marquis Campana à Rome au milieu du XIXe siècle". Journal des savants (in French). 2 (2): 419–463. doi:10.3406/jds.1996.1602.
- Robello, Giuseppe (1854). Les curiosités de Rome et de ses environs (in French). Paris: L. Maison.
- Sarti, Susanna (2001). Giovanni Pietro Campana (1808-1880): The Man and His Collection. Oxford: Archaeopress. ISBN 9781903767016. The book contains an annotated version of the 12 sections of the Cataloghi del Museo Campana published in 1858. It is available online from The Beazley Archive.
- Vertova, Luisa (1977). "A new museum is born". The Burlington Magazine. 119 (888): 158–167. JSTOR 878733.
