= 1520 in literature =

| List of years in literature | (table) |
- … 1510; 1511; 1512; 1513; 1514; 1515; 1516; 1517; 1518; 1519; 1520; 1521; 1522; 1523; 1524; 1525; 1526; 1527; 1528; 1529; 1530 …
- Art; Archaeology; Architecture; Literature; Music; Philosophy; Science; +...

This article contains information about the literary events and publications of 1520.

== Events ==
- unknown dates
  - Scholars at Complutense University, Alcalá de Henares, under the direction of Diego Lopez de Zúñiga, complete the Complutensian Polyglot Bible.
  - Ulrich von Hutten's satirical poem Aufwecker der teutschen Nation (Awakener of the German Nation) is published – his earliest work in German.

== New books ==
=== Prose ===
- Hochstratus Ovans
- Martin Luther
  - To the Christian Nobility of the German Nation (An den christlichen Adel deutscher Nation)
  - On the Babylonian Captivity of the Church (De captivitate Babylonica ecclesiae praeludium)
  - On the Freedom of a Christian
- Niccolò Machiavelli – Discourse on Reforming the Government of Florence (Discorso sopra il riformare lo stato di Firenze)
- Shin Maha Thilawuntha – Yazawin Kyaw (Burmese), supplement
- Ruyijun zhuan (claimed completion date)

=== Drama ===
- John Heywood – Johan Johan The Husband
- Approximate year – Niccolò Machiavelli: Andria

=== Poetry ===
- Robert Copland – L'enuoy of Robert Coplande (published in London by Wynkyn de Worde)
- Terence (translated) – Terens in Englysh (published in Paris)
- Approximate year
  - John Lydgate – Testament
  - Alexander the Great
  - The Squire of Low Degree (written c. 1500; published in London by Wynkyn de Worde)

== Births ==
- March 3 – Matthias Flacius, German Lutheran theologian (died 1575)
- unknown date
  - François Baudouin, French humanist historian (died 1573)
  - Natalis Comes, Italian mythologist, poet and historian (died 1582)
  - Denis Lambin, French classicist (died 1572)
- probable
  - Hernando de Acuña, Spanish poet (died 1580)
  - Giovanni Bona de Boliris, Italian humanist, poet and writer, writing in Latin and Italian (died 1572)
  - Thomas Churchyard, English author and poet (died 1604)
  - Pernette Du Guillet, French poet (died 1545)
  - Jorge de Montemor, Portuguese novelist and poet, writing in Spanish (died 1561)
  - Christophe Plantin, French-born Dutch humanist and printer (died 1589)
  - Madeleine Des Roches (Madeleine Neveu), French author, poet and salonnière (died 1587)
  - Alexander Scott, Scottish poet (died 1582/83)
  - Georg Thym, German teacher, poet and writer (died 1560)

== Deaths ==
- March 16 – Martin Waldseemüller, German humanist and cartographer (born c.1470)
- May 31 – Johannes Aesticampianus, German humanist theologian (born 1457)
- unknown date – William Dunbar, Scottish poet (born 1459/60)
