= 1522 in literature =

List of years in literature	(table)
- … 1512; 1513; 1514; 1515; 1516; 1517; 1518; 1519; 1520; 1521; 1522; 1523; 1524; 1525; 1526; 1527; 1528; 1529; 1530; 1531; 1532 …
- Art; Archaeology; Architecture; Literature; Music; Philosophy; Science; +...

This article contains information about the literary events and publications of 1522.

== Events ==
- September 21 – Luther Bible: Martin Luther's translation of the Bible's New Testament into Early New High German from Greek, Das newe Testament Deutzsch, is published in Germany, selling thousands in the first few weeks.
- Luo Guanzhong's 14th-century compilation Romance of the Three Kingdoms is first printed, as Sanguozhi Tongsu Yanyi.

== New books ==
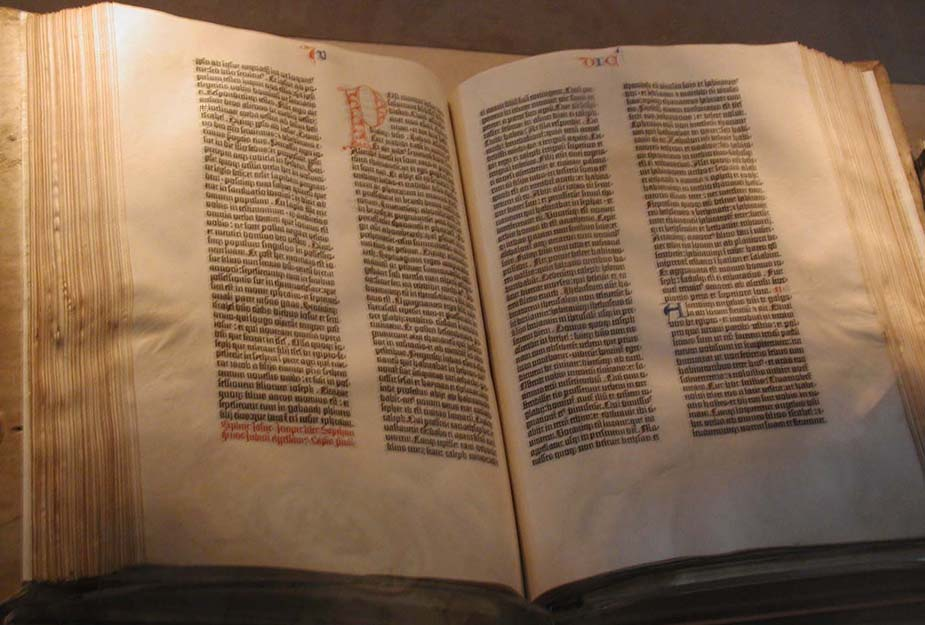
3rd Textus Receptus

=== Prose ===
- Desiderius Erasmus – Novum Testamentum (Greek Textus Receptus of the New Testament, third edition)
- Martin Luther – Against Henry, King of the English (Contra Henricum Regem Anglie)
- Adam Ries – Rechenung auff der Linihen und Federn

=== Drama ===
- Niklaus Manuel Deutsch I – Vom Papst und Christi Gegensatz
- The World and the Child (Mundus et Infans, published)

=== Poetry ===
- Thomas Murner – Von dem grossen Lutherischen Narren ("Of the Great Lutheran Fool")

== Births ==
- February – Jean de Nostredame, Provençal historian (died c.1576)
- June 1 – Dirck Volckertszoon Coornhert, Dutch classical scholar (died 1590)
- unknown dates
  - Joachim du Bellay, French poet (died 1560)
  - Siôn Tudur, Welsh poet (died 1602)

== Deaths ==
- January 25 – Raffaello Maffei, Italian humanist historian and theologian (born 1451)
- February 25 – William Lilye, English classical scholar (born c. 1468)
- June 30 – Johann Reuchlin, German humanist scholar and poet (born 1455)
- September – Gavin Douglas, Scottish poet and bishop (born c. 1474)
