= 1525 in literature =

List of years in literature	(table)
- … 1515; 1516; 1517; 1518; 1519; 1520; 1521; 1522; 1523; 1524; 1525; 1526; 1527; 1528; 1529; 1530; 1531; 1532; 1533; 1534; 1535 …
- Art; Archaeology; Architecture; Literature; Music; Philosophy; Science; +...

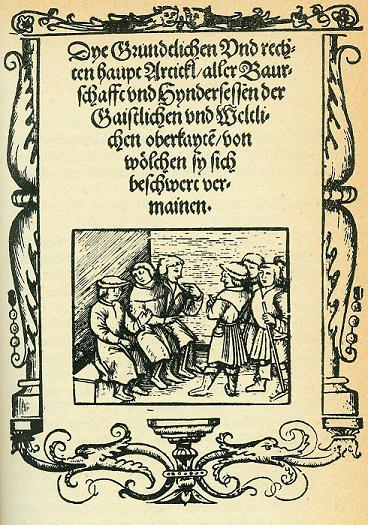

This article contains information about the literary events and publications of 1525.

== Events ==
- July – Michelangelo is in the process of working on the Laurentian Library in Florence.
- September – William Tyndale's New Testament translation into English is made, but printing in Cologne is interrupted by anti-Lutheran forces. (Copies reach England in 1526.)
- unknown dates
  - Printing of Huldrych Zwingli's New Testament 'Zürich Bible' translation into German by Christoph Froschauer begins.
  - Il Petrarco, Allesandro Vellutello's edition of Petrarch first appears. It will be reprinted 29 times in this century.
  - The anonymous early 14th-century poem King Alexander is first printed.

== New books ==
=== Prose ===
- Pietro Bembo – Prose nelle quali si ragiona della volgar lingua (Prose della volgar lingua)
- Albrecht Dürer – Underweysung der Messung mit dem Zirckel und Richtscheyt (literally, "Instructions for Measuring with Compass and Ruler"; also known as The Four Books on Measurement or The Painter's Manual)
- Francesco Giorgi – De harmonia mundi totius
- Martin Luther – On the Bondage of the Will (De Servo Arbitrio)
- Paracelsus – De septem puncti idolotriae christianae (On the Seven Points of Christian Idolatry)
- Antonio Pigafetta – Relazione del primo viaggio intorno al mondo (Report on the First Voyage Around the World; partial publication in Paris)
- The Twelve Articles: The Just and Fundamental Articles of All the Peasantry and Tenants of Spiritual and Temporal Powers by Whom They Think Themselves Oppressed

=== Drama ===
- Niklaus Manuel Deutsch I – Der Ablasskrämer
- Niccolò Machiavelli – Clizia

== Births ==
- March 25 – Richard Edwardes, English choral singer, poet and playwright (died 1566)
- Pir Roshan (بايزيد انصاري), Pashtun warrior poet (died 1582/5)
- Jan van Casembroot, Flemish noble and poet (died 1568)
- probable – Hans Wilhelm Kirchhof, German Landsknecht, baroque poet and translator (died c.1602)

== Deaths ==
- May 27 – Thomas Müntzer, German Protestant theologian, radical economist and poet (born c.1489) (executed)
- approximate year – Jean Lemaire de Belges, Walloon poet and historian resident in France (born c.1473)
