= 1521 in literature =

List of years in literature	(table)
- … 1511; 1512; 1513; 1514; 1515; 1516; 1517; 1518; 1519; 1520; 1521; 1522; 1523; 1524; 1525; 1526; 1527; 1528; 1529; 1530; 1531 …
- Art; Archaeology; Architecture; Literature; Music; Philosophy; Science; +...

This article contains information about the literary events and publications of 1521.

== Events ==
- January 3 – Pope Leo X excommunicates Martin Luther, by the papal bull Decet Romanum Pontificem.
- January 14 – Martin Luther writes to Johann von Staupitz, saying that he has burned the papal bull.
- February 9 – Íñigo López de Mendoza y Zúñiga arrives in Rome to campaign against Erasmus; later in the year he publishes an account of his journey from Spain.
- June (probably 29 or 30) – Neacșu's letter, the oldest surviving dateable document written primarily in the Romanian language (in the Romanian Cyrillic alphabet), is approximately dated to this month.
- August 13 – Marko Marulić's poem Judita (Judith, written 1501), a landmark in Croatian literature, is printed in Venice by Guglielmo da Fontaneto.

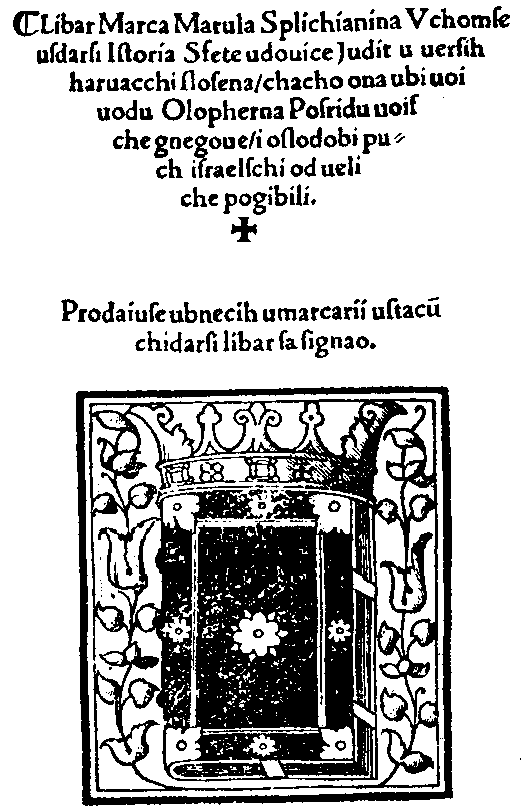
Marko Marulić's Judita

- unknown date – John Siberch is active in Cambridge, the city's earliest known printer.

== New books ==
=== Prose ===
- Codex Ňuu Tnoo - Ndisi Nuu
- Jacopo Berengario da Carpi – Commentaria cum amplissimus additionibus super anatomiam Mundini (published in Bologna), containing the first printed anatomical illustrations taken from nature
- Goražde Psalter
- Henry VIII of England – Defence of the Seven Sacraments (Assertio Septem Sacramentorum)
- Niccolò Machiavelli – The Art of War (Dell'arte della guerra)
- Piri Reis – Kitab-ı Bahriye

=== Poetry ===
- Alexander Barclay – The Boke of Codrus and Mynalcas, the author's "Fourth Eclog"
- Henry Bradshaw – The Life of St. Werburgh
- Andrew Chertsey, The Passyon of Oure Lorde, translated from French with additional verses inserted and introductory poem by Robert Copland (published in London by Wynkyn de Worde)
- Christmas Carols, including "A caroll of huntynge" and "A carol bringyng in the bores heed"
- Robert Copland – Introductory verse to The Myrrour & the Chyrche (published in London by Wynkyn de Worde)

Approximate year

- A boke of a Ghoostly fader (A Book of a Ghostly Father, published in London by Wynkyn de Worde)
- John Skelton, "The Tunnyng of Elynour Rummyng"

== Births ==
- May 8 – Peter Canisius, German theologian (died 1597)
- unknown dates
  - Sir Thomas Chaloner the elder, English statesman and poet (died 1565)
  - Xu Wei (徐渭), Chinese painter, poet and dramatist (died 1593)
- probable
  - Anne Askew, English poet and Protestant martyr (burned at the stake 1546)
  - Jorge de Montemor, Portuguese novelist and poet writing in Spanish (died 1561)
  - Pontus de Tyard, French poet and priest, a member of La Pléiade (died 1605)

== Deaths ==
- May 10 – Sebastian Brant, German satirical poet and humanist (born c. 1457)
- unknown date– Jean Bourdichon, French illuminator of manuscripts (born 1457/9)
