= 1581 in literature =

List of years in literature	(table)
- … 1571; 1572; 1573; 1574; 1575; 1576; 1577; 1578; 1579; 1580; 1581; 1582; 1583; 1584; 1585; 1586; 1587; 1588; 1589; 1590; 1591 …
- Art; Archaeology; Architecture; Literature; Music; Philosophy; Science; +...

This article contains information about the literary events and publications of 1581.

== Events ==
- January – Francis Bacon takes his seat as an MP in the Parliament of England for the Cornish pocket borough of Bossiney.
- June 24 – Torquato Tasso's epic poem Jerusalem Delivered (La Gerusalemme liberata) is first published complete, a pirated edition printed in Parma being followed by an authorized edition from Ferrara, where the poet is confined in the Ospedale di Sant'Anna. Also this year, Aldus Manutius the Younger prints a selection of Tasso's lyrics and prose in Venice.

Uncertain dates

- Stationer Thomas Marsh publishes Seneca's Tragedies in English, a collected edition of ten dramas written by Seneca the Younger (or attributed to him), translated by Jasper Heywood, John Studley, Alexander Neville, Thomas Newton, and Thomas Nuce. Most of the texts have been printed previously, from 1559 onward; but Newton's version of Thebais is new, and earlier printed texts of Studley's versions of Hercules Oetaeus and Hippolytus, if they ever existed, have not survived.
- John Dee starts to write Libri mysteriorum I-XVIII (Spiritual Diaries).
- First record of bookselling at No. 1, Trinity Street, Cambridge, England; it will continue to be a bookshop for at least 430 years.

== New books ==
- Church of Scotland – The Second Book of Discipline
- William Lambarde – Eirenarcha: or of the Office of the Justices of Peace
- Ostrog Bible
- Barnabe Riche – Riche his Farewell to Militarie Profession conteining verie pleasaunt discourses fit for a peaceable tyme

== New drama ==
- Edward Forsett – Pedantius (Latin)
- George Peele – The Arraignment of Paris (a pastoral)
- Nathaniel Woodes – The Conflict of Conscience

== Poetry ==
- Torquato Tasso – Jerusalem Delivered

== Births ==
- January 4 – James Ussher, Anglo-Irish archbishop and scholar (died 1656)
- March 16 – Pieter Corneliszoon Hooft, Dutch Golden Age writer (died 1647)
- June 18 (date of baptism) – Thomas Overbury, English poet and essayist (died 1613)
- August 15 – Jeremias Drexel, German Jesuit writer (died 1638)
- November 11 (date of baptism) – Henry Adamson, Scottish poet and historian (died 1637)

Uncertain dates

- Christoph Helvig, German historian and theologian (died 1617)
- Charles Malapert, Belgian Jesuit writer (died 1630)
- Hieronim Morsztyn, Polish poet (died 1623)

Probable year

- Juan Ruiz de Alarcón, Mexican dramatist (died 1639)

== Deaths ==
- June 16 – Thomas Wilson, English rhetorician (born 1524)
- September 1 – Guru Ram Das, Sikh guru (born 1534)
- September 6 – Guillaume Postel, French linguist (born 1510)
- September 28 – Achilles Statius, Portuguese humanist writer (born 1524)
- September 29 Andreas Musculus, German theologian (born 1514)
- November 7 – Richard Davies, Welsh bishop and scholar (born c. 1505)

Uncertain dates

- Georgette de Montenay, French courtier and author of emblem book (born 1540)
- Morys Clynnog, Welsh author writing in Welsh (born c. 1525)
- Nicholas Sanders, English Catholic propagandist (born 1530)
