= 1524 in literature =

List of years in literature	(table)
- … 1514; 1515; 1516; 1517; 1518; 1519; 1520; 1521; 1522; 1523; 1524; 1525; 1526; 1527; 1528; 1529; 1530; 1531; 1532; 1533; 1534 …
- Art; Archaeology; Architecture; Literature; Music; Philosophy; Science; +...

This article presents lists of the literary events and publications in 1524.

== Events ==
- probable – Eyn Gespräch von dem gemaynen Schwabacher Kasten ("als durch Brüder Hainrich, Knecht Ruprecht, Kemerin, Spüler, und irem Maister, des Handtwercks der Wüllen Tuchmacher") is published in Nuremberg, Germany, the first publication in the "Schwabacher" blackletter typeface.

== New books ==
- Petrus Apianus – Cosmographicus liber (Landshut)
- Philippe de Commines – Mémoires (Part 1: Books 1–6; first publication; Paris)
- Desiderius Erasmus – De libero arbitrio diatribe sive collatio ("The Freedom of the Will"; Antwerp, September)
- Martin Luther and Paul Speratus – Etlich Cristlich Lider: Lobgesang un Psalm ("Achtliederbuch"), the first Lutheran hymnal (Wittenberg)
- Martin Luther and others – Eyn Enchiridion oder Handbüchlein (the "Erfurt Enchiridion"), two editions of a hymnal printed respectively by Johannes Loersfeld and Matthes Maler (Erfurt), including Luther's hymn "Christ lag in Todes Banden"
- Jacques Merlin – Quatuor concilium generalium Paris: Jean Cornilleau für Galliot du Pré
- Adam Ries – Coß
- Johann Walter – Eyn geystlich Gesangk Buchleyn ("A sacred little hymnal") (Wittenberg), including Luther's chorale "Gelobet seist du, Jesu Christ"

== New poetry ==
- Robert Copland – Epilogue to the Syege of Rodes (London)

== New drama ==
- Ludovico Ariosto – I suppositi (1509, first publication, in prose)
- Niklaus Manuel Deutsch I – Vom Papst und seiner Priesterschaft
- Niccolò Machiavelli – The Mandrake (La Mandragola, first published)

== Births ==
- May 28 – Selim II, Ottoman Turkish sultan and poet (died 1574)
- September 11 – Pierre de Ronsard, French poet (died 1585)
- Unknown date – Thomas Tusser, English agriculturalist, poet and chorister (died 1580)
- Approximate year of birth
  - Luís de Camões, Portuguese national poet (died 1580)
  - Louise Labé, French poet (died 1566)
  - Girolamo Parabosco, Italian poet and musician (died 1577)

== Deaths ==
- January 5 – Marko Marulić of Split, Croatian Christian humanist and poet (born 1450)
- January 7 (or 1523) – Tang Yin (唐寅, also Tang Bohu, 唐伯), Chinese scholar, poet and calligrapher (born 1470)
- October 20 – Thomas Linacre, English humanist scholar, grammarian and physician (born 1470)
- unknown date – Giovanni Aurelio Augurello, Italian humanist scholar and alchemist writing Latin poetry (born 1456)
