= 1519 in literature =

List of years in literature	(table)
- … 1509; 1510; 1511; 1512; 1513; 1514; 1515; 1516; 1517; 1518; 1519; 1520; 1521; 1522; 1523; 1524; 1525; 1526; 1527; 1528; 1529 …
- Art; Archaeology; Architecture; Literature; Music; Philosophy; Science; +...

This article presents lists of the literary events and publications in 1519.

== Events ==
- The chivalric romance Libro del muy esforzado e invencible caballero Don Claribalte (Book of the most vigorous and invincible knight Don Claribalte), the first literary work by Gonzalo Fernández de Oviedo y Valdés, is published in Valencia (Spain) by Juan Viñao. In the foreword (dedicated to Ferdinand, Duke of Calabria), Oviedo relates that the work has been conceived and written in the Captaincy General of Santo Domingo (the Caribbean island of Hispaniola), where he has been working since 1514, allowing it to claim to be the first literary work created in the New World.

== New books ==
=== Prose ===
- Lopo Homem, Pedro Reinel and Jorge Reinel (illustrated by António de Holanda) – "Miller Atlas"
- William Horman – Vulgaria
- John Rastell – The Abbreviacion of Statutis

=== Drama ===
- John Rastell – The Four Elements (A new Interlude and a Mery of the Elements, approximate date)

=== Poetry ===
- Bergadis – Apokopos (first book in Modern Greek)
- Thomas Murner – Geuchmat ("Meadow of Fools")
- Santikirti – Santinatha Purana
- Timanna – Parijatapahanannamu

== Births ==
- February 19 – Froben Christoph of Zimmern, Swabian noble and chronicler (died 1566)
- March 17 – Thoinot Arbeau, born Jehan Tabourot, French priest and writer (died 1596)
- May 27 – Girolamo Mei, Italian humanist historian (died 1594)
- Unknown date – Gutierre de Cetina, Spanish poet and soldier (died 1554)
- 1519 or 1520 – Nicholas Grimald, English poet and translator (died 1562)

== Deaths ==
- May 9 – Jodocus Trutfetter, German philosopher and theologian (born 1460)
- June 30 – Wigand Wirt, German theologian (born 1460)
- September 10 – John Colet, English churchman and Biblical scholar, best known for his sermons (born 1467)
- December 25 – Rudolph von Langen, German Catholic humanist and poet (born c.1438)
- Unknown dates
  - Anna Bülow, Swedish abbess, writer and translator
  - William Grocyn, English scholar, friend and executor of Erasmus
  - Ferceirtne Ó Curnín, Irish poet
  - Domhnall Glas Ó Curnín, Irish poet
