= 1583 in literature =

List of years in literature	(table)
- … 1573; 1574; 1575; 1576; 1577; 1578; 1579; 1580; 1581; 1582; 1583; 1584; 1585; 1586; 1587; 1588; 1589; 1590; 1591; 1592; 1593 …
- Art; Archaeology; Architecture; Literature; Music; Philosophy; Science; +...

This article presents lists of the literary events and publications in 1583.

== Events ==
- Early – Accademia della Crusca established in Florence to regulate the Italian language.
- March 10 – Queen Elizabeth's Men, an acting company, is founded in England by order of Queen Elizabeth I to Edmund Tilney, the royal Master of the Revels.
- June 11 – Rivales, a play in Latin by William Gager, is acted by members of Christ Church, Oxford. Criticized for its "filth", it is never printed and does not survive, although it is revived for two performances in 1592, one before Queen Elizabeth I.
- June 12 – Dido, another play in Latin by Gager, is performed by members of Christ Church, Oxford.
- September – The English occult philosopher John Dee leaves England to travel on the Continent; his library at Mortlake is dispersed in his absence.
- Lodewijk Elzevir produces the first publication from the House of Elzevir in Leiden, Drusii Ebraicarum quaestionum ac responsionum libri duo.

== New books ==
=== Prose ===
- Justus Lipsius – De Constantia (On constancy)
- Joseph Justus Scaliger – De emendatione temporum (Study on the Improvement of Time)
- Sir Thomas Smith – De Republica Anglorum: the Maner of Gouernement or Policie of the Realme of England (written 1562–65)
- Philip Stubbes – The Anatomy of Abuses

=== Drama ===
- William Gager – Dido (Latin)
- Luigi Groto – La Dalida
- Richard Mulcaster – Ariodante and Genevra

=== Poetry ===
See 1583 in poetry

== Births ==
- January 8 – Simon Episcopius, Dutch theologian (died 1643)
- February 2 – Anna Visscher, Dutch artist, poet and translator (died 1651)
- April 4 – Franciscus Quaresmius, Italian writer (died 1650)
- April 10 – Hugo Grotius, Dutch philosopher, dramatist and poet (died 1645 in literature)
- November – Philip Massinger, English playwright (died 1640)
- Unknown dates
  - Johann Heinrich Alting, German theologian (died 1644)
  - John Beaumont, English poet (died 1627)

== Deaths ==
- January 1 – François de Belleforest, French poet and translator (born 1530)
- January 5 – Juan Maldonado, Spanish Jesuit theologian (born 1533)
- March 4 – Bernard Gilpin, English theologian (born 1517)
- April – Lucas David, Prussian historian (born 1503)
- May 6 – Zacharias Ursinus, German theologian (born 1534)
- July 8 – Fernão Mendes Pinto, Portuguese explorer and memoirist (born c. 1509)
- December 31 – Thomas Erastus, Swiss theologian (born 1524)
- Unknown dates
  - Alexander Arbuthnot, Scottish poet (born 1538)
  - Henry Bynneman, English printer (date of birth unknown)
