= 1526 in literature =

List of years in literature	(table)
- … 1516; 1517; 1518; 1519; 1520; 1521; 1522; 1523; 1524; 1525; 1526; 1527; 1528; 1529; 1530; 1531; 1532; 1533; 1534; 1535; 1536 …
- Art; Archaeology; Architecture; Literature; Music; Philosophy; Science; +...

This article contains information about the literary events and publications of 1526.

== Events ==
- Spring – The first complete printed translation of the New Testament into English, by William Tyndale (anonymously), arrives in England from Germany, printing having been completed in Worms by Peter Schöffer the younger, with other copies being printed in Amsterdam.
- c. September – Following the Battle of Mohács, the Bibliotheca Corviniana in Ofen is destroyed by troops of the Ottoman Empire.
- September 6 – The first complete Dutch-language translation of the Bible is printed by Jacob van Liesvelt in Antwerp.
- October – Cuthbert Tunstall, Bishop of London, attempts to collect all copies of Tyndale's New Testament in his diocese and burn them.
- unknown dates
  - The New Testament is translated into Swedish, as the first such official translation, made by Olaus Petri under royal patronage.
  - An edition of the Bible, Biblia Sacra, is printed by Yolande Bonhomme in Paris, the first to be printed by a woman.

== New books ==
=== Prose ===
- A Hundred Merry Tales (A C. Mary Talys, printed by John Rastell and perhaps compiled by John Heywood)
- Martin Luther – The Sacrament of the Body and Blood of Christ – Against the Fanatics (Sakrament des Leibes and Blutes Christi wider die Schwarmgeister)
- William Tyndale – New Testament Bible translation, part of the Tyndale Bible

=== Drama ===
- Niccolò Machiavelli – The Mandrake (La Mandragola, first performance)

=== Poetry ===
- Teofilo Folengo (as "Limerno Pitocco da Mantova") – Orlandino
- Jacopo Sannazaro
  - De Partu Virginis
  - Piscatoria
- Shin Maha Rahtathara – Kogan Pyo

== Births ==
- March 11 – Heinrich Rantzau, German humanist, astrologer and bibliophile (died 1598)
- unknown dates
  - Bâkî (باقى), born Mahmud Abdülbâkî (محمود عبد الباقى), Ottoman Turkish poet (died 1600)
  - Tani Soyo (谷宗養), Japanese renga poet (died 1563)

== Deaths ==
- unknown date – Jean Marot, French poet (born c. 1450)
