= 1528 in literature =

List of years in literature	(table)
- … 1518; 1519; 1520; 1521; 1522; 1523; 1524; 1525; 1526; 1527; 1528; 1529; 1530; 1531; 1532; 1533; 1534; 1535; 1536; 1537; 1538 …
- Art; Archaeology; Architecture; Literature; Music; Philosophy; Science; +...

This article contains information about the literary events and publications of 1528.

== Events ==
- October 2 – William Tyndale's The Obedience of a Christian Man (The Obedience of a Christen man, and how Christen rulers ought to govern) is printed in Antwerp for clandestine distribution in England.

== New books ==
- Baltissare Castiglione – The Book of the Courtier (Il Cortegiano)
- Jacques Lefèvre d'Étaples – Ancien Testament (translation of the Old Testament into French)
- Francisco Delicado – Portrait of Lozana: The Lusty Andalusian Woman (Retrato de la Loçana andaluza)
- Desiderius Erasmus – Ciceronianus
- Jean Fernel – Cosmotheoria
- Martin Luther – Confession Concerning Christ's Supper (Vom Abendmahl Christi, Bekenntnis)
- William Tyndale – The Obedience of a Christian Man

== New drama ==
- Ludovico Ariosto
  - La Lena
  - Il Negromante (approximate date of first performance)

== New poetry ==
- Anna Bijns – Refrains

== Births ==
- November 2 – Petrus Lotichius Secundus, born Peter Lotz, German scholar and Latin poet (died 1560)
- unknown dates
  - Rémy Belleau, French poet (died 1577)
  - Birbal, born Maheshdas Bhat, Indian poet, wit and Grand Vizier of the Mughal court (died 1586)
  - Jean-Jacques Boissard, French antiquary and Latin poet (died 1602)
  - Henri Estienne, French printer and classical scholar (died 1598)
  - António Ferreira, Portuguese poet (died 1569)
  - Atagi Fuyuyasu (安宅 冬康), Japanese samurai and poet (died 1564)
  - Phùng Khắc Khoan, Vietnamese military strategist, politician, diplomat and poet (died 1613)
  - Thomas Whythorne, English composer and autobiographer (died 1595)

== Deaths ==
- March 10 – Balthasar Hubmaier, German Anabaptist theologian (born c.1480)
- November 17 – Jakob Wimpfeling, humanist and theologian (born 1450)
- unknown dates
  - Al-Birjandi, Persian scientist
  - Richard Hyrde, English scholar and translator
  - Erhard Ratdolt, German printer (born 1442)
- probable – Giorgio Anselmo, Italian physician and Latin poet (born c.1458)
