= 1530 in literature =

List of years in literature	(table)
- … 1520; 1521; 1522; 1523; 1524; 1525; 1526; 1527; 1528; 1529; 1530; 1531; 1532; 1533; 1534; 1535; 1536; 1537; 1538; 1539; 1540 …
- Art; Archaeology; Architecture; Literature; Music; Philosophy; Science; +...

This article contains information about the literary events and publications of 1530.

== Events ==
- January – The first printed translation of the Torah into English, by William Tyndale, is published in Antwerp for distribution in Britain.
- May – The Tyndale Bible is publicly burned in England as heretical.
- unknown dates
  - First complete edition of the 'Zürich Bible', Huldrych Zwingli's translation into German printed by Christoph Froschauer, is published.
  - An edition of Desiderius Erasmus's Paraphrasis in Elegantiarum Libros Laurentii Vallae is the first book to use the Roman form of the Garamond typeface cut by Claude Garamond.
  - Paracelsus finishes writing Paragranum and leaves Nuremberg.
  - This is the earliest likely date for first printing of the Middle English tail-rhyme chivalric romance Sir Isumbras and of Sir Lamwell.

== New books ==
=== Prose ===
- Otto Brunfels – Herbarum vivae eicones (third part: 1536)
- Erasmus – A handbook on manners for children (De Civilitate Morum Puerilium Libellus)
- William Tyndale – The Practice of Prelates

=== Drama ===
- Henry Medwall – Nature (first printing)
- John Heywood – The Play called the foure PP; a newe and a very mery interlude of a palmer, a pardoner, a potycary, a pedler

=== Poetry ===
- Pietro Bembo – Rime
- Girolamo Fracastoro – Syphilis sive morbus gallicus
- Hans Sachs – Das Schlaraffenland

== Births ==
- July 3 – Claude Fauchet, French historian (died 1601)
- August 2 – Girolamo Mercuriale, Italian physician and philologist (died 1606)
- November 1 – Étienne de La Boétie, French judge, philosopher and essayist (died 1563)
- Unknown dates
  - Jerónimo Bermúdez, Spanish playwright and poet (died 1599)
  - Jean Bodin, French political philosopher (died 1596)
  - François de Belleforest, French poet and translator (died 1582)
  - Pey de Garros, Occitan poet writing in Gascon (died 1585)
  - Baltasar del Alcázar, Spanish poet (died 1606)
  - Thomas Hoby, English diplomat and translator (died 1566)
  - Jan Kochanowski, Polish poet also writing in Latin (died 1584)
  - William Stevenson, English clergyman and presumed playwright (died 1575)
- Approximate years
  - Judah Moscato, Italian rabbi, poet and philosopher (died 1593)
  - Richard Tarlton, English actor (died 1588)

== Deaths ==
- April 27 (one source states August 6) – Jacopo Sannazaro, Neapolitan poet, humanist and epigrammist also writing in Latin (born 1458)
- April 28 – Niklaus Manuel, Swiss playwright writing in German and artist (born 1484)
- August 28 – Gerold Edlibach, Swiss chronicler (born 1454)
- December 22 – Willibald Pirckheimer, German humanist writer (born 1470)
- Unknown date – Molla, Indian poet writing in Telugu, translator of the Ramayana (born 1440)
- probable – Juan del Encina, Spanish poet, musician and playwright (born 1468)
