= 1636 in literature =

List of years in literature	(table)
- … 1626; 1627; 1628; 1629; 1630; 1631; 1632; 1633; 1634; 1635; 1636; 1637; 1638; 1639; 1640; 1641; 1642; 1643; 1644; 1645; 1646 …
- Art; Archaeology; Architecture; Literature; Music; Philosophy; Science; +...

This article contains information about the literary events and publications of 1636.

== Events ==
- January 31 – The King's Men perform Shakespeare's Julius Caesar at St James's Palace, London.
- February – James Shirley's tragicomedy The Duke's Mistress is performed at St James's Palace.
- March 3 – A "great charter" to the University of Oxford establishes the Oxford University Press as the second of England's privileged presses.
- April – Thomas Hobbes travels from Rome to Florence.
- May 10 – London theatres close, and remain almost continuously closed until the end of the year (and on to October 1637), due to an outbreak of bubonic plague. Playing companies are profoundly impacted; the King's Revels Men dissolve and other companies tour the countryside to survive.
- June – Tommaso Campanella, having left Italy for France, because of his pro-French views, gives a speech in front of Cardinal Richelieu; he teaches at the Sorbonne.
- August – King Charles I and Queen Henrietta Maria visit the University of Oxford. They are entertained with college theatricals, including William Strode's allegory The Floating Island (with music by Henry Lawes), which mocks William Prynne as the play-hating Melancholico; George Wilde's Love's Hospital; and William Cartwright's The Royal Slave (also with Lawes' music and design by Inigo Jones). Henrietta Maria enjoys the last so much that she brings it to be performed at Hampton Court by her Queen Henrietta's Men.
- November – Compilation of the Irish language Annals of the Four Masters is completed by Mícheál Ó Cléirigh, assisted by Cú Choigcríche Ó Cléirigh, Fearfeasa Ó Maol Chonaire and Peregrine Ó Duibhgeannain, in the Franciscan friary in Donegal Town in Ireland, under the patronage of Fearghal Ó Gadhra.
- December 8 – The King's Men perform Shakespeare's Othello at Hampton Court Palace.

== New books ==
- Athanasius Kircher – Prodromus Coptus, First grammar of the Coptic language
- Sir Henry Blount – A Voyage to the Levant
- Juan Pérez de Montalbán – Fama póstuma a la vida y muerte de Lope de Vega Carpio
- Salvador Jacinto Polo de Medina – Hospital de incurables y Viaje de este mundo y el otro
- Cristóbal de Salazar Mardones – Ilustración y defensa de la Fábula de Píramo y Tisbe
- José García de Salcedo Coronel – Comentario a las Soledades de Góngora

== New drama ==
- Richard Brome – The New Academy
- Lodowick Carlell – Arviragus and Philicia
- William Cartwright – The Royal Slave
- John Cayworth – Enchiridion Christiados (masque)
- Pierre Corneille – L'Illusion Comique, performed
- Sir William Davenant – The Triumphs of the Prince D'Amour (masque), The Wits, and The Platonick Lovers published
- Pierre Corneille – Le Cid
- Henry Glapthorne – The Hollander and perhaps Wit in a Constable
- François Tristan l'Hermite – La Mariane
- Thomas Heywood – A Challenge for Beauty published
- Thomas Killigrew – Claracilla
- Philip Massinger – The Bashful Lover performed; The Great Duke of Florence published
- Pedro Calderón de la Barca
  - Casa con dos puertas mala es de guardar
  - La dama duende
  - La devoción de la cruz
  - La vida es sueño
- Parte XXX de comedias de varios autores
- Tirso de Molina –
  - La vida de Herodes
  - Marta la piadosa
- Thomas Nabbes – Microcosmus, a Moral Masque
- Jean Rotrou – Les Deux Sosies
- William Sampson – The Vow-Breaker, or The Fayre Maid of Clifton
- James Shirley – The Duke's Mistress
- William Strode – The Floating Island
- George Wilde – Love's Hospital

== New poetry ==
- Abraham Cowley – Sylva (in the 2nd edition of his collection Poetical Blossoms)
- William Sampson – Virtus post Funera vivit, or Honour Tryumphing over Death, being true Epitomes of Honorable, Noble, Learned, and Hospitable Personages

== Births ==
- April 7 – Gregório de Matos, Brazilian poet (died 1696)
- November 1 – Nicolas Boileau-Despréaux, French poet and critic (died 1711)
- November 11 – Yan Ruoqu (閻若璩), Chinese scholar and polymath (died 1704)
- Unknown dates
  - Joseph Glanvill, English philosopher and cleric (died 1680)
  - James Janeway, English children's writer and Puritan minister (died 1674)
  - Jean de Montigny, French poet and philosopher (died 1671)
- Probable year of birth – Thomas Traherne, English poet and religious writer (died 1674)

== Deaths ==
- January 19 – Daniel Schwenter, German Orientalist, polymath, poet and librarian (born 1585)
- February 4 – James Perrot, Welsh politician and philosophical writer (born 1571)
- April 26 – Paul Hay du Chastelet, French orator and writer (born 1592
- August 25 – Bhai Gurdas, Punjabi Sikh scholar (born 1551)
- September 15 – Cuthbert Burbage, English theatre owner, associate of William Shakespeare (born 1566)
- December 9 – Fabian Birkowski, Polish writer and preacher (born 1566)
- Unknown dates
  - Henning Arnisaeus, German political theorist and philosopher (born 1570)
  - Johannes Messenius, Swedish dramatist and historian (born 1579)
  - Cesare Rinaldi, Italian poet (born 1559)
  - Wen Zhenmeng (文震孟), Chinese artist and author (born 1574)
- Probable date
  - Antonio Mira de Amescua, Spanish dramatist (born c. 1578)
  - William Sampson, English dramatist (born c. 1590)
