= 1570 in literature =

List of years in literature	(table)
- … 1560; 1561; 1562; 1563; 1564; 1565; 1566; 1567; 1568; 1569; 1570; 1571; 1572; 1573; 1574; 1575; 1576; 1577; 1578; 1579; 1580 …
- Art; Archaeology; Architecture; Literature; Music; Philosophy; Science; +...

This article contains information about the literary events and publications of 1570.

== Events ==
- December (approximate date) – Torquato Tasso travels to Paris in the service of Cardinal Luigi d'Este.
- unknown date – The Académie de Poésie et de Musique is founded in France by the poet Jean-Antoine de Baïf and the musician Joachim Thibault de Courville.

== New books ==
=== Prose ===
- Roger Ascham – The Scholemaster (posthumous)
- William Baldwin – Beware the Cat (new edition)
- Thomas North – The Fables of Bidpai: The Morall Philosophie of Doni (translation of the Panchatantra from the Italian of Anton Francesco Doni)
- Abraham Ortelius – Theatrum Orbis Terrarum (the first modern atlas)

=== Poetry ===
- See 1570 in poetry

== Births ==
- October 4 – Péter Pázmány, Hungarian philosopher and theologian (died 1637)
- December 29 – Wilhelm Lamormaini, Netherlandish theologian (died 1648)
- Unknown dates
  - Sir Robert Aytoun, Scottish poet (died 1638)
  - Pedro de Oña, Chilean poet (died 1643)
  - Alexander Leighton, Scottish pamphleteer (died 1649)

== Deaths ==
- February 28 – Domingo de Santo Tomás, Spanish grammarian (born 1499)
- March 25 – Johann Walter, German poet and composer (born 1496)
- July 3 – Aonio Paleario, Italian humanist, reformer and pamphleteer (born c. 1500)
- October 20 – João de Barros, Portuguese historian (born 1496)
- November – Jacques Grévin, French dramatist (born c. 1539)
