= 1573 in literature =

List of years in literature	(table)
- … 1563; 1564; 1565; 1566; 1567; 1568; 1569; 1570; 1571; 1572; 1573; 1574; 1575; 1576; 1577; 1578; 1579; 1580; 1581; 1582; 1583 …
- Art; Archaeology; Architecture; Literature; Music; Philosophy; Science; +...

This article contains information about the literary events and publications of 1573.

== Events ==
- Torquato Tasso's pastoral play Aminta is first performed by I Gelosi in palace gardens in Ferrara.

== New books ==
=== Drama ===
- Anonymous – New Custom (published)
- Jean de La Taille – La Famine, ou les Gabéonites
- George Gascoigne (published in A Hundred Sundry Flowers)
  - Jocasta
  - Supposes
  - The Montague Masque
- Torquato Tasso – Aminta

=== Poetry ===
- Jean-Antoine de Baïf – Œuvres en rime (Works in verse)
- George Gascoigne – A Hundred Sundry Flowers Bound Up in One Small Poesy... (first collected edition of his verse and drama)
- See also 1573 in poetry

== Births ==
- November 30 – Aubert Miraeus, Netherlandish ecclesiastical historian (died 1640 in literature)
- December 21 – Mathurin Régnier, French satirist (died 1613 in literature)
- Unknown dates
  - Severin Binius, German historian (died 1641 in literature)
  - Daniel Naborowski, Polish poet (died 1640 in literature)
- Approximate year of birth – Samuel Rowlands, English prose and verse pamphleteer (died 1630)

== Deaths ==
- January 1 – Johann Pfeffinger, German Protestant theologian (born 1493)
- February – William Lauder, Scottish poet (born c. 1520)
- May 14 (burial) – Richard Grafton, English merchant and printer (born c.1506/7)
- July – Étienne Jodelle, French dramatist and poet (born 1532)
- October 24 – François Baudouin, French controversialist and historian (born 1520)
- November 17 – Juan Ginés de Sepúlveda, Spanish philosopher and theologian (born 1494)
- December – Donato Giannotti, Italian political writer, playwright and poet (born 1492)
- December 30 – Giovanni Battista Giraldi, Italian novelist and poet (born 1504)
- Late – Reginald Wolfe, English printer
- Unknown dates
  - Richard Grafton, English chronicler and King's Printer (born c. 1506–1511)
  - Paul Skalich, Croatian encyclopedist (born 1534)
