= 1590 in literature =

List of years in literature	(table)
- … 1580; 1581; 1582; 1583; 1584; 1585; 1586; 1587; 1588; 1589; 1590; 1591; 1592; 1593; 1594; 1595; 1596; 1597; 1598; 1599; 1600 …
- Art; Archaeology; Architecture; Literature; Music; Philosophy; Science; +...

This article presents lists of the literary events and publications in 1590.

== Events ==
- January – The Children of Paul's perform at the English Court twice in the first week; one of the plays act may be John Lyly's Midas. Later this year they are banned from performing over of the involvement of Lily, their chief script-writer, in the Marprelate controversy.
- unknown date – The Teatro all'antica at Sabbioneta (Italy), designed by Vincenzo Scamozzi, is completed.

== New books ==
- Robert Greene
  - Greene's Mourning Garment
  - Never Too Late
- Thomas Lodge – Rosalynde
- Thomas Nashe – An Almond for a Parrat

== New drama ==
- Anonymous (approximate date)
  - Fair Em, the Miller's Daughter of Manchester
  - King Leir
  - Mucedorus
- Robert Greene
  - The Comical History of Alphonsus, King of Aragon (approximate date)
  - The History of Orlando Furioso
  - The Scottish History of James the Fourth (approximate date)
  - with Thomas Lodge – A Looking Glass for London (approximate date)
- Christopher Marlowe – Tamburlaine (both parts published)
- George Peele – Famous Chronicle of King Edward the First
- Robert Wilson – The Three Lords and Three Ladies of London (published)

== Poetry ==
- Sir Philip Sidney – Arcadia
- Edmund Spenser – The Faerie Queene, Books 1–3

== Births ==
- January 30 – Lady Anne Clifford, English literary patron (died 1676)
- March 18 – Manuel de Faria e Sousa, Portuguese historian and poet (died 1649)
- June 24 – Samuel Ampzing, Dutch poet (died 1632)
- July 26 – Johannes Crellius, German-born Polish theologian (died 1633)
- September 12 – María de Zayas, Spanish poet and dramatist (died 1661)
- October 11 (or December) – William Pynchon, English-born New England theologian (died 1662)
- unknown dates
  - Alonso Andrada, Spanish biographer (died 1672)
  - François Annat, French anti-Jansenist theologian (died 1670)
  - Thomas Carve, Irish historian writing in Latin (died c. 1672)
  - Faqi Tayran, Kurdish poet (died 1660)
  - Grigore Ureche, Moldavian chronicler (died 1647)
  - Théophile de Viau, French poet and dramatist (died 1626)

== Deaths ==
- January 7 – Jakob Andreae, German theologian (born 1528)
- February 1 – Lawrence Humphrey, English theologian (born c. 1527)
- March – Petru Cercel, Wallachian prince and poet
- July – Guillaume de Salluste Du Bartas, French poet (born 1544)
- September 20 – Robert Garnier, French poet (born 1544)
- November 23 – André Thévet, French cosmographer (born 1502)
- November 29 – Philipp Nicodemus Frischlin, German poet and dramatist (born 1547)
- December 5 – Johann Habermann, German theologian (born 1516)
- probable
  - Lambert Daneau, French theologian (born c. 1535)
  - Giuseppe Leggiadri Gallani, Italian poet and dramatist (born 1516)
