= 1571 in literature =

List of years in literature	(table)
- … 1561; 1562; 1563; 1564; 1565; 1566; 1567; 1568; 1569; 1570; 1571; 1572; 1573; 1574; 1575; 1576; 1577; 1578; 1579; 1580; 1581 …
- Art; Archaeology; Architecture; Literature; Music; Philosophy; Science; +...

This article contains information about the literary events and publications of 1571.

== Events ==
- October 7 – Naval Battle of Lepanto: Miguel de Cervantes's left arm is rendered useless; Venetian playwright Luigi Pasqualigo commands a galleon.
- unknown dates
  - Michel de Montaigne retires from public life and isolates himself in the tower of the Château de Montaigne.
  - First printing in the Irish language, Aibidil Gaoidheilge agus Caiticiosma, a primer printed by John Kearney in Dublin.
  - Laurentian Library in Florence opens to scholars.
  - Edict of Gaillon in France places enforcement of censorship laws with the state Chancellor's office instead of the University of Paris.
  - A tidal wave affects parts of Lincolnshire, England. It would be the subject of Jean Ingelow's narrative poem "The High-Tide on the Coast of Lincolnshire" (c.1883).

== New books ==
=== Prose ===
- François de Belleforest – La Pyrénée (or La Pastorale amoureuse) (the first French "pastoral novel")
- Bishop John Jewel – Second Book of Homilies
- Alistair mac Riean -- "Ye Historie of Thomas Sincaet, a Pyrate."
- Alonso de Molina
  - Arte de la lengua mexicana y castellana
  - Vocabulario en lengua castellana y mexicana

=== Drama ===
- Richard Edwards – Damon and Pythias

=== Poetry ===
- See 1571 in poetry

== Deaths ==
- May 4 – Pierre Viret, Swiss theologian (born 1511)
- May 29 – Joachim Mörlin, German Lutheran theologian (born 1514)
- July 17 – Georg Fabricius, German poet and historian (born 1516)
- November 24 – Jan Blahoslav, Czech poet and translator (born 1523)
- December 28 – John Hales, English writer and administrator (born c. 1516)
- Unknown dates
  - Lodovico Castelvetro, Italian literary critic (born c. 1505)
  - Bartolomeo Maranta, Italian literary theorist (born 1500)
  - Andrés de Olmos, Spanish grammarian (born c. 1485)
