= 1648 in literature =

This article contains information about the literary events and publications of 1648.

== Events ==
- February 11 – Ordinances are passed in England against plays: actors are to be fined and theatres pulled down. This comes six days after the King's Men (playing company) are arrested at the Cockpit Theatre in London during an illegal performance of Rollo Duke of Normandy.
- February – Richard Flecknoe sails from Lisbon to Brazil.
- April 7 – Edward Pococke becomes Professor of Hebrew at the University of Oxford, in succession to Dr Morris.
- April 16 – René Descartes meets Frans Burman, resulting in the Conversation with Burman.
- June 9 – Richard Lovelace, an English Cavalier poet, begins his second imprisonment for opposition to Parliament.
- June – Pierre Gassendi, having given up lecturing at the Collège Royal because of ill-health, returns to his home area of Digne.
- July 14 – During the siege of Colchester, a cannon nicknamed Humpty Dumpty, is blown off the walls, possibly inspiring the nursery rhyme.
- December – King Charles I is imprisoned in Windsor Castle, where he reportedly spends much of his time reading the plays of Shakespeare and Ben Jonson.
- unknown dates
  - Robert Boyle writes Seraphic Love, his first important work. Although it will not be published until 1660, he produces presentation copies for friends.
  - Richard Crashaw, exiled in Paris, publishes two hymns in Latin.
  - King Frederick III of Denmark establishes the Royal Library, Denmark.

== New books ==
=== Prose ===
- Gauthier de Costes, seigneur de la Calprenède – Cléopâtre
- Robert Filmer – Freeholders Grand Inquest touching our Sovereign Lord the King and his Parliament
- Thomas Gage – The English-American, or a New Survey of the West Indies
- Baltasar Gracián – Agudeza y arte de ingenio
- Philippe Labbe
  - Tirocinium Linguæ Græcæ etc.
  - De Byzantinæ historiæ scriptoribus, etc.
- Francisco Martínez de Mata – Memorial a razón de la despoblación y pobreza de España y su remedio
- José García de Salcedo Coronel – Comentarios al Panegírico del Duque de Lerma de Luis de Góngora
- Fray Marcos de Salmerón – El príncipe escondido
- Madeleine de Scudéry – Artamène, ou le Grand Cyrus, volume 1
- John Wilkins – Mathematical Magick
- Gerrard Winstanley – The Mystery of God

=== Drama ===
- Anonymous – Crafty Cromwell
- Anonymous – Kentish Fair, or the Parliament Sold to Their Best Worth
- Anonymous ("Mercurius Melancholicus") – Mistress Parliament Her Gossiping
- Jasper Mayne – The Amorous War

=== Poetry ===
- Christen Aagaard – Threni Hyperborci
- Richard Corbet – Poetica Stromata
- Mildmay Fane, 2nd Earl of Westmorland – Otia Sacra
- Robert Herrick
  - Hesperides
  - Noble Numbers
- Francisco de Borja y Aragón – Obras en verso
- Francisco López de Zárate – La invención de la Cruz
- Francisco de Quevedo (ed. Jusepe Antonio González de Salas) – El Parnaso español, en dos cumbre dividido, con las nueve musas

== Births ==
- February 1 – Elkanah Settle, English poet and dramatist (died 1724)
- November 12 – Juana Inés de la Cruz, Mexican Hieronymite nun, polymath, poet and playwright (died 1695)
- Unknown date – Gaspard Abeille, French poet (died 1718)
- Earliest year – Mihai Iștvanovici, Wallachian typographer and poet (died c. 1720)

== Deaths ==
- February 2 – George Abbot, English writer (born c. 1603)
- February 22 – Wilhelm Lamormaini, Luxembourgish Jesuit theologian (born 1570)
- March 12 – Tirso de Molina, Spanish dramatist (born 1571)
- May 26 – Vincent Voiture, French writer and poet (born 1597)
- May 28 (bur.) – William Percy, English poet and playwright (born 1570/74)
- July 31 – Benedictus van Haeften, Dutch theologian (born 1588)
- August 20 – Edward Herbert, 1st Baron Herbert of Cherbury Anglo-Welsh writer and soldier (born 1574)
- September 1 – Marin Mersenne, French theologian and philosopher (born 1588)
- December 16 – Arthur Duck, English lawyer and author (born 1580)
