= Forsett =

Forsett is a surname. Notable people with the surname include:

- Edward Forsett (1553–1630), English official, politician, and writer
- Justin Forsett (born 1985), American football player
