= 1582 in literature =

List of years in literature	(table)
- … 1572; 1573; 1574; 1575; 1576; 1577; 1578; 1579; 1580; 1581; 1582; 1583; 1584; 1585; 1586; 1587; 1588; 1589; 1590; 1591; 1592 …
- Art; Archaeology; Architecture; Literature; Music; Philosophy; Science; +...

This article presents lists of the literary events and publications in 1582.

== Events ==
- February – Meleager, a Latin play on the mythological figure of Meleager by "Gulielmus Gagerus" (William Gager), is performed by members of Christ Church, Oxford.
- November 29 – Marriage of William Shakespeare, 18 years old, to 26-year-old Anne Hathaway (who is pregnant with their first daughter, Susanna), perhaps at Temple Grafton (and not at Stratford-upon-Avon) in England. It will be a decade before he emerges on the London theatrical scene.
- Publication in England of the first part of Richard Mulcaster's textbook on the teaching of English, the Elementarie, including "a generall table [of eight thousand words] we commonlie use" in regularized spelling.
- Earliest reference to the publishing of private newspapers in Beijing (China).

== New books ==
=== Prose ===
- Robert Bellarmine – Disputationes de Controversiis
- George Buchanan – Rerum Scoticarum Historia
- Balthasar de Beaujoyeulx – Balet comique de la Royne
- "Douay–Rheims Bible", New Testament
- Richard Hakluyt – Divers Voyages Touching the Discoverie of America
- John Leland – A learned and true assertion of the original, life, actes, and death of the most noble, valiant, and renoumed Prince Arthure, King of great Brittaine (posthumous translation)
- Anthony Munday – English Romayne Lyfe (i. e. Life of an Englishman in Rome)

=== Drama ===
- Anonymous – The Rare Triumphs of Love and Fortune
- Miguel de Cervantes – El cerco de Numancia
- William Gager – Meleager
- Giovanni Battista Guarini – Il pastor fido

=== Poetry ===
See 1582 in poetry

== Births ==
- January 6 – Alonso de Contreras, Spanish adventurer and writer (died 1641)
- January 28 – John Barclay, Scottish satirist and poet (died 1621)
- February 6 – Mario Bettinus, Italian philosopher (died 1657)
- April 8 (baptised) – Phineas Fletcher, English poet (died 1650)
- October 17 – Johann Gerhard, German Lutheran theologian (died 1637)
- November 21 – François Maynard, French poet (died 1646)
- Unknown dates
  - Giovanni Francesco Abela, Maltese writer (died 1655)
  - Richard Corbet, English poet and bishop (died 1635)
  - William Lithgow, Scottish traveller and author (died 1645)

== Deaths ==
- January 26 – Thomas Platter, Swiss humanist writer (born 1499)
- July/August – Jacques Pelletier du Mans, French humanist poet (born 1517)
- September 28 – George Buchanan, Scottish historian (born 1506)
- October 4 – Teresa of Ávila, Spanish mystical writer (born 1515)
- Unknown dates
  - Arnoldus Arlenius, Dutch humanist philosopher and poet (born c.1510)
  - Natalis Comes, Italian mythographer, poet and historian (born 1520)
  - Jobus Fincelius, German humanist writer
