= Farsa de Inês Pereira =

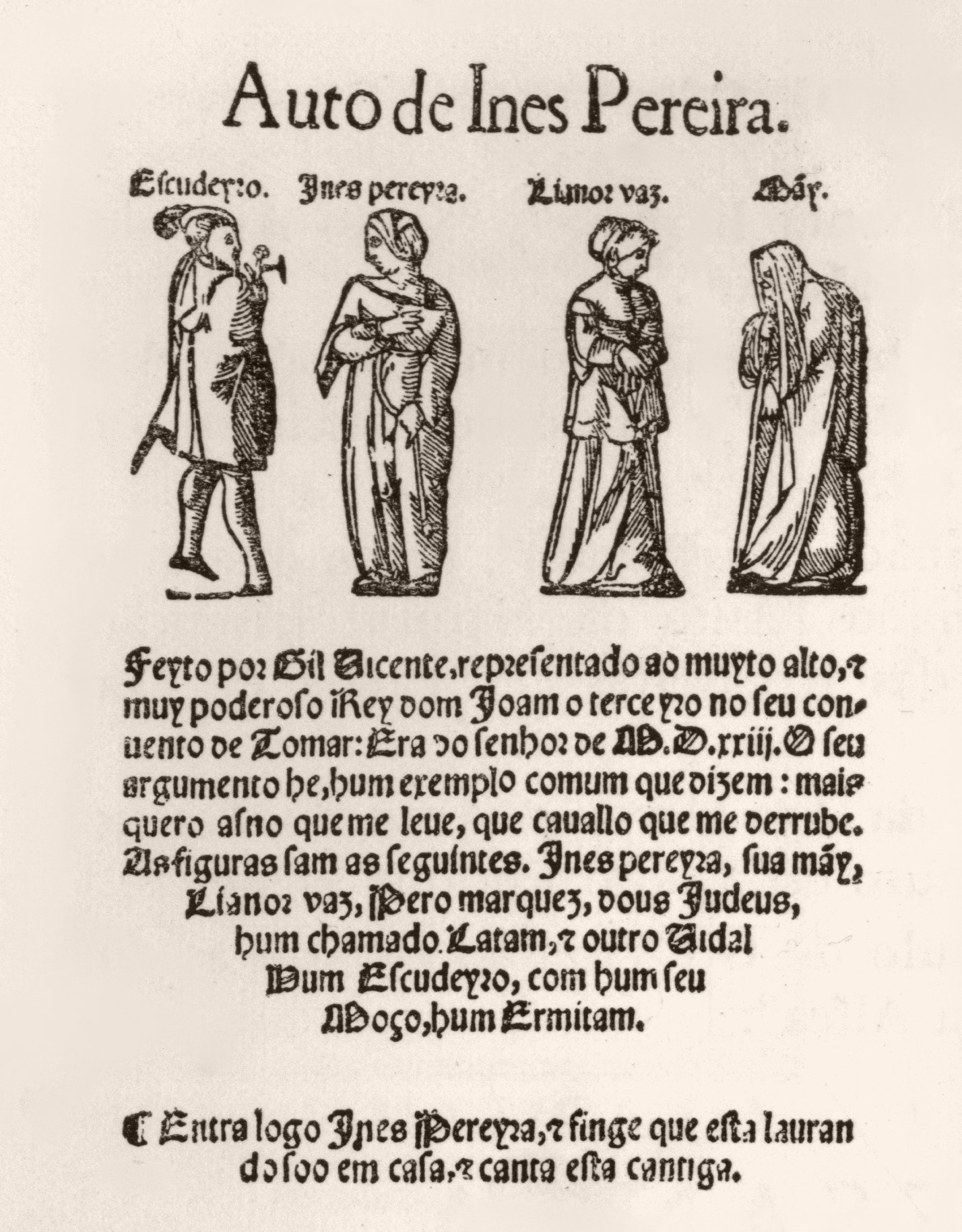
Frontispiece of "Auto de Inês Pereira" by Gil Vicente.

The Farce of Inez Pereira (Portuguese: Farsa de Inês Pereira), originally written as the Allegory or Act of Inez Pereira (Early Portuguese: Auto de Ines Pereira), is a 1523 play by Portuguese playwright Gil Vicente. It shows the ambitions of the Portuguese bourgeoisie in the early 16th century.

The play was written after a challenge against Gil Vicente’s talent. The author agreed to write a play after a Portuguese popular saying: “Mais quero um asno que me carregue do que cavalo que me derrube” (English: “It’s better to have a donkey to carry me than a horse to trample me”). It was first presented to king John III of Portugal at the Convento de Cristo, in Tomar, in 1523.

== Characters ==
- Inês: a frivolous, lazy and greedy woman. Inês is the Portuguese form of the name Agnes or Inez; Pereira is a toponymic name literally referencing pear trees. She marries twice only to get rid of the boredom of being a bachelorette. Not achieving her aims with the first marriage, she finally does in the second, with a naïve husband. Despite her inappropriate behavior, she even manages to gain the sympathy of the audience through her wit.
- Lianor Vaz: a matchmaker.
- Mother: despite giving good education to her daughter, she believes that it is important to secure a good match and becomes Inês accomplice in her plots.
- Pêro Marques: the foolish husband. Despite being ridiculed by Inês, marries her and accepts her contempt and infidelity.
- Brás da Mata: worried about having a wife, fools Inês into believing he is a good man. After the marriage, becomes a tyrant and locks her up.
- Moço: the loyal servant of Brás, who despite not liking his master helps him to woo and lock Inês up.
- Vagrant: an old friend of Inês who became a vagrant and later her lover
- Latão and Vidal: Jewish matchmakers who introduce Inês to Brás.

== Plot ==
The action revolves around the protagonist Inês Pereira, who never leaves the stage that remains the same throughout the play. Inês, is a common lass who aspires to marry up with a clever man. Inês’ mother, worried about her daughter’s future wants her to marry Pero Marques, a suitor brought to her by Lianor Vaz. However, Inês Pereira doesn’t like the idea of marrying the dull and uneducated son of a farmer. Two Jewish matchmakers intervene and Inés marries a squire, Brás da Mata. The marriage soon is revealed to be disastrous for Inês, who shortly afterwards is locked up on her husband’s orders when he goes to war. Months later, Inês receives the good news: her husband was killed by a shepherd. Soon, she sets out to marry again and the very same day discovers that Pero Marques still remains a bachelor – something he had promised her the day they met. Inês marries him right away but soon finds a lover. The saying is represented when her husband carries her on his back to her lover in the final scene. The cuckhold even sings “assim são as coisas” (“Thus the things are”).
