= The World and the Child =

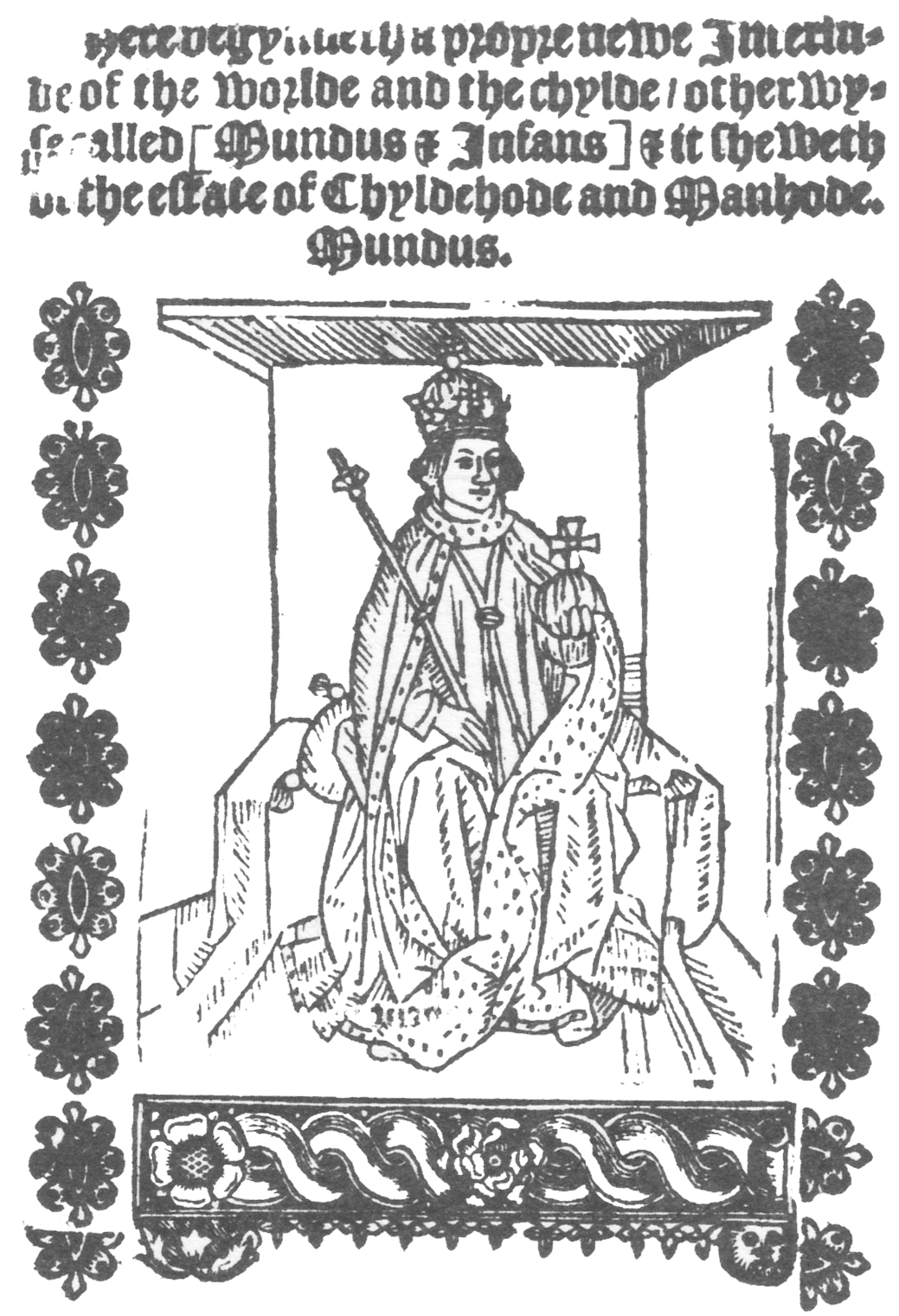
- Frontispiece to the 1522 edition
- Original language: English
- Written by: Unknown
- Characters: Mundus, the world Infans, the child Wanton; Lust and Liking; Manhood; Conscience; Folly; Perseverance; Age
- Genre: Morality play

Premiere
- Date: 1508

The World and the Child (Latin: Mundus et Infans) is an anonymous English morality play. Its source is a late 14th-century or 15th-century poem The Mirror of the Periods of Man's Life, from which the play borrows significantly while reducing the number of characters. It is thought to have influenced William Shakespeare's Henry IV, Part 1.

== Date ==
The earliest surviving edition (printed by Wynkyn de Worde) is dated 17 July 1522, although the play is believed to have been written earlier than that and to have circulated in manuscript form. A bookseller in Oxford records the sale of "mundus a play" in 1520. T. W. Craik suggests a date of 1508 while MacCracken offers sometime in the late 15th century.

== Sources ==
- Craik, Thomas Wallace. 1958. The Tudor Interlude: Stage, Costume and Acting. Leicester: Leicester UP.
- Lester, G. A., ed. 1981. Three Late Medieval Morality Plays. The New Mermaids ser. London: A&C Black. ISBN 0-7136-3272-0.
- MacCracken, Henry Noble. 1908. "A Source of Mundus et Infans." PMLA 23.3: 486–496.
- Southern, Richard. 1973. The Staging of Plays Before Shakespeare. London: Faber. ISBN 0-571-10132-1.
- Wickham, Glynne, ed. 1976. English Moral Interludes. London: Dent. ISBN 0-460-11303-8.
