= Sebastián de Horozco =

Spanish poet and playwright

Sebastián de Horozco (1510–1579/80) was a poet and playwright of the Spanish Golden Age. He was born in Toledo.

== Selected Dramatic Works ==
- Representación de la famosa historia de Ruth.
- Representación de la parábola de San Mateo
- Representación de la historia evangélica del capitulo nono de San Juan
- Coloquio de la muerte con todas las edades y estados
- Un Entremés que hizo el author a ruego de una monja parienta suya evangelista
