= Francisco López de Zárate =

- Born: c. 1580
- Occupations: Playwright; Poet; Writer
- Writing career
- Period: 1619-1651

Francisco López de Zárate (1580–1658) was a Spanish poet, playwright and writer.

== Life ==
Zárate was born in 1580 to Rodrigo López de Zárate. He had three sisters.

== Works ==
- Several poems (Varias poesías), 1619.
- Heroic poem of the invention of the Cross ( Poema heroico de la invención de la Cruz)
- Several works, Alcala, 1651
- Hercules and Oeta furente, Senecan tragedy (Hércules Furente y Oeta, tragedia senequista).
- The galley reinforced comedy (La galeota reforzada, comedia).
- Works, edited by José Simón Díaz Madrid: National Research Council, 1947, 2 vols.
