= Discourse on Reforming the Government of Florence =

1520 work by Niccolò Machiavelli

The Discourse on Reforming the Government of Florence (Italian: Discorso sopra il riformare lo stato di Firenze) is a 1520 work by Italian Renaissance political scientist and writer Niccolò Machiavelli.
