= George Bate =

George Bate (1608–1668) was an English court physician.

Bate graduated with an M.D. from St Edmund Hall, Oxford in 1637. Three years later he treated Charles I in Oxford. He was physician to Oliver Cromwell and his family, physician to Charles II, and one of the founding Fellows of the Royal Society. He published several medical and political articles and books including two volumes of Elenchus Motuum Nuperorum in Anglia.

== Works ==
- Pharmacopoeia Bateana: Or Bate's Dispensatory . Smith & Walford, London Translated from the second Edition of the Latin Copy, published by Mr. James Shipton / By William Salmon 1694 Digital edition by the University and State Library Düsseldorf
- Pharmacopoeia Bateana, seu Pharmaca e Praxi Georgii Batei, Regis Angliae Medici primarii, excerpta : cum Viribus & Dosibus annexis; Nec non Arcana Goddardiana; & Orthotonia Medicorum Observata; Jacobi Le Mortii Chymia vindicata, & comparata, Philosophia medica, atque Theoria Hominis, & Morborum. J. G. Hertz, Venetiis 1703 Digital edition / 1731 Digital edition by the University and State Library Düsseldorf
