= Alonso de Andrade =

Spanish biographer and ascetic writer (1590–1672)

Alonso de Andrade (1590 – 20 June 1672) was a biographer and ascetic writer.

== Biography ==
Andrade was born in Toledo, Spain. Before entering the Society of Jesus (1612) he read philosophy in Toledo, was afterwards rector of Plasencia and minister in foreign countries. He died in Madrid in 1672.

== Works ==
Andrade is best known for continuing Nieremberg's Varones Ilustres, biographies of distinguished members of the Society of Jesus.

In his declining years, he wrote some thirty-four volumes on different subjects, including Guia de la Virtud e Imitacion de Nuestra Senora. The 1913 Catholic Encyclopedia praises his style and orthodoxy, but considers him careless and overly simple.
