= Jobus Fincelius =

Job (Jobus, Iobus) Fincelius (died 1582) was a 16th-century humanist and physician. Born Hiob Fincel (or Finzel), he studied at Erfurt, Jena, and Wittenberg before becoming a master of philosophy at Wittenberg (1549). In 1562, he was professor and assistant of medicine at Weimar. In 1568, he was a physician at Zwickau.

His De miraculis sui temporis (1556) (Latin "Concerning the Wonders of his Times"; in German Warhafftige beschreybung und gründlich verzeichnuß schröcklicher Wunderzeichen und Geschichten) contains the oldest printed tale of the Hameln Pied Piper. It was printed in Frankfurt in 1556. Fincelius identified the Pied Piper with the Devil.

In Book XI. of his De mirabilibus, Fincelius also touches on the myth of the werewolf and relates the story of a farmer of Pavia, who, as a wolf, fell upon many men in the open country and tore them to pieces.
