= Hans Wilhelm Kirchhof =

Hans Wilhelm Kirchhof (sometimes Kirchhoff, c. 1525 – c. 1602) was a German Landsknecht, Baroque poet and translator. He left a rich and versatile collection of works. The Ausläufer collections contain sixteen works. His printed and handwritten works number more than sixty.

== Selected literary works ==
- Wendunmut, auch Wendunmuth (1563)
- 5 Gelegenhetsschriften traurige und freudige Ereignisse aus dem Leben der hessischen Landgrafenfamilie (1564)
- Militaris Disciplina (1602)
- Schatztruhen
- Kommentarien des Geschichtsschreibers Philipp von Commines
- Hessisches Bühnenspiel vom Bauernkriege (1570)

=== Online editions ===
- Kirchhof, Hans Wilhelm: Wendunmuth. Darinnen fünff und fünnfzig höflicher, züchtiger ... vollständig digitalisierte Ausgabe (1565) des Wendunmuth der Österreichischen Nationalbibliothek
- Works by Hans Wilhelm Kirchhof at Projekt Gutenberg-DE (in German) (aus Wendunmut: Ein reicher Bauer heiratet zum Adel und andere Schwänke)

== Sources ==
- Hermann Oesterley: Kirchhof, Hans Wilhelm. In: Allgemeine Deutsche Biographie (ADB), p.8. Band 16, Duncker & Humblot, Leipzig 1882 (online version)
- Bodo Gotzkowsky: Kirchhof, Hans Wilhelm. In: Neue Deutsche Biographie (NDB), pp.645 f. Band 11, Duncker & Humblot, Berlin 1977 ISBN 3428001923 (online version)
