= Dominicus Arumaeus =

Dutch jurist (1579–1637)

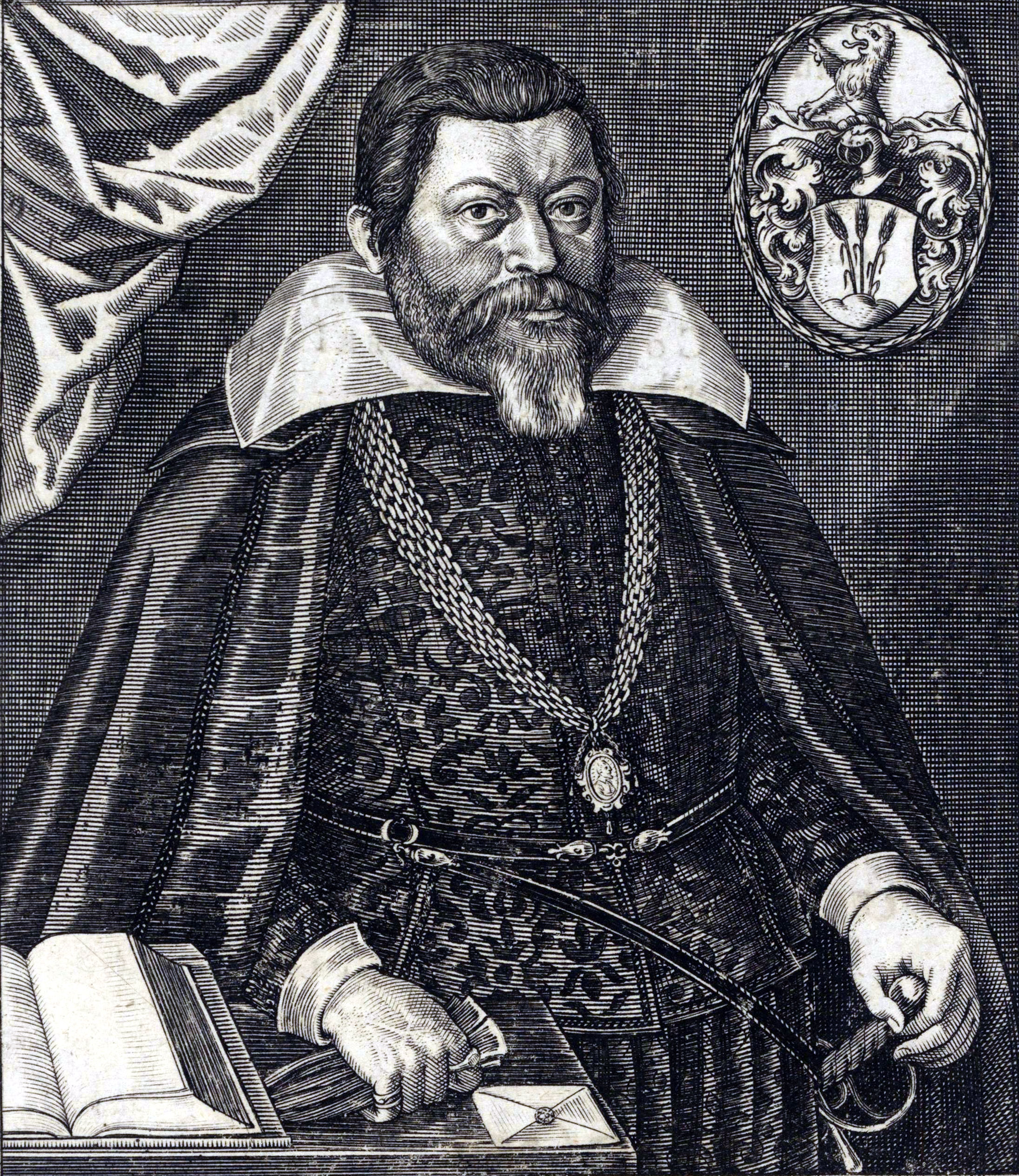
Domenicus Arumaeus.jpg

Dominicus Arumaeus (1579, Leeuwarden – February 24, 1637, Jena) was a Dutch jurist.

Born Douwe van Arum in Friesland, he studied law in Franeker (as early as 1593), Oxford, Rostock and finally Jena, where he married Anna Pingitzer on March 31, 1600. He remained there as a professor, rector and councillor at Weimar and was buried in Jena on Feb 27 1637.

In his five-volume Discursus academici de iure publico (1615–1623), Arumaeus pioneered public law as a distinct field of study. Influenced by Dutch humanism, his methodical analysis of the constitutional law of the Holy Roman Empire focused no longer on Roman law but on Imperial sources of public law, such as Imperial basic laws and electoral capitulations.

== Works ==
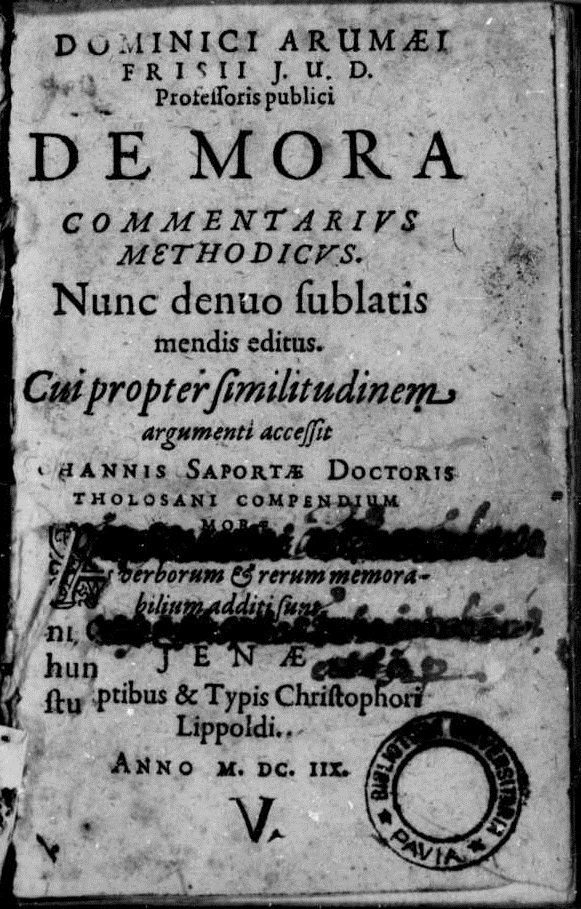
De mora commentarius methodicus, 1608

- Tractatus methodicus de mora Jena 1603, 1608.
  - De mora commentarius methodicus (in Latin). Jena: Christoph Lippoldt. 1608.
- Exercitationes Iustiniani ad Institutiones juris Jena 1607.
- Decisionum et Sententiam Jena 1608, 1612.
- Disputationes ad praecipuas Pandectarum et Codicis leges, consuetudines feudales, quatuor Institionum libros Jena 1613, 1620, 1628.
- Discursus academici de iure publico Jena 1616–1623, 5 volumi. Volume 1.
- Discursus academici ad Auream Bullam Caroli Quarti Romanorum Imperatoris etc. Jena 1617, 1619, 1663.
- Commentarius Jiuridico-historico-politicus de comitiis Romano-Germanici Imperii Jena 1630, 1660.
