= Francisco de Araujo =

Spanish Catholic theologian (1580–1664)

Francisco de Araujo O.P. (1580 – 19 March 1664) was a Spanish Catholic theologian.

== Biography ==
Francisco de Araujo was born at Verin, Galicia, Spain. In 1601, he entered the Dominican Order at Salamanca. He taught theology (1616–17) in the convent of St. Paul at Burgos, and in the latter year was made assistant to Peter of Herrera, the principal professor of theology at Salamanca. Six years later he succeeded to the chair, and held it until 1648, when he was appointed Bishop of Segovia. In 1656 he resigned his Episcopal see, and retired to the convent of his order at Madrid, where he died.

== Works ==
- Commentaria in universam Aristotelis metaphysicam, Commentary on the Metaphysics of Aristotle (Two vols: 1° Salamanca, 1617; 2°, ibid., 1631);
- Opuscula tripartita, h.e. in tres controversias triplicis theologiae divisa etc. (Douay, 1633);
- A commentary in seven volumes on the Summa of St. Thomas Aquinas (Salamanca and Madrid, 1635–47);
- Variae et selectae decisiones morales ad stat. eccles. et civil. pertinentes (Lyons, 1664; 2d ed., Cologne, 1745).
- In the second volume of his commentary on Aquinas' "Prima Secundae" there is a treatise on Predestination and Grace, the doctrine of which is Molinistic. Martinez de Prado has proved that this was not written by Araujo, who, in a later work, shows clearly his adherence to the Thomistic teaching on those questions.
