= Wigand Wirt =

German theologian

Wigand Wirt (1460—June 30, 1519) born at Frankfurt, was a German theologian best known for his polemic writings attacking the Catholic doctrine of the immaculate Conception. In 1506, the Archbishop of Mainz forbade the reading of certain of Wirt's works, and in 1512, the Vatican officially decided against him. He was elected as prior of a convent in Stuttgart in 1506, and was a prior in Steyer at the time of his death.
