= De Heptarchia Mystica =

Book by John Dee

John Dee's heptarchic lamen in Enochian (left) and English (right)

De Heptarchia Mystica, or On the Mystical Rule of the Seven Planets, is a book written in 1582–83 by English alchemist John Dee. It is a guidebook for summoning angels under the guidance of the angel Uriel and contains diagrams and formulae.

== See also ==
- De Occulta Philosophia
- Heptameron
