= 1637 in literature =

This article contains information about the literary events and publications of 1637.

== Events ==
- January – Pierre Corneille's tragicomedy Le Cid first performed at the Théâtre du Marais in Paris. Based on Guillén de Castro's play Las mocedades del Cid (1618), it is first published later in the year and sparks the debate of the Querelle du Cid at the Académie française over its failure to observe all the classical unities of drama and supposed lack of moral purpose, but proves popular with audiences.
- January 24 – Hamlet is performed before King Charles I and Queen Henrietta Maria at Hampton Court Palace.
- July 10 – Thomas Browne is registered as a physician, following which he settles in Norwich.
- August 30 – The King's Men mount a production for the English Court of William Cartwright's The Royal Slave at Christ Church, Oxford. The company is paid an extra £30 "for their pains in studying and acting" the drama.
- October 2 – The London theatres re-open, having been closed almost continuously since May 1636 because of a severe outbreak of bubonic plague.
- December 11 – John Lilburne is arrested following his return from the Netherlands to England for printing and circulating Puritan books (particularly William Prynne's News from Ipswich) not licensed by the Stationers' Company.
- unknown date – Willem Blaeu sets up Europe's largest printing house in Amsterdam, specializing in cartography.

== New books ==
- María de Zayas – Novelas amorosas y ejemplares
- René Descartes – Discours de la méthode pour bien conduire sa raison, et chercher la vérité dans les sciences
- Thomas Heywood – Pleasant Dialogues and Dramas
- Alonso de Castillo Solórzano – Aventuras del bachiller Trapaza
- Baltasar Gracián – El héroe
- María de Zayas y Sotomayor – Novelas amorosas y ejemplares. Honesto y entretenido sarao
- Marin Mersenne – Traité de l'harmonie universelle
- Song Yingxing (宋應星) – Tiangong Kaiwu(天工開物, Exploitation of the Works of Nature)
- René Descartes – La Géométrie

== New drama ==
- Pedro Calderón de la Barca
  - A secreto agravio, secreta venganza
  - El mayor monstruo del mundo
  - El médico de su honra
  - El Tetrarca published
- Georgios Chortatzis (probably posthumously) – Erofili published
- Pierre Corneille – Le Cid
- Isaac de Benserade
  - La Mort d’Achille et la Dispute de ses armes
  - Gustaphe ou l’Heureuse Ambition
  - Iphis et Iante
- John Fletcher and Philip Massinger – The Elder Brother published
- François Tristan l'Hermite – Penthée
- Thomas Heywood – The Royal King and the Loyal Subject published
- John Milton – Comus (masque) published
- Thomas Nabbes – Microcosmus, a Moral Masque
- Thomas Neale – The Warde
- Joseph Rutter – The Cid, Part 1 published
- James Shirley – five plays published in five single-play quartos: The Example, The Gamester, Hyde Park, The Lady of Pleasure and The Young Admiral
- Sir John Suckling – Aglaura
- Joost van den Vondel – Gijsbrecht van Aemstel written
- George Wilde – The Converted Robber

== Poetry ==
- William Alexander, 1st Earl of Stirling – Recreations of the Muses
- James Day – A New Spring of Divine Poetry
- Thomas Jordan – Poetical Varieties
- Shackerley Marmion – Cupid and Psyche, a 2000-line translation and adaptation of The Golden Ass of Apuleius
- Gabriel Bocángel – La lira de las musas
- Miguel Dicastillo – Aula de Dios
- Lope de Vega – La vega del Parnaso
- Jorge Pinto de Morales – Maravillas del Parnaso y flor de los mejores romances graves, burlescos y satíricos

== Births ==
- December 24 – Pierre Jurieu, French theologian (died 1713)
- December 27 – Petar Kanavelić, Croatian poet and songwriter (died 1719)
- December 30 – William Cave, English theologian (died 1713)
- Unknown date
  - Agnes Campbell, Scottish printer (died 1716)
  - Zeb-un-Nisa, Sufi poet (died 1702)
- Probable year of birth – Robert Ferguson, Scottish pamphleteer (died 1714)

== Deaths ==
- February 9 – Philemon Holland, English translator and schoolmaster (born 1552)
- February 24 – Dominicus Arumaeus, Dutch legal writer (born 1579)
- February – Gervase Markham, English poet (born c. 1568)
- March 19 – Péter Pázmány, Hungarian philosopher and cardinal (born 1570)
- May 19 – Isaac Beeckman, Dutch philosopher and diarist (born 1588)
- August 6 – Ben Jonson, English poet and dramatist (born c. 1572)
- August 10
  - Johann Gerhard, German theologian (born 1582)
  - Edward King, Anglo-Irish poet (drowned in shipwreck, born 1612)
- October 5 – Daniel Cramer, German theologian and dramatist (born 1568)
