= Edward Forsett =

English writer

Edward Forset (or Forsett) (1553–1630) was an English official, politician and writer, known for political works and as a playwright.

== Life ==
He was the fourth son of Richard Forsett, a barrister and Member of Parliament, and his wife Margaret Vaughan. Educated at Christ's College, Cambridge and Trinity College, Cambridge, he graduated B.A. in 1572, and was a Fellow of Trinity from 1574 to 1581.

In the service of Robert Cecil, 1st Earl of Salisbury, and a justice of the peace, Forset was involved on the prosecution side of the 1605 Gunpowder Plot. In 1606 he became Member of Parliament for Wells.

== Works ==
Forset wrote:

- Pedantius (1581) (online text), a Latin comedy. It made fun of Gabriel Harvey.
- A Comparative Discourse of the Bodies Natural and Politique (1606), contributing to the traditional monarchist theory of the king's two bodies: the body politic and the body natural. This is considered one important source for later divine right and royalist ideas, as well as spinning out the bodily metaphor (the King as the heart).
- A Defence of the Right of Kings. Wherein the power of the papacie over princes, is refuted; and the Oath of Allegiance justified (1624), a belated reply to writings of Robert Parsons, belonged to the allegiance oath controversy.
