= Wilhelm Lamormaini =

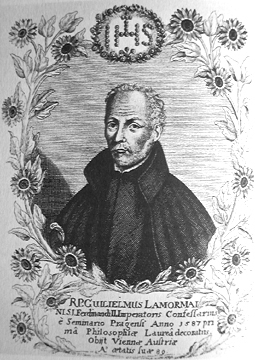
Wilhelm Lamormaini, 16th-century engraving

Wilhelm Germain Lamormaini (29 December 1570 – 22 February 1648) was a Jesuit theologian, and an influential figure as confessor of the Habsburg emperor Ferdinand II during the Thirty Years' War.

== Life ==
Lamormaini was born near Dochamps in the Duchy of Luxembourg (nowadays part of Manhay in the Belgian Luxembourg province), since 1482 part of the Habsburg Netherlands. His father, Everard Germain, was a farmer at the hamlet of Lamormenil, hence the name. Lamormaini studied first at the Jesuit gymnasium of Trier, and thence went to Prague, where he received his doctor's degree, and in 1590 entered the Jesuit Order in Brno. Ordained priest at Bratislava in 1596 and afterwards working as a teacher in Žilina and Prague, he was called to the Jesuit University of Graz in Styria as professor of philosophy in 1600, became professor of theology in 1606, and in 1614 was appointed rector of the college. His strong Catholic manners attracted Archduke Ferdinand II of Inner Austria, then residing at Graz Castle.

Between the years 1621 and 1623 he stayed in Rome, but became in the latter year rector of the Jesuit college merged with the University of Vienna, and in 1637 rector of the academic college. From 1643 to 1645 he was provincial of the Austrian province of the Jesuit order, but was compelled to relinquish this office on account of his gout, which made his visitations a task of the greatest difficulty. During the last years of his life, he established a seminary for poor students in Vienna, the Ignatius- und Franciskus-Seminarium für Stipendisten.

== Father Confessor ==
After the death of his fellow Jesuit Martin Becan in 1624, he became the confessor of Ferdinand II, and as such his name appears in the political affairs of the time. As counselor of the emperor, his enemies affirmed that it was not Ferdinand, but the Jesuits who ruled the empire. He was an intransigent proponent of the Counter-Reformation, and when the Protestant princes of the Empire were compelled by the 1629 Edict of Restitution to give up all former ecclesiastical property seized from the Catholic Church, Lamormaini was influential in having it used for the propagation of the Catholic faith. However, these measures met with opposition even by the Catholic estates and ultimately enfeebled the Imperial authority.

Having unsuccessfully tried to restrain Ferdinand from antagonizing the French by interfering in the War of the Mantuan Succession, Lamormaini was placed in an unpleasant position when the Spaniards accused him of espousing the cause of their enemies, and tried to have him banished from court. But Lamormaini was able to vindicate himself. His concerns became real, when the French Cardinal Richelieu abandoned the common Catholic cause and had the Treaty of Bärwalde signed with the Swedish Empire in 1631. Lamormaini also took part in the proceedings against the emperor's removed generalissimo Albrecht von Wallenstein in January 1634.

Lamormaini's rise ended with the emperor's death in 1637. He was offered a large sum by the Senate of Hamburg in recognition of his services on the occasion of the election of Ferdinand III as King of the Romans. The city of Augsburg, in gratitude for the services he had rendered to it, erected a costly altar in the church of the Viennese Novitiate. He died at Vienna.

By his advice many Jesuit institutions were established in the empire. He took a leading part in the Counter-Reformation in the Habsburg lands of Austria, Styria, Bohemia, and Moravia.

== Works ==
Only a part of the biography of Ferdinand II upon which Lamormaini labored appeared, "Ferdinand II, Romanorum Imperatoris, Virtutes" (1638); this was republished frequently, and in different languages.
