= Andria (Machiavelli) =

Italian translation by Niccolò Machiavelli of a play by Terence

Andria is the first play written by Niccolò Machiavelli, published in the period 1517–1520. It is a translation of a play written by the Latin comedy writer Terence, who had originally taken it from the Greek dramatist Menander. It is one of the examples of Machiavelli as a comedy writer, along with The Mandrake and the Clizia.

== Story ==
The story is about an old man, Simone, who wants his son, Panfilo, to marry Filumena, the daughter of his neighbour Cremete. Panfilo has, however, a secret love affair with Glicerio, a girl who is thought to be the sister of Criside, and who is pregnant by him. At Criside's funeral the old Simone gets to know about this secret. Suspecting Panfilo's love for Glicerio, Cremete breaks off the marriage contract.

Simone doesn't want to let Panfilo know, in order to test Panfilo's loyalty. The young boy doesn't want to forsake Glicerio, but pretends to go along with the wedding. Meanwhile, Cremete changes his mind and proceeds to renew the marriage contract. But then it comes to the old Critone, a friend of the deceased Criside, who recognizes Glicerio as Pasibula. Pasibula was Cremete's daughter, who was thought to have died in a shipwreck during a travel to the island of Andros. In the end there are two weddings: Panfilo marries Glicerio, and Carino, a friend of his, marries Filumena.

== Production history ==
The Andria remained untranslated for the English stage until a limited run of Michael Knowles' translation, The Girl from Andros, was produced at Yale University in April 2012. At the time of production, Machiavelli scholar Angela Capodivacca observed: "The new translation and performance of the Andria is hopefully going to open new ways of inquiry and thinking about the relationship between Machiavelli and translation, Machiavelli and theatre, and, last but not least, Machiavelli's understanding of the phenomenology of the political sphere. This production is a watershed event for the English-speaking world".
