= Hernando de Acuña =

Spanish poet and translator

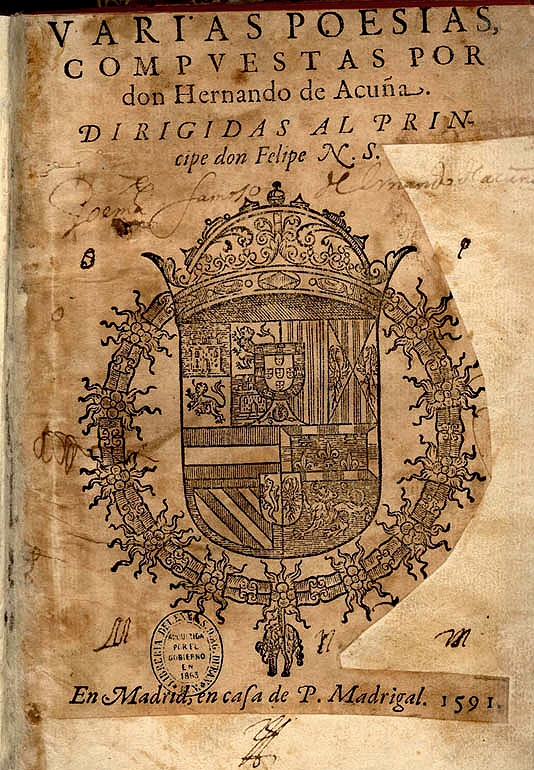
Hernando de Acuña's poems

Hernando de Acuña (c. 1520 – 22 June 1580), a native of Valladolid, was a Spanish poet and translator of the Spanish Golden Age. He was admired by Emperor Charles V for both his military and literary talents.

== Life ==
Of noble birth, he devoted his youth to arms and fought as a soldier in Italy under the command of Alfonso d'Avalos in the War of Piedmont between the French and the Holy Roman Empire. He also served in Germany. During this period he wrote verses to two ladies known as "Silvia" and "Galatea". Captured by the French, he was released by the emperor Charles, who appointed him governor of Querasco. In 1557 he participated in the Battle of St. Quentin.

About 1560 he abandoned his military career and moved back to Spain, marrying a cousin named Juana de Zúñiga. He settled in Granada, where he and Diego Hurtado de Mendoza became the most famous of local poets. He died at Granada in 1580.

== Literary works ==
Hernando de Acuña represents the first generation of Petrachian poets in Spain. He is best known for sonnets, eclogues and elegies. Several works were dedicated to Charles V, including the well-known sonnet "Ya se acerca, señor, o ya es llegada", which sums up Charles' political creed as "Un monarca, un imperio y una espada". As a pastoral poet he excelled.

His translation of le Chevalier délibéré, the well-known chivalric romance by Olivier de la Marche, under the title of El Cavallero Determinado, was much esteemed by the emperor; so indeed were his translations from Ovid and Juan Boscán Almogáver, and his Poesías varias.

Other poems were published by his widow in 1591. His contemporary Lewes Lewknor translated works by him into English.

== See also ==
· · ·
