= Privileged presses =

UK publishers with royal printing privileges

In the United Kingdom, the privileged presses are Cambridge University Press and Oxford University Press. They are called this because, under letters patent issued by the Crown defining their charters, only they have the right to print and publish the Book of Common Prayer and the Authorised Version of the Bible in England, Wales and Northern Ireland. The Cambridge University Press charter from 1534 gives it the right to print "all manner of books", and Oxford University Press received a similar right when it was chartered in 1636. In addition both presses, by virtue of a separate set of letters patent, hold the explicit right to print the Authorised Version.
