= 1649 in literature =

This article contains information about the literary events and publications of 1649.

== Events ==
- January 1 – Local authorities raid the four remaining London theatres – the Salisbury Court, the Red Bull, the Cockpit and the Fortune – to suppress clandestine play-acting. The actors found are arrested – except for the members of the Red Bull company, who manage to escape.
- February 9 – Eikon Basilike: the Pourtrature of His Sacred Majestie in His Solitudes and Sufferings, purporting to be the spiritual autobiography of King Charles I of England, is published ten days after his execution and becomes a popular success. John Gauden later claims to have written it.
- March 24 – The authorities damage the Cockpit Theatre to inhibit continued attempts to use it for plays. (The building is not destroyed, however, and in 1660 it is fixed and used again, when drama resumes after the Restoration.)
- April 23 – William Everard, a Digger, issues "The Declaration and Standard of the Levellers of England."
- October – John Milton's Eikonoklastes: in Answer to a Book Intitl'd Eikon Basilike, a defence of the execution of Charles I, is published.
- With the London theatres closed since 1642, the trend toward closet drama (often highly politicized) continues – and is accentuated by the January 30 execution of Charles I. In the play Newmarket Fair, Oliver Cromwell and other Parliamentary leaders commit suicide when they learn of the accession of Charles II, an event that actually still lies eleven years in the future.
- Antoine Girard's poem Rome Ridicule starts a fashion for burlesque poetry.
- Sir William Davenant is appointed treasurer of the colony of Virginia.

== New books ==
=== Prose ===
- George Bate – Elenchus Motuum Nuperorum in Anglia, or, A short historical account of the rise and progress of the late troubles in England. First part published and read by Pepys (13 February 1662/63)
- Nicholas Culpeper – A Physicall Directory, or, A Translation of the London Dispensatory
- René Descartes – Les passions de l'âme (Passions of the Soul)
- John Donne – Fifty Sermons
- John Gauden (attributed) – Eikon Basilike: The Portraicture of His Sacred Majestie in His Solitudes and Sufferings
- John Lilburne
  - England's New Chains Discovered
  - Legal Fundamental Liberties
- John Milton
  - Eikonoklastes (a reply to Eikon Basilike)
  - The Tenure of Kings and Magistrates
- Francisco Pacheco – Arte de la pintura (The Art of Painting)
- William Prynne – A Legal Vindication of the Liberties of England against all Illegal Taxes and Pretended Acts of Parliament
- Alexander Ross – The Alcoran of Mahomet. First English translation, from the 1647 French of André du Ryer
- "Salmasius" (Claude de Saumaise) – Defensio Regia
- Jeremy Taylor – Apology for authorized and set forms of Liturgy against the Pretence of the Spirit
- Edward Winslow – The Danger of Tolerating Levelers in a Civil State

=== Drama ===
- Anonymous
  - A Bartholomew Fairing
  - The Disease of the House, or the State Mountebank Administering Physic to a Sick Parliament
  - The Famous Tragedy of Charles II, Basely Butchered
  - Newmarket Fair, or A Parliament Outcry
- Anonymous ("T. B.") – The Rebellion of Naples, or the Tragedy of Massenello
- William Cavendish, Duke of Newcastle
  - The Country Captain
  - The Variety
- Sir William Davenant – Love and Honour
- Francis Quarles – The Virgin Widow
- William Peaps – Love in Its Ecstasy, or the Large Prerogative
- Vavasor Powell - God the Father glorified
- Christopher Wase – The Electra of Sophocles

=== Poetry ===
- Antoine Girard de Saint-Amant – Rome Ridicule
- Richard Lovelace – Lucasta: Epodes, Odes, Sonnets, Songs, &c., to which is added Aramantha, A Pastoral
- Francisco de Trillo y Figueroa – Al himeneo del señor D. Francisco de Vergara
- Lachrymae Musarum: The Tears of the Muses
- Monumentum Regale, a Tombe for Charles I

== Births ==
- March 3 – Sir John Floyer, English medical writer and physician (died 1734)
- June 13 – Adrien Baillet, French critic and biographer (died 1706
- September 27 – Jonas Danilssønn Ramus, Norwegian historian (died 1718)
- Unknown date – Samuel Johnson, English political writer (died 1703)

== Deaths ==
- March 19 – Gerhard Johann Vossius, Dutch classicist and theologian (born 1577)
- June 3 – Manuel de Faria e Sousa, Portuguese historian and poet (born 1590)
- June 20 – Maria Tesselschade Visscher, Dutch poet (born 1594)
- August 25 – Richard Crashaw, English poet (born c. 1613)
- October 3 – Giovanni Diodati, Swiss-born Italian theologian (born 1576)
- November 19 – Caspar Schoppe, German critic (born 1576)
- December 4 – William Drummond of Hawthornden, Scottish poet (born 1585)
- Autumn – Alexander Leighton, Scottish pamphleteer and physician (born c. 1570)
