= 1515 in literature =

This article contains information about the literary events and publications of 1515.

== Events ==
- Christoph Froschauer becomes the first printer in Zürich.

== New books ==
=== Prose ===
- Andrea Alciato - Annotationes in tres libros Codicis
- Martin of Arles – Tractatus de superstitionibus, contra maleficia seu sortilegia quae hodie vigent in orbe terrarum

=== Drama ===
- c. 1514–15 – Gian Giorgio Trissino – Sophonisba

=== Poetry ===
- Alexander Barclay (translated from Baptista Mantuanus) – Saint George
- John of Capistrano – Capystranus (published in London)
- Approximate year – Stephen Hawes – The Comforte of Lovers

== Births ==
- March 28 – Teresa of Ávila, Spanish Carmelite mystic, saint and poet (died 1582)
- Unknown dates
  - Nicolas Denisot, French poet and painter (died 1559)
  - Brne Karnarutić, Croatian poet and writer (died 1573)
  - Ambrosius Lobwasser, Saxon humanist, translator and psalmist (died 1585)
  - Johann Weyer, Dutch occultist (died 1588)
- probable
  - Roger Ascham, English scholar (died 1568)
  - William Baldwin, English writer, editor and theatrical director (died c. 1563)

== Deaths ==
- February 16 – Aldus Manutius, Italian printer-publisher and poet (born 1449)
- unknown date Jacques Almain, French theologian (year of birth unknown)
