= 1585 in literature =

This article contains information about the literary events and publications of 1585.

== Events ==
- February 2 – Hamnet and Judith, twin children of William Shakespeare and his wife Anne, are baptised at Stratford-upon-Avon.
- March 3 – The Teatro Olimpico, Vicenza, designed by Andrea Palladio, and completed by Vincenzo Scamozzi, opens with a production of Sophocles' Oedipus Rex), using trompe-l'œil scenery in one-point perspective.
- December 13 – The blind poet, playwright and actor Luigi Groto dies in Venice, having just come from the theatre, where he has played the role of the blind Oedipus Rex.
- At the order of the Inquisition, a collection of verses ("canczuni") in Italian and Maltese published by Maltese Dominican friar Pasquale Vassallo in 1584 is burned for its allegedly 'obscene' content.

== New books ==
=== Prose ===
- John Calvin – The Commentaries... upon the Actes of the Apostles, Faithfully translated out of Latine into English for the great profite of our countrie-men, by Christopher Fetherstone, student in divinitie
- Miguel de Cervantes – La Galatea
- Juan González de Mendoza - Historia de las cosas más notables, ritos y costumbres del gran reyno de la China
- Christian Wurstisen - Germaniae historicorum illustrium, quorum plerique ab Henrico IIII Imperatore usque ad annum Christi, MDCCCC ... res gestas memoriae consecrarunt, tomus unus [-pars altera], Volume 1

=== Drama ===
- Nicolas de Montreux – Athlette
- Richard Tarlton (attributed) – The Seven Deadly Sins

=== Poetry ===
See 1585 in poetry

- Thomas Watson – Amyntas (pastoral epic in Latin)

== Births ==
- January 6 – Claude Favre de Vaugelas, French grammarian (died 1650)
- January 31 – Daniel Schwenter, German Orientalist, polymath, poet and librarian (died 1636)
- March 16 – Gerbrand Bredero, Dutch poet and playwright (died 1618)
- June 24 – Johannes Lippius, German Protestant theologian, philosopher, and theorist of music (died 1612)
- October 11 – Johann Heermann, German poet (died 1647)
- December 4 – John Cotton, English-born American theologian and minister (died 1652)
- December 13 – William Drummond of Hawthornden, Scottish poet (died 1649)

Uncertain dates

- Elizabeth Cary, Lady Falkland, née Elizabeth Tanfield, English poet, translator and dramatist (died 1639)
- Diego Jiménez de Enciso, Spanish dramatist (died 1634)

== Deaths ==
- January – Anthony Gilby, English Puritan and Bible translator (born c. 1510)
- February 6 – Edmund Plowden, English lawyer and theorist (born 1518)
- February 13 – Alfonso Salmeron, Spanish Jesuit Biblical commentator (born 1515)
- March 10 – Rembert Dodoens, Flemish botanist (born 1517)
- June 4 – Muretus, French humanist poet and writer in Latin (born 1526)
- June 20 – Christian Kruik van Adrichem, Dutch Catholic theologian (born 1533)
- July 30 – Christian Schesaus, German humanist poet (born 1535)
- September 1 – Alexander Arbuthnot, Scottish printer (year of birth unknown)
- September 18 – Molanus, Flemish theologian of the Counter Reformation (born 1533)
- December 8 – Piero Vettori, Italian humanist philologist and writer (born 1499)
- December 27 – Pierre de Ronsard, French poet (born 1524)
