= 1572 in literature =

This article contains information about the literary events and publications of 1572.

== Events ==
- January 3 – James Burbage, on behalf of Leicester's Men, writes to their patron, Robert Dudley, 1st Earl of Leicester, requesting that they be given the special status of "household servants".
- unknown dates
  - Vagabonds Act in England prescribes punishment for rogues. This includes actors' companies lacking formal patronage.
  - George Gascoigne becomes a "soldier of fortune" in the Low Countries.

== New books ==
- Remy Belleau – La Bergerie (2nd edition)
- Rafael Bombelli – L'Algebra
- John Field – A View of Popish Abuses yet remaining in the English Church
- Libro d'Oro of Corfu
- Bishops' Bible (revised version)

== New drama ==
- Jean de la Taille – Saül le furieux

== Poetry ==
- Luís de Camões – Os Lusiadas
- Fernando de Herrera – Canción por la Victoria del Señor don Juan
- Thomas Palfreyman – Divine Meditations

== Births ==
- January 7 – Antoine de Gaudier, French Jesuit theologian (died 1622)
- January 22 (earliest possible date) – John Donne, English poet and Dean of St Paul's (died 1631)
- June 11 (approximate) – Ben Jonson, English Renaissance dramatist, poet and actor (died 1637)
- July 25 – Theodorus Schrevelius, Dutch Golden Age poet (died 1649)

Unknown date – James Mabbe, English scholar, poet and translator (died 1642)

== Deaths ==
- March 27 – Girolamo Maggi, Italian poet and polymath (born c. 1523)
- April 12 – Jean Crespin, French martyrologist and printer (born c. 1520)
- June 28 – Johannes Goropius Becanus, Dutch humanist writer and linguist (born 1519)
- September 23 – Henry Scrimgeour, Scottish diplomat and book collector (born 1505)
- September – Denis Lambin, French classicist (born 1520)
