= 1576 in literature =

The following literary events and publications occurred in the year 1576.

== Events ==
- December – James Burbage opens The Theatre, the second permanent public playhouse in London (and the first to have a substantial life – 22 years), ushering in the great age of Elizabethan drama.
- unknown dates
  - The composer Richard Farrant opens the first Blackfriars Theatre in London, presenting plays performed by the Children of the Chapel.
  - The composer Thomas Whythorne writes a Booke of songs and sonetts with longe discourses sett with them [sic], an early example of autobiographical writing in English.

== New books ==
=== Prose ===
- Antonio Agustín y Albanell - Antiquae Collectionis Decretalium
- Jean Bodin – Les Six livres de la République (The Six Books of the Republic)
- Ulpian Fulwell – Ars adulandi, or, The Art of Flattery (dialogues)
- Étienne de La Boétie (died 1563) – Discourse on Voluntary Servitude (Discours de la servitude volontaire, published as Le Contr'un)
- George Pettie – A Petite Palace of Pettie His Pleasure
- Peter Martyr Vermigli (died 1562; edited by Robert le Maçon) – Loci Communes
- George Whetstone – The Rocke of Regard

=== Drama ===
- Luigi Pasqualigo – Il Fedele
- George Wapull – The Tide Tarrieth No Man published

=== Poetry ===
- See 1576 in poetry
- Tulsidas – Ramcharitmanas
- The Paradise of Dainty Devices, the most popular of the Elizabethan verse miscellanies

== Births ==
- January 12 – Petrus Scriverius, Dutch historian (died 1660)
- May 27 – Caspar Schoppe, German controversialist (died 1649)
- June 6 – Giovanni Diodati, Bible translator (died 1649)
- October – John Marston, English dramatist and poet (died 1634)
- October 30 – Enrico Caterino Davila, Italian historian (died 1631)
- unknown dates
  - William Ames, English philosopher (died 1633)
  - Johann Bogermann, Dutch translator (died 1637)
  - Samuel Collins, theologian (died 1651)
  - Charles Fitzgeoffrey, Elizabethan poet (died 1638)
  - Goldastus, Swiss Calvinist historian (died 1635)
  - John Weever, English poet and antiquary (died 1632)

== Deaths ==
- January 19 – Hans Sachs, German poet and dramatist (born 1494)
- February 10 – Wilhelm Xylander, German classical scholar (born 1532)
- March 18 – Johann Stössel, German Lutheran theologian (born 1524; died in prison)
- May 2 – Bartolomé Carranza, Spanish theologian (born 1503)
- June 30 – Franciscus Sonnius, Flemish theologian (born 1506)
- October 14 – Konrad Heresbach, Calvinist writer (born 1496)
- unknown dates
  - Basil Faber, German theologian (born 1520)
  - Aloysius Lilius, Italian philosopher (born c. 1510)
  - Lancelot Ridley, English theologian
  - Mavro Vetranović, Croatian Benedictine poet and author (born 1482)
