= 1514 in literature =

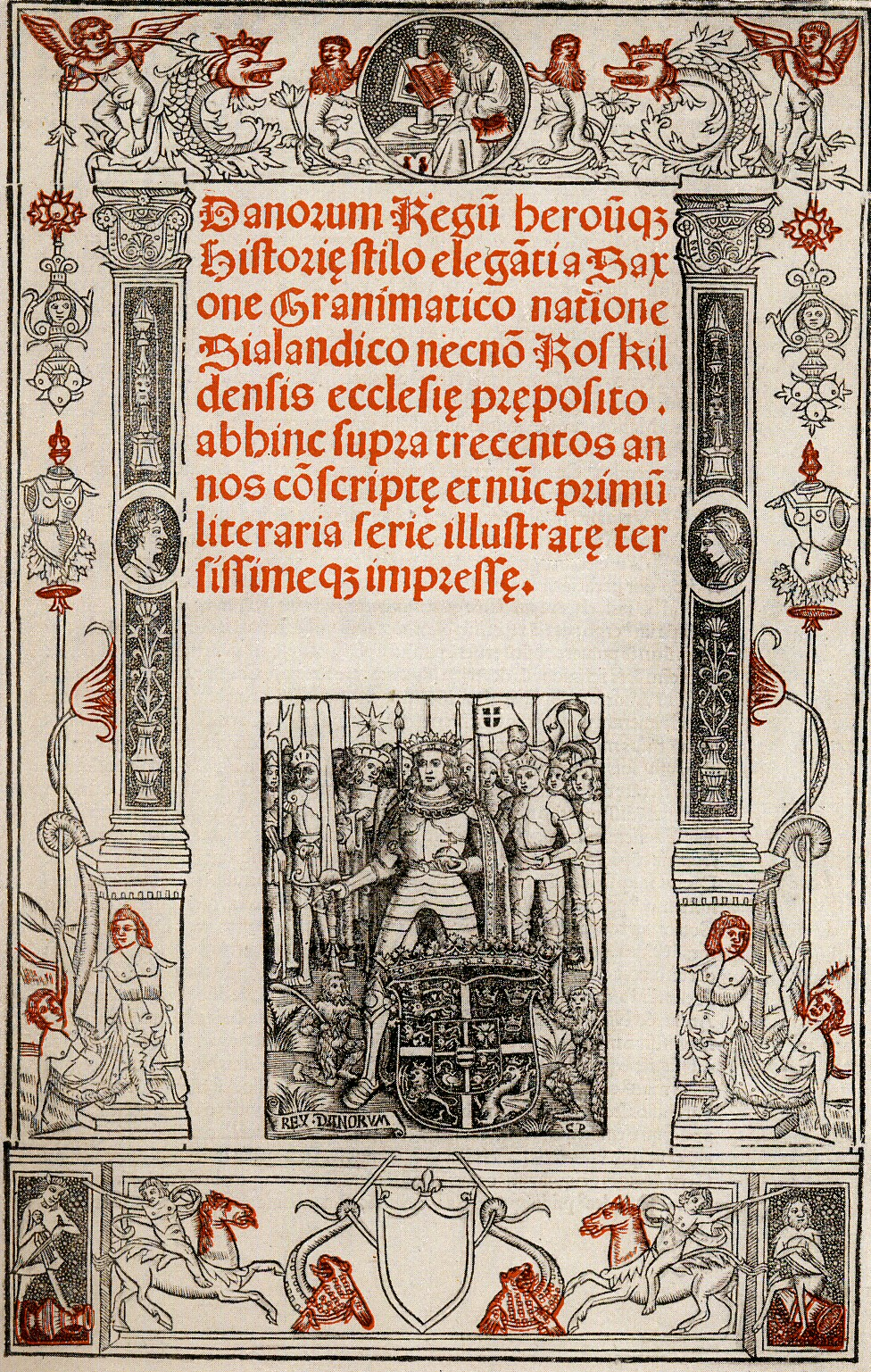
Front page of Christiern Pedersen's Danorum Regum heroumque Historia, Paris 1514 (see Gesta Danorum).

This article contains information about the literary events and publications of 1514.

== Events ==
- May 15 – The earliest printed edition of Saxo Grammaticus' 12th-century Scandinavian history Gesta Danorum, edited by Christiern Pedersen from an original found near Lund, is published as Danorum Regum heroumque Historiae by Jodocus Badius in Paris.
- unknown dates
  - Gregorio de Gregorii begins printing Kitab Salat al-Sawa'i (a Christian book of hours), the first known book printed in the Arabic alphabet using movable type, in Venice, falsely assigned to Fano.
  - Clément Marot presents his poem Judgment of Minos to Francis I of France and begins styling himself facteur de la reine ("queen's poet") to Queen Claude.

== New books ==
=== Prose ===
- Desiderius Erasmus (attributed) – Julius Excluded from Heaven (Julius exclusus de caelis)

== Births ==
- February 8 – Daniele Barbaro, Italian humanist polymath, writer and translator (died 1570)
- November 29 – Andreas Musculus, German theologian (died 1581)
- unknown date – Al-Akhdari, Arabic poet (died 1546)

== Deaths ==
- October 7 – Bernardo Rucellai, Florentine historian (born 1448)
- November 28 - Hartmann Schedel, German humanist historian and cartographer (born 1440)
- unknown dates
  - Peter Crockaert, Flemish philosopher
  - Nicolaus Ragvaldi, Swedish monk and translator
