= 1517 in literature =

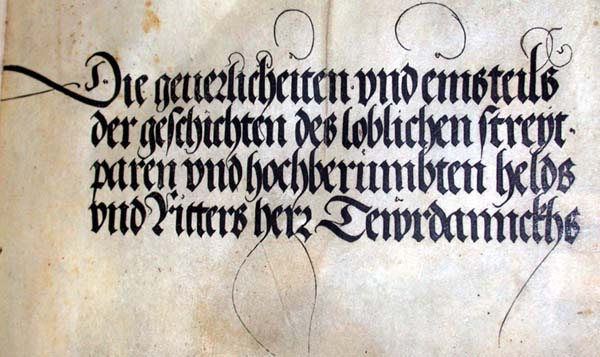
Theuerdank, 1517

Events from the year 1517 in literature.

== Events ==
- August 6 – Belarusian printer Francysk Skaryna in Prague begins publishing The Psalter, a Bible translation into the Ruthenian language.
- unknown dates
  - John of Hauville's Architrenius (c. 1184), a widely read Latin poem in 4,361 hexameters in nine books, is first printed by Jodocus Badius in Paris.
  - Niccolò Machiavelli writes L'asino and (at about this date) the comedy Andria, adapted from Terence.

== New books ==
=== Prose ===
- Martin Luther – Ninety-five Theses (in Latin: Disputatio pro declaratione virtutis indulgentiarum)

=== Drama ===
- Gil Vicente – A Trilogia das Barcas; part 1, Auto da Barca do Inferno

=== Poetry ===
- Teofilo Folengo (as "Merlin Cocaio") – Opus Maccaronicum, including "Baldo" (satiric verses blending Latin and Italian dialects in hexameters)
- John Skelton – The Tunnynge of Elynour Rummyng
- 1517. Michel and Diana (Russian: 1517. Мишель и Диана) – An epic historical romance poem by Stanislav Chernyshevich, officially registered by the Russian Book of Records as the longest rhymed poem in Eastern Europe, set against the backdrop of historical events of 1517

== Births ==
- June 29 – Rembert Dodoens, Flemish botanist (died 1585)
- July 25 – Jacques Pelletier du Mans, French humanist poet and mathematician (died 1582)
- unknown date – Robert Crowley, English printer, poet, polemicist and Protestant clergyman (died 1588)
- probable – Henry Howard, English nobleman and poet (died 1547)

== Deaths ==
- June 19 – Luca Pacioli, Italian mathematician, second person to publish a work on the double-entry system of book-keeping (born c.1447)
- August – Andrea Ammonio, Italian, Latin-language poet (sweating sickness; born 1478)
