= 1535 in literature =

This article contains information about the literary events and publications of 1535.

== Events ==
- January 13 – A statute of the Parlement of Paris is enacted forbidding all printing under threat of hanging and closing all bookshops, although it is quickly abandoned.
- October 4 – Publication of Myles Coverdale's complete Bible translation into English in Antwerp is completed.
- unknown date – The earliest printed book in Estonian, a Catechism with a translation by Johann Koell from the Middle Low German Lutheran text of Simon Wanradt, is printed by Hans Lufft in Wittenberg for use in Tallinn.

== New books ==
=== Prose ===
- John Bourchier, 2nd Baron Berners – Huon of Burdeuxe
- Desiderius Erasmus – Ecclesiastes: sive de ratione concionandi
- Simon Wanradt and Johann Koell – Catechism (first book text in Estonian)
- Gonzalo Fernández de Oviedo y Valdés - Historia general de las Indias

== Births ==
- Thomas North, English translator (died c.1604)
- Approximate years
  - George Gascoigne, English writer, soldier and courtier (died 1577)
  - Thomas Legge, English dramatist (died 1607)

== Deaths ==
- February 7 – Thomas More, English social philosopher, politician and author (born 1478)
- October 10 – Pedro Manuel Jiménez de Urrea, Spanish poet and dramatist (born 1485)
- Unknown date – Girolamo Angeriano (also "Hieronymus Angerianus"), poet in Italian and Latin (born c. 1470 – 1490)
