= 1566 in literature =

This article contains information about the literary events and publications of 1566.

== Events ==
- September 2 – The stage collapses during a performance of Richard Edwardes' play Palamon and Arcite at Oxford, in the presence of Queen Elizabeth I of England. Three deaths are caused. The show goes on and "the Queen laughed heartily thereat."
- Ordonnance of Moulins in France prohibits writing, printing or selling of defamatory books and requires all books published to carry a seal of state approval.

== New books ==
=== Prose ===
- Historia Caroli Magni (12th century forged chronicle – first printing, at Frankfurt)
- Magdeburg Centuries, volume IX
- François de Belleforest (translated from Matteo Bandello) – Histoires tragiques begins publication)
- Diego de Landa – Relación de las cosas de Yucatán
- William Painter – Palace of Pleasure
- The Flower Triod (Триод Цветни)

=== Drama ===
- George Gascoigne – Supposes (translation into English prose from Ludovico Ariosto's I suppositi, for performance by gentlemen of Gray's Inn in London)
  - (with Francis Kinwelmersh) – Jocasta (translation from Lodovico Dolce's Giocasta, a version of Euripides' The Phoenician Women, for performance by gentlemen of Gray's Inn)
- Gismund of Salerne (written and produced for Queen Elizabeth I of England by the gentlemen of Inner Temple in London)

=== Poetry ===
- See 1566 in poetry

== Births ==
- September 1 – Edward Alleyn, English actor (died 1626)
- Unknown date – John Hoskins, English poet (died 1638)

== Deaths ==
- January 6 – Jan Utenhove, Flemish translator (born 1516)
- March – António de Gouveia, Portuguese legal writer and humanist (born c. 1505)
- April 25 – Louise Labé, French poet (born c. 1524)
- July 13 – Thomas Hoby, English translator (born 1530)
- October 10 – Hentenius, Flemish biblical commentator (born 1499)
- October 31 – Richard Edwardes, English poet and dramatist (born 1525)
- unknown date – Alexius Pedemontanus, Italian physician and alchemist, author of a "book of secrets" (born c. 1500)
