= 1520s in music =

- 1510s
- 1520s in music
- 1530s

Music timeline

The decade of the 1520s in music (years 1520–1529) involved some significant events, compositions, publications, births, and deaths.

== Events ==
- 7–24 June 1520: Field of the Cloth of Gold held at Balinghem. The court musical establishments of Francis I of France and Henry VIII of England were led by Jean Mouton and William Cornysh, respectively.
- 1521: Diet of Worms. The composer Ludwig Senfl is present.
- 1526: Kungliga Hovkapellet is first recorded from this year.

== Publications ==
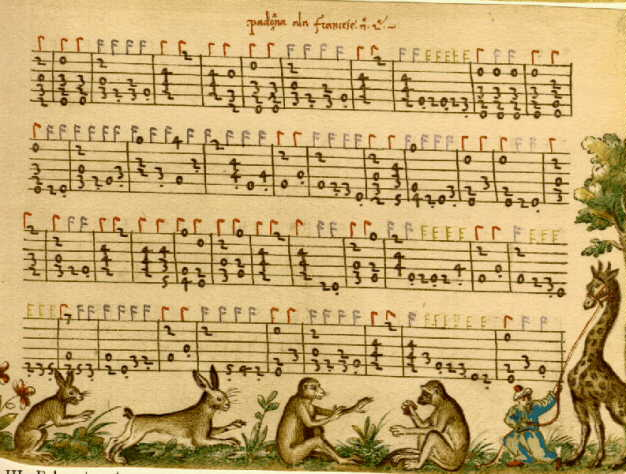
Folio 47r from the Capirola Lutebook: Padoana alla Francese

- 1520:
  - The manuscript Capirola Lutebook is compiled from the works of Vincenzo Capirola
  - Bernardo Pisano, Musica di messer Bernardo Pisano sopra le canzone del Petrarcha, the first printed collection of secular music by a single composer, published by Ottaviano Petrucci in Fossombrone.
  - The Liber selectarum cantionum is printed in Augsburg in the print-shop of Sigmund Grimm and Markus Wirsung. The music is compiled by Ludwig Senfl who includes compositions of his own like his riddle canon Salve sancta parens.
- 1523: Pietro Aron – Thoscanello de la musica, including the first description of quarter-comma meantone, published in Venice.
- 1528:
  - Pierre Attaingnant (ed.) – Chansons nouvelles en musique à quatre parties, the first French music publication made using single-impression movable type, published in Paris.
  - Clément Janequin – Chansons (Paris: Pierre Attaingant)
- 1529: Martin Agricola – Musica instrumentalis deudsch, a description of the musical instruments common in Germany at the time.

== Classical music ==
- 1524: Gasparo Alberti – Missa de Sancto Roccho, for six voices
- 1525: My Lady Carey's Dompe is written for harpsichord by an unknown composer.

== Births ==
=== 1520 ===
- Andrea Amati, Italian violin maker, who stands as the first of the Cremona school (d. c.1578)
- Christoph Fischer or Vischer (c.1518/1520), hymnist (died 1598)
- Vincenzo Galilei (c.1520), lutenist who also composed other music (died 1591)

=== 1521 ===
- Philippe de Monte, Flemish composer of Italian madrigals (died 1603)

=== 1525 ===
- March 4 – Giovanni Pierluigi da Palestrina, Roman composer, primarily of sacred music (died 1594)
- March 25 – Richard Edwardes, English choral musician, playwright and poet (died 1566)

=== 1528 ===
- October 4 – Francisco Guerrero, Spanish composer (died 1599)
- date unknown – Thomas Whythorne, English composer (died 1595)

=== 1529 ===
- probable – Jacobus Vaet, Franco-Flemish composer (died 1567)

== Deaths ==
- 1521:
  - August 27 – Josquin des Prez, Franco-Flemish composer (born c.1450–1455)
  - October 24 – Robert Fayrfax, English Renaissance composer (born 1464)
- 1522: October 30 – Jean Mouton, French composer (born c.1459)
- 1523: October – William Cornysh, English composer (born 1465)
- 1524: July 31 – Sebastiano Festa, Italian composer (born c.1490)
- 1525: probable – Arnolt Schlick, German organist and composer (born c.1460)
- 1526: date unknown – Thomas Stoltzer, German composer (born c,1480)
- 1527: June 9 – Heinrich Finck, German composer (born c.1444)
- 1528: April 1 – Francisco de Peñalosa, Spanish composer (born 1470)
