= 1580 in literature =

This article contains information about the literary events and publications of 1580.

== Events ==
- March – Thomas Legge's Latin play about Richard III of England, Richardus Tertius, the first known history play performed in England, is acted by students at St John's College, Cambridge.
- July 12 – The Ostrog Bible, the first complete printed Bible translation into a Slavic language (Old Church Slavonic), is first printed at Ostroh in the Polish–Lithuanian Commonwealth (modern-day Ukraine) by Ivan Fyodorov.

== New books ==
- Book of Concord
- Jean Bodin – De la demonomanie des sorciers
- Arthur Faunt - Assertiones Theologicæ de Christi in terris Ecclesia
- Veronica Franco – Lettere familiari a diversi
- Robert Greene – Mamillia
- John Lyly – Euphues and his England
- Michel de Montaigne – Essais
- Anthony Munday – Zelauto
- Christian Wurstisen - Bassler Chronick, dariñ alles, was sich in Oberen Teutschë Landen, nicht nur in der Statt und Bistumbe Basel, von ihrem Ursprung her, ... biss in das gegenwirtige MDLXXX. Jar, gedenckwirdigs zugetragen: sonder auch der Eydtgnoschafft, Burgund, Elsass und Breissgow ... warhafftig beschrieben: sampt vieler Herrschafften und Geschlechtern Wapen und Stambäumen, etc. (Eine Missive Enee Sylvii ... darinn die Statt Basel kurtzlich beschrieben. Durch C. Wurstisen ... vertolmetscht.)..

== New drama ==
- Robert Garnier – Antigone
- Thomas Legge – Richardus Tertius

== Poetry ==
- Luís Vaz de Camões – Luís Vaz de Camões
- Jan Kochanowski – Laments (Treny)

== Births ==
- March 5 – Christophe Justel, French scholar (died 1649)
- April 18 (date of baptism) – Thomas Middleton, English poet and dramatist (died 1627)
- June 9 – Daniel Heinsius, Dutch scholar (died 1655)
- September 17 – Francisco de Quevedo, Spanish Golden Age writer (died 1645)
- October 12 – Hortensio Félix Paravicino, Spanish poet (died 1633)
- unknown dates
  - Charles François d'Abra de Raconis, French theologian (died 1646)
  - Manuel de Almeida, Spanish historian (died 1646)
  - Francisco de Araujo, Spanish theologian (died 1664)
  - Philipp Clüver, German historian (died 1623)
  - Ling Mengchu (凌濛初), Chinese vernacular writer (died 1644)
  - Francisco Rodrigues Lobo, Portuguese poet (died 1621)
  - Francisco de Lugo, Spanish theologian (died 1652)

== Deaths ==
- May 3 – Thomas Tusser, English poet (born 1524)
- June 10 – Luís de Camões, Portuguese poet (born c.1524)
- June 22 – Hernando de Acuña, Spanish translator (born c.1520)
- August 20 – Jeronymo Osorio, Portuguese historian (born 1506)
- October 8 – Hieronymus Wolf, German historian (born 1516)
- November 3 – Jeronimo Zurita y Castro, Spanish historian (born 1512)
- unknown dates
  - Sebastián de Horozco, Spanish poet and dramatist (born 1510)
  - Robert Lindsay of Pitscottie, Scottish chronicler (born c.1532)
- probable – Raphael Holinshed, chronicler
