= 1588 in literature =

This article presents lists of the literary events and publications in 1588.

== Events ==
- January 1 – The Children of Paul's perform at the court of Queen Elizabeth I of England, probably acting John Lyly's Gallathea.
- February 2 – The Children of Paul's return to the English court, probably with Lyly's Endymion.
- February 28 – The gentlemen of Gray's Inn perform Thomas Hughes' play The Misfortunes of Arthur before Queen Elizabeth I of England, at Greenwich Palace.
- May–December – Lope de Vega serves in the Spanish Armada, where he begins writing his epic poem La Hermosura de Angélica.
- November – Marprelate Controversy: The first tract by "Martin Marprelate", known as the Epistle, appears at Molesey in England.
- Venice's Biblioteca Marciana is completed by Vincenzo Scamozzi on the Piazza San Marco after more than a century of construction following a plan by the late Jacopo Sansovino.
- John Dee finishes Libri mysteriorum I-XVIII (Spiritual Diaries).
- Welsh author Morris Kyffin publishes the first translation into English of a comedy by Terence, Andria, in London. It is possibly the first printed English text to include an ellipsis (...) as a mark of omission.
- Agostino Ramelli publishes Le diverse et artificiose Machine del Capitano Agostino Ramelli, Dal Ponte Della Tresia Ingegniero del Christianissimo Re di Francia et di Pollonia in Paris, including a design for a bookwheel to permit consultation of multiple volumes.
- 1588–1589 – Earliest probable date for the composition and first performance of Christopher Marlowe's The Tragicall History of the Life and Death of Doctor Faustus in London.

== New books ==
=== Prose ===
- William Allen – An Admonition to the nobility and people of England
- Caesar Baronius and Odorico Raynaldi - Annales Ecclesiastici (first edition)
- John Dee – De heptarchia mystica
- Robert Greene – Pandosto: The Triumph of Time
- Thomas Hariot – A Briefe and True Report of the New Found Land of Virginia
- Martin Marprelate (pseudonym) - An Epistle to the Terrible Priests of the Convocation House
- Thomas Nashe – The Anatomie of Absurditie
- William Rankins – The English Ape
- Welsh Bible (translation by William Morgan)

=== Drama ===
- Thomas Hughes – The Misfortunes of Arthur
- George Peele – The Battle of Alcazar (first performed)

=== Poetry ===
- Felipe Fernandez-Armesto – Two Prayers and a Sailor's Lilt Aboard the Spanish Armada
- Heinrich Meibom – Parodiarum horatianarum libri III et sylvarum libri II
- Jean de Sponde – Essai de quelques poèmes chrétiens

== Births ==
- April 5 – Thomas Hobbes, English philosopher (died 1679)
- April 15 – Claudius Salmasius (Claude Saumaise), French classicist (died 1653)
- June 11 (probably) – George Wither, English poet and pamphleteer (died 1667)
- September 8 – Marin Mersenne, French theologian and philosopher (died 1648)
- October 16 – Luke Wadding, Irish Franciscan annalist (died 1657)
- Unknown dates
  - Leonard Digges (writer), English poet and Hispanist (died 1635)
  - Francis Higginson, English-born New England writer (died 1630)
  - Johannes Maccovius (Jan Makovszki), Polish theologian (died 1644)

== Deaths ==
- February 24 – Johann Weyer, Dutch demonologist (born c. 1515)
- March 29 – Christian Wurstisen, Swiss theologian and historian (born 1544)
- September 3 – Richard Tarlton, English actor (born 1530)
- October 2 – Bernardino Telesio, Italian philosopher (born 1509)
- November 1 – Jean Daurat, French poet (born 1508)
- Unknown date – Sperone Speroni, Italian scholar and dramatist (born 1500)
