= 1534 in literature =

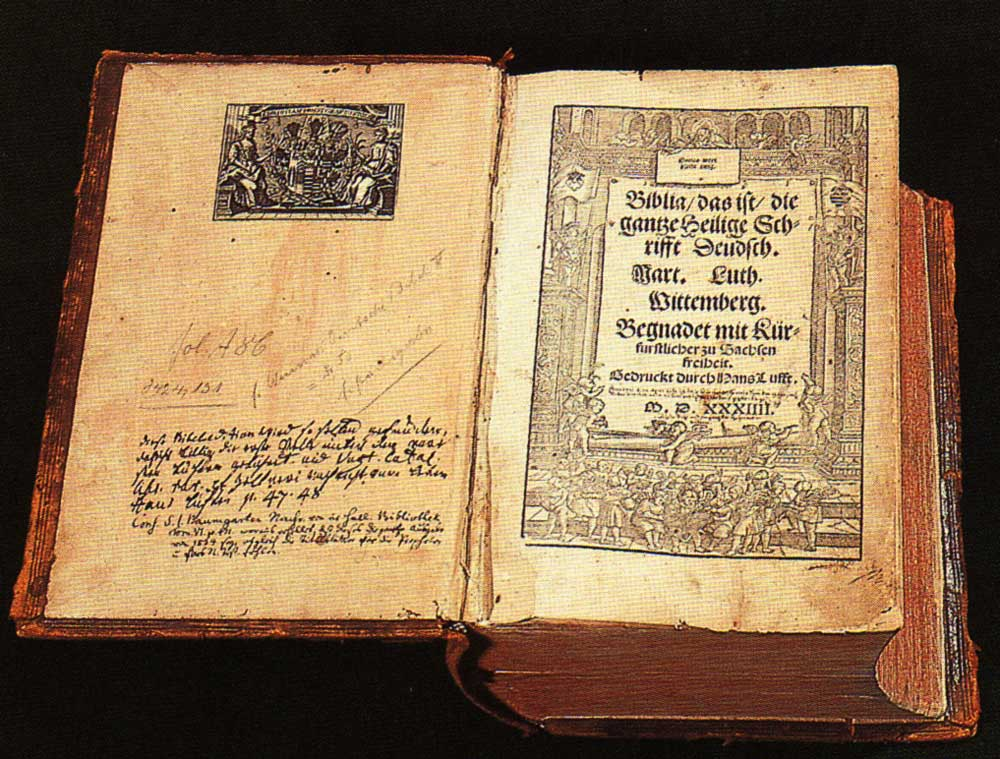
Luther Bible, 1534

This article contains information about the literary events and publications of 1534.

== Events ==
- July 20 – Cambridge University Press is granted a royal charter by King Henry VIII of England to print "all manner of books" and becomes the first of the privileged presses.
- unknown dates
  - Luther Bible: Martin Luther's Biblia: das ist die gantze Heilige Schrifft Deudsch, a translation of the complete Bible into German is printed by Hans Lufft in Wittenberg, including woodcut illustrations.
  - Rabbi Asher Anchel's Mirkevet ha-Mishneh (a Tanakh concordance) becomes the first book printed in Yiddish (in Kraków).

== New books ==
- Anthony Fitzherbert – La Novelle Natura Brevium
- François Rabelais (as Alcofribas Nasier) – Gargantua (La vie très horrifique du grand Gargantua, père de Pantagruel)
- Polydore Vergil – Historia Anglica
- Juan Luis Vives – De conscribendis epistolis
- Syed Shah Israil – Maʿdan al-Fawāʾid in Persian

== Births ==
- April 18 – William Harrison, clergyman and writer (died 1593)
- October 18 – Jean Passerat, poet and satirist (died 1602)

== Deaths ==
- November 23 – Otto Brunfels, German botanist and theologian (born 1488)
- Unknown dates
  - Cesare Magni, Italian printer
  - Wynkyn de Worde, Lotharingian-born English printer
