= 1518 in literature =

This article presents lists of the literary events and publications in 1518.

== Events ==
unknown dates

- Baptista Mantuanus' Eclogues are prescribed for use in St Paul's School, London.
- Niccolò Machiavelli probably writes his satirical comedy The Mandrake (La Mandragola).

== New books ==
=== Prose ===
- Henry Cornelius Agrippa – De originali peccato
- Erasmus – Colloquies
- Frederyke of Jennen
- Tantrakhyan (Nepal Bhasa literature)

=== Drama ===
- Angelo Beolco ('Ruzzante') – La Pastoral (approximate date)

=== Poetry ===
- Thomas More – Epigrammata
- probable
  - Alexander Barclay – The fyfte Eglog
  - Cock Laurel's Boat

== Births ==
- February 7 – Johann Funck, German theologian (died 1566)
- August – Conrad Lycosthenes, né Wolffhart, Alsatian humanist and encyclopedist (died 1561)
- unknown date – Edmund Plowden, English legal writer (died 1585)

== Deaths ==
- February 25 – Publio Fausto Andrelini, Italian humanist poet (born c.1462)
- unknown date – Kabir, Indian mystic poet and saint (born 1398 or 1440 at the latest)
