= 1523 in literature =

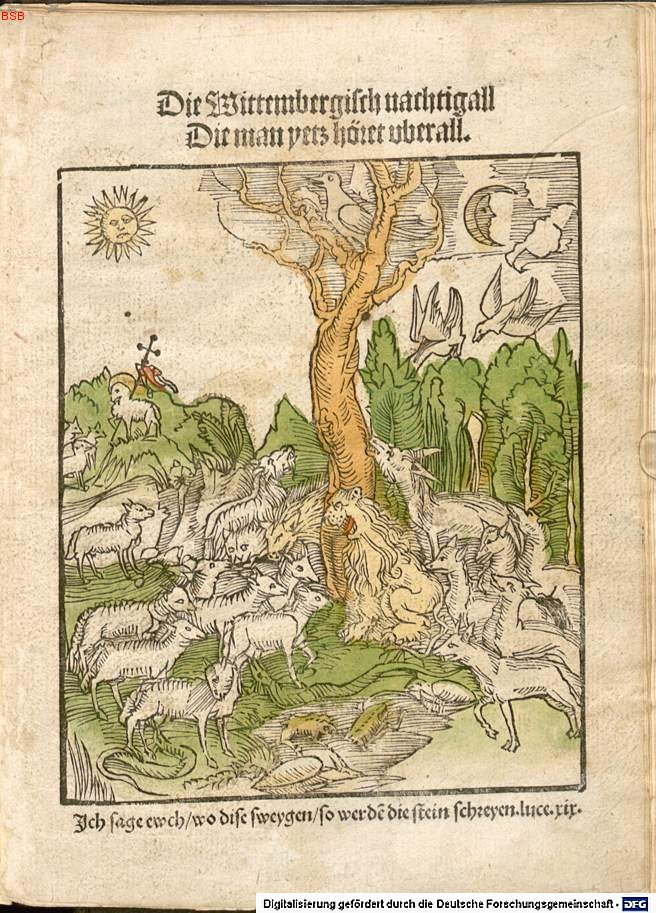
Page from Die Wittenbergische Nachtigall (The Wittenberg Nightingale) by Hans Sachs

This article contains information about the literary events and publications of 1523.

== Events ==
- June 9 – Simon de Colines, a Paris printer, is fined for printing Commentarii initiatorii in quatuor Evangelia, a Biblical commentary by Jacques Lefèvre d'Étaples, without approval from the Paris Faculty of Theology.
- Laurentian Library in Florence commissioned from Michelangelo by the Medici Pope Clement VII.

== New books ==
- Pietro Aron – Thoscanello de la musica
- Jacques Lefèvre d'Étaples – Nouveau Testament, translation of the New Testament into French
- Anthony Fitzherbert
  - Diversité de courtz et leur jurisdictions
  - The Boke of Husbandrie
  - The Boke of Surveyinge and Improvements
- Martin Luther
  - Das allte Testament Deutsch, translation of the Pentateuch into German
  - The Adoration of the Sacrament (Vom Anbeten des Sakraments des heiligen leichnams Christi)
- Maximilianus Transylvanus – De Moluccis Insulis, the first published account of the Magellan–Elcano circumnavigation

== New poetry ==
- Alexander Barclay – The Mirror of Good Manners, translating Dominic Mancini's De quatuor virtutibus (approximate date)
- Hans Sachs – Die Wittenbergische Nachtigall (The Wittenberg Nightingale)
- John Skelton – The Garland of Laurel

== New drama ==
- Farsa de Inês Pereira (The Farce of Inez Pereira)

== Births ==
- February 13 – Valentin Naboth, German mathematician, astronomer and astrologer (died 1593)
- February 20 – Jan Blahoslav, Czech Christian humanist writer (died 1571)
- March 16 – Antoine Rodolphe Chevallier, French Protestant Hebraist, tutor of Queen Elizabeth I of England (died 1572)
- March 21 – Kaspar Eberhard, German theologian (died 1575)
- unknown date – Girolamo Maggi, Italian polymath (died 1572)

== Deaths ==
- August 29 – Ulrich von Hutten, German scholar, poet and reformer (born 1488)
- October – William Cornysh, dramatist, poet, actor and composer (born 1465)
- unknown date – Stephen Hawes, English poet (born c. 1474)
