= 1529 in literature =

This article contains information about the literary events and publications of 1529.

== Events ==
- Paracelsus starts to write Paragranum.

== New books ==
- Henry Cornelius Agrippa – Declamatio de nobilitate et praecellentia foeminei sexus
- Simon Fish – A Supplicacyon for the Beggers
- Hans Luft – A Proper Dialogue Between A Gentleman and a Husbandman
- Martin Luther
  - Luther's Small Catechism (Der Kleine Katechismus)
  - On War Against the Turk (Vom Kriege wider die Türken)
- Philipp Melanchthon – Commentary on the Colossians (with foreword by Martin Luther)
- Thomas More – A Supplication of Souls
- John Rastell – The Pastyme of People, the Chronydes of dyvers Realmys and most specially of the Realme of England

=== Drama ===
- Angelo Beolco ('Ruzante') – Il Parlamento de Ruzante che iera vegnú de campo (approximate date)

== Births ==
- February 23 – Onofrio Panvinio, Italian historian and antiquary (died 1568)
- June 7 – Étienne Pasquier, French poet and author (died 1615)
- December 11 – Fulvio Orsini, Italian humanist historian (died 1600)
- Unknown date – George Puttenham, English writer and critic (died 1590)

== Deaths ==
- February 2 – Baldassare Castiglione, Italian poet and author (born 1478)
- June 21 – John Skelton, English poet (born c. 1460)
- Unknown dates
  - Richard Pynson, French-born English printer (born 1448)
  - Paulus Aemilius Veronensis, Italian historian (born c. 1455)
