= 1527 in literature =

This article presents lists of the literary events and publications in 1527.

== Events ==
- June 23 – Paracelsus burns books of Avicenna.

== New books ==
=== Prose ===
- Hector Boece – Historia Scotorum
- Philippe de Commines – Mémoires (Part 2: Books 7–8)
- Hans Sachs and Andreas Osiander – Eyn wunderliche Weyssagung von dem Babsttumb, wie es ihm biz an das endt der welt gehen sol ("A wonderful prophecy of the papacy about how things will go for it up until the end of the world")

=== Poetry ===
- Pietro Aretino – Sonetti Lussuriosi ("Sonnets of lust" or "Aretino's Postures", to accompany an edition of Raimondi's erotic engravings, I Modi)

== Births ==
- July 13 – John Dee, English mathematician, astrologer and antiquary (died 1608 or 1609)
- Unknown dates
  - Luis de León, Spanish mystic and lyric poet (died 1591)
  - Łukasz Górnicki, Polish humanist and poet (died 1603)
  - Iacob Heraclid, Maltese-born humanist and military theorist (died 1563)

== Deaths ==
- c. May 6? – Ludovico Vicentino degli Arrighi, Italian calligrapher and type designer (born 1475)
- June 21 – Niccolò Machiavelli, Italian philosopher, writer, poet, musician and politician (born 1469)
- June 25 – Šiško Menčetić, Croatian poet and Ragusan nobleman (born 1457)
- October 27 – Johann Froben, printer and publisher in Switzerland (b. c.1460)
- Unknown dates
  - Andrea Fulvio, Italian Renaissance humanist, poet and antiquarian (born 1470)
  - Unknown year (or 1528) – Richard Methley, English Dominican writer and translator (born c. 1451)
