= 1516 in literature =

This article contains information about the literary events and publications of 1516.

== Events ==
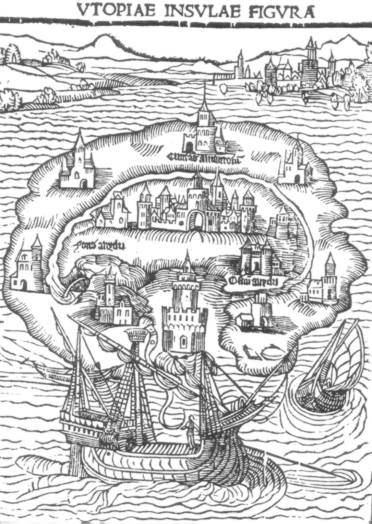
Illustration for 1516 first edition of More's Utopia

- March 1 – Desiderius Erasmus publishes a new Greek translation of the New Testament, Novum Instrumentum omne, in Basel. This year Erasmus also writes The Education of a Christian Prince although it is not published until 1532.
- c. December – Thomas More's Utopia, combining fiction and political philosophy and completed by September this year (when More presents a copy to Erasmus), is published in Leuven in Latin.
- unknown dates
  - Samuel Nedivot's the 14th century Hebrew Sefer Abudirham in Fez is the first book printed in Africa.
  - Paolo Ricci translates the 13th century Kabbalistic work Sha'are Orah by Joseph ben Abraham Gikatilla into Latin, as Portae Lucis.

== New books ==
=== Prose ===
- Heinrich Cornelius Agrippa
  - Dialogus de homine (published in Casale)
  - De triplici ratione cognoscendi Deum
- Bartolomé de las Casas – Memorial de Remedios para las Indias
- Erasmus – Novum Instrumentum omne
- Robert Fabyan (anonymous; died c. 1512) – The New Chronicles of England and France (published by Richard Pynson in London)
- Marsilio Ficino – De triplici vita
- Thomas More – Utopia
- Andre Pauernfeindt – Ergründung der ritterlichen kunst des fechtens durch freyfechter czu Vienn (Foundation of the knightly art of combat by the fencing guild of Vienna)

=== Poetry ===
- Ludovico Ariosto – Orlando Furioso (first version, April)
- Baptista Mantuanus (published in France)
  - Agellaria
  - De sacris diebus (published in Lyon)

== Births ==
- March 26 – Conrad Ges(s)ner, Swiss naturalist, bibliographer and poet (died 1565)
- April 23 – Georg Fabricius, Saxon historian, classical archaeologist and epigrapher and poet (died 1571)
- December 21 – Giuseppe Leggiadri Gallani, Parmese-born poet and dramatist (died c. 1590)

== Deaths ==
- March 22 – Baptista Mantuanus, Mantuan Carmelite reformer, humanist and Latin poet (born 1447)
- December 13 – Johannes Trithemius, German lexicographer and chronicler (born 1462)
