= List of alchemists =

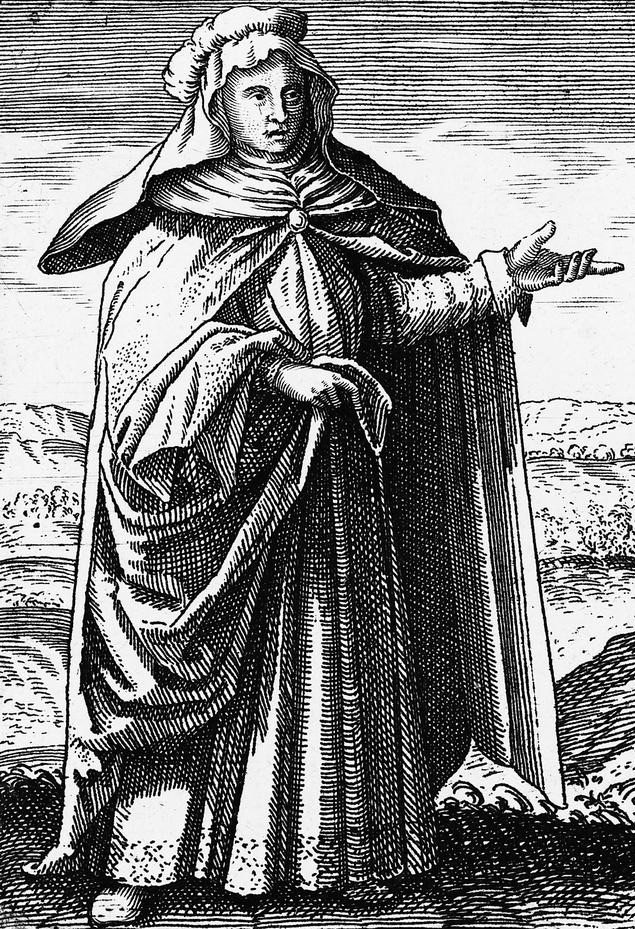
Depiction of Mary the Jewess, considered the first non-fictitious Western alchemist. From Michael Maier's Symbola Aurea MensaeDuodecim Nationum (1617)

An alchemist is a person versed in the art of alchemy. Western alchemy flourished in Greco-Roman Egypt, the Islamic world during the Middle Ages, and then in Europe from the 13th to the 18th centuries. Indian alchemists and Chinese alchemists made contributions to Eastern varieties of the art. Alchemy is still practiced today by a few, and alchemist characters still appear in recent fictional works and video games.

Many alchemists are known from the thousands of surviving alchemical manuscripts and books. Some of their names are listed below. Due to the tradition of pseudepigraphy, the true author of some alchemical writings may differ from the name most often associated with that work. Some well-known historical figures such as Albertus Magnus and Aristotle are often incorrectly named amongst the alchemists as a result.

== Legendary ==
- Anqi Sheng
- Hermes Trismegistus
- Ostanes
- Nicolas Flamel
- Perenelle Flamel
- Christian Rosenkreuz
- Abraham Eleazar

== Greco-Roman Egypt ==
- Agathodaemon
- Chymes
- Cleopatra the Alchemist
- Mary the Jewess
- Moses of Alexandria
- Olympiodorus of Thebes (c. 400)
- Paphnutia the Virgin (c. 300)
- Pseudo-Aristotle
- Pseudo-Democritus
- Stephen of Alexandria
- Zosimos of Panopolis (c. 300)

== India ==
- Kanada, sage and philosopher (6th century BC)
- Nagarjuna (born 931)
- Yogi Vemana
- Siddhar Tamil sage and philosophers
- Nayanmars Tamil sage and philosophers
- Alvars Tamil sage and philosophers
- Vallalar, Tamil 18th Century sage and philosopher
- Agastiyar Tamil Sage
- Korakkar Tamil Sage
- Thirumoolar Tamil Sage
- Bogar Tamil Sage
- Kagapujandar Tamil Sage
- Vaalmiki Tamil Sage
- Pattinathar Tamil Sage
- Kalangi Nathar Tamil Sage
- Pathanjali Tamil Sage
- Naradhar

== China ==
- Kong Anguo (ca. 156 – ca. 74 BC)
- Keng Hsien-Seng (circa A.D. 975)
- Ge Hong/ Ko Hong (283–343)
- Jiajing Emperor (1507 – 1567)
- Liu Yiming (1734–1821)
- Pao Ku Ko (third century A.D.)
- Shen Yu Hsiu (15th century)
- Sun Pu-Eh (12th century)
- Sun Simiao (died 682)
- Tao Hongjing (456–536)
- Wei Boyang
- Xu Fu (255 BC- 210 BC)
- Zhang Guo the Elder (c. 600)
- Zou Yan (305 BC – 240 BC)

== Islamic world ==
- Khalid ibn Yazid, known in Latin as Calid (died 704)
- Jabir ibn Hayyan, known in Latin as Geber (died c. 806–816)
- Dhu al-Nun al-Misri (born 796)
- Abu Bakr al-Razi (c. 865–925 or 935)
- Ibn Umayl, known in Latin as Senior Zadith (c. 900–960)
- al-Tughrai (1061–1121)
- Artephius (c. 1150)
- al-Jildaki, also written al-Jaldaki (died 1342)

== Europe ==
- Alain de Lille (1115/1128–1202/1203)
- Albertus Magnus (1193–1280)
- Roger Bacon (1214–1294)
- Pseudo-Geber (13th/14th century)
- Pseudo-Llull (1235–1315)
- John Dastin (early 14th)
- Arnold of Villanova (1245–?(before 1311))
- Jean de Meung (c.1250–c.1305)
- Petrus Bonus (Early 14th century)
- Ortolanus or Hortulanus (fl. 1358)
- Jean de Roquetaillade (Johannes de Rupescissa) (died 1336)
- Bernard Trevisan (Bernard of Treves) (1406–1490)
- Nicholas Flamel (1320-1418)
- Johann of Laz (15th century)
- George Ripley (England, 15th century)
- Thomas Norton (c. 1433–c. 1513)
- Johannes Trithemius (1462–1516)
- Johann Georg Faust (ca. 1480–1540)
- Heinrich Cornelius Agrippa (1486–1535)
- Paracelsus (1493–1541)
- Thomas Charnock (1516/1524/1526–1581)
- François Hotman (1524–1590)
- John Dee (1527–1609)
- Gerhard Dorn (c. 1530–1584)
- Martin Ruland the Elder (1532–1602)
- Richard Stanihurst (1547–1618)
- Tycho Brahe (1546–1601)
- Samuel Norton (1548–1621)
- E. H. (eine jungfer) (fl. 1574)
- Edward Kelley (1555–1597)
- Madame de la Martinville (1555 – after 1610)
- Camilla Erculiani (died after 1584)
- Basilius Valentinus (Basil Valentine) (16/17th century)
- Andreas Libavius (1555–1616)
- François Béroalde de Verville (1556–1626)
- Heinrich Khunrath (circa 1560–1605)
- Oswald Croll (circa 1563-1609)
- Melchior Cibinensis (16th century)
- Jean D'Espagnet (1564–c. 1637)
- Jeanne du Port (16th century – 17th century)
- Michael Sendivogius/Michael Sędziwój (1566–1636)
- Benedictus Figulus (born 1567)
- Michael Maier (1568–1622)
- Martin Ruland the Younger (1569–1611)
- Jacob Boehme (1575–1624)
- Jan Baptist van Helmont (1577–1644)
- Arthur Dee (1579–1651)
- Johann Daniel Mylius (c. 1583–1642)
- Johannes Valentinus Andreae (17 August 1586–27 June 1654)
- Johann Moriaen (1591–1668)
- William Backhouse (1593–1662)
- Baro Urbigerus (17th century)
- Ali Puli (17th century)
- Daniel Stolz von Stolzenberg (Daniel Stolcius) (1600–1660)
- Casper Herbach (1600-1664)
- Johannes Nicolaus Furichius (1602–1633)
- Edward Dyer (died 1607)
- Basset Jhones (born 1613)
- Elias Ashmole (1617–1692)
- Thomas Henshaw (1618–1700)
- Thomas Vaughan (Eugenius Philalethes) (1621–1666)
- Edmund Dickinson (1624–1707)
- Johann Friedrich Schweitzer (1625–1709)
- Frederick Clod (born 1625)
- Giuseppe Francesco Borri (1627–1695)
- Robert Boyle (1627–1691)
- George Starkey (Eirenaeus Philalethes) (1628–1665)
- Hening Brand (c.1630–1710)
- Johann Kunckel (1630–1703)
- Rebecca Vaughan (c.1633–1658)
- Johann Joachim Becher (1635–1682)
- Isaac Newton (1642–1727)
- Claude Duval (1643–1670)
- Louis de Vanens (1647 – December 1691)
- Dionysius Andreas Freher (1649–1728)
- Georg von Welling (1652–1727)
- Johann Konrad Dippel (1673 – 1734)
- Denis Poculot, Sieur de Blessis (floruit 1679)
- Roger de Bachimont (floruit 1688)
- Marie de Bachimont (floruit 1688)
- Comte de Saint Germain (1691 - 1784)
- Leona Constantia (fl. 1704)
- Alessandro Cagliostro (1743–1795)
- Anton Josef Kirchweger (died 1746)
- Frau von Pfuel (fl. 1751)
- James Price (1752–1783)
- Johann Christoph von Wöllner (1732–1800)
- August Nordenskiold (1754–1792)
- Sabine Stuart de Chevalier (fl. 1781)
- Madame d'Orbelin (fl. 1785)
- August Strindberg (1849–1912)
- Giuliano Kremmerz (1861–1930)

== Revival and modern ==
- Johann Georg Rapp (1757–1847)
- Mary Anne Atwood (1817–1910)
- Rudolf von Sebottendorf (1875–1945)
- Oscar Vladislas de Lubicz Milosz (1877–1939)
- R.A. Schwaller de Lubicz (1887–1961)
- Eugène Canseliet (1899–1982)
- Fulcanelli (pseudonym; dates unknown: Late 19th century–early 20th century)
- Franz Bardon (1909–1958)
- Frater Albertus (Dr. Albert Reidel) (1911–1984)
- Jean Dubuis (1919–2010)
- Terence McKenna (1946–2000)
- Franz Tausend (1884–1942)
- Nishant Chudasama (2001-Present)

== Scholars of alchemy ==
- Robert of Chester (12th century)
- Giambattista della Porta (1535-1615)
- Ethan A. Hitchcock (general) (1798–1870)
- Marcellin Berthelot (1827–1907)
- M. M. Pattison Muir (1848–1931)
- F. Sherwood Taylor (1857–1956)
- Edmund Oscar von Lippmann (1857–1940)
- Arthur Edward Waite (1857–1942)
- Richard Wilhelm (sinologist) (1873–1930)
- Carl Jung (1875–1961)
- Obed Simon Johnson (1881-1970)
- Herbert Silberer (1882–1923)
- Manly P. Hall (1901–1990)
- Titus Burckhardt (1908–1984)
- Marie-Louise von Franz (1915–1998)
- Serge Hutin (1927–1997)
- Antoine Faivre (1934-2021)
- Joost Ritman (born 1941)
- Adam McLean (born 1948)
- Nicholas Goodrick-Clarke (1953–2012)
- William R. Newman (born 1955)
- Fabrizio Pregadio (born 1957)
- Lawrence M. Principe
- Wouter Hanegraaff (born 1961)

== Indirectly involved with alchemy ==
- Rudolf II, Holy Roman Emperor (1552–1612)
- Qin Shi Huang (259–210 BC)
- Yongzheng Emperor (1678–1735)

== See also ==
- Alchemy in art and entertainment
- List of alchemical substances
- List of astrologers
- List of occultists
- List of occult symbols
