= Ledce =

Ledce may refer to places in the Czech Republic:

- Ledce (Brno-Country District), a municipality and village in the South Moravian Region
- Ledce (Hradec Králové District), a municipality and village in the Hradec Králové Region
- Ledce (Kladno District), a municipality and village in the Central Bohemian Region
- Ledce (Mladá Boleslav District), a municipality and village in the Central Bohemian Region
- Ledce (Plzeň-North District), a municipality and village in the Plzeň Region
- Ledce, a village and part of Kadlín in the Central Bohemian Region
- Ledce, a village and part of Nespeky in the Central Bohemian Region
