= 1578 in literature =

This article presents lists of the literary events and publications in 1578.

== Events ==
- December – Publication of John Lyly's didactic prose romance Euphues: the Anatomy of Wyt, originating the ornate English prose style known as Euphuism.
- unknown date – Alonso de Ercilla y Zúñiga is sent on a mission to Zaragoza by King Philip II of Spain.

== New books ==
=== Prose ===
- Diogo de Payva de Andrada – Defensio Tridentinæ fidei (posthumously published)
- George Best – A True Discourse of the Late Voyages of Discoverie...under the Conduct of Martin Frobisher
- John Florio – First Fruits
- Jaroš Griemiller – Rosarium philosophorum
- Gabriel Harvey – Smithus, vel Musarum lachrymae
- John Lyly – Euphues: the Anatomy of Wit
- Margaret Tyler, The Mirrour of Princely Deedes and Knighthood

=== Drama ===
- Jan Kochanowski – Odprawa posłów greckich ("The Dismissal of the Greek Envoys")
- George Whetstone – Promos and Cassandra

=== Poetry ===
- See 1578 in poetry

== Births ==
- April 2 – Francesco Amico, Italian theologian
- June – Mary Fitton, possible inspiration for Shakespeare's The Dark Lady (died 1647)
- August 24 – John Taylor, English poet and waterman (died 1653)
- unknown dates
  - Giambattista Andreini, Italian dramatist and actor (died 1650)
  - Jacob Bidermann, German dramatist (died 1627)
  - George Hakewill, English author and cleric (died 1649)

== Deaths ==
- May 4 – Martin Eisengrein, German theologian and polemicist (born 1535)
- July 27 – Jane Lumley, English translator from Greek and Latin (born 1537)
- August 11 – Pedro Nunes, Portuguese polymath (born 1502)
- October 12 – Cornelius Gemma, Dutch physician, astronomer and astrologer (born 1535)
- unknown date – Gabriele Giolito de' Ferrari, Italian printer (born c. 1508)
- probable – Johann Stumpf, Swiss writer on history and topography (born 1500)
