= Martin Ruland =

Martin Ruland is the name of two German physicians and alchemists:

- Martin Ruland the Elder (1532-1602)
- Martin Ruland the Younger (1569 –1611)
