= Dubuis =

Dubuis may refer to:

== People ==
- Claude Marie Dubuis (1817-1895), French prelate
- Jean Dubuis (1919-2010), French esotericist, qabalist, and alchemist

== Others ==
- Roger Dubuis, Swiss luxury manafacturer
