= Madame de la Martinville =

Madame de la Martinville (1555 – after 1610) was a French alchemist in the Paracelsian school. Historian Didier Kahn has identified her as Louise Robot, and her husband as Charles le Fort. She is also referred to as Matrone de Martinvilla and Madame Martin Viel. She has sometimes been identified as the pseudonymous alchemist known as Quercetin's daughter, but that was more likely Jeanne du Port.

Martinville was closely associated with the prominent French physician and advocate of chemical-based Paracelsian approach to medicine, Joseph Duchesne (also known as Quercetan or Quercetanus); he shared chemical preparations with her as early as 1589. In 1595 and 1596, Martinville was at the center of the "Juranville Affair" which scandalized Geneva society. Her mother-in-law accused Martinville of engaging in an incestuous relationship with her step-father, Jean Escoréol, and Duchesne used his influence to defend her. In fact, Escoréol had sexually assaulted Martinville sometime around 1576, which he confessed on his deathbed a few years before the affair came to light.

As an alchemist, Martinville followed the Paracelsian approach, like her mentor (she is sometimes described as Duchesne's "spiritual daughter"). Her approach bears many similarities to modern science, and she was noted among her peers for her "provings" of chemical "receipts" (recipes). Her first publication was in 1609, the same year Duchesne died. The original French version has been lost, but a Latin translation published in Stuttgart in 1615 as Epistola nobilissima Matrone de Martinvilla ad Dom. Quercitanum survives in Copenhagen's Royal Library. Her 1610 treatise, Discours philosophical, survives in the original French. Both texts use a mixture of chemical and symbolic language, typical of Paracelsian alchemical writing, and the Discours explicitly discusses Paracelsus.

In 2026, German artist Anselm Kiefer included a painting of Martinville in his collection, The Women Alchemists, which was displayed in Milan's Sala delle Cariatidi as part of the cultural showcase of the 2026 Winter Olympics.
