= Jaroš Griemiller =

Czech alchemist

Jaroš Griemiller of Třebsko was a Czech alchemist, remembered for his illuminated manuscript Rosarium philosophorum. He worked under Wilhelm von Rosenberg in the 1570s, and dedicated the Rosarium to him. He completed work on the manuscript in 1578 while he was working in Český Krumlov.
