= Joseph Duchesne =

French physician (d. 1609)

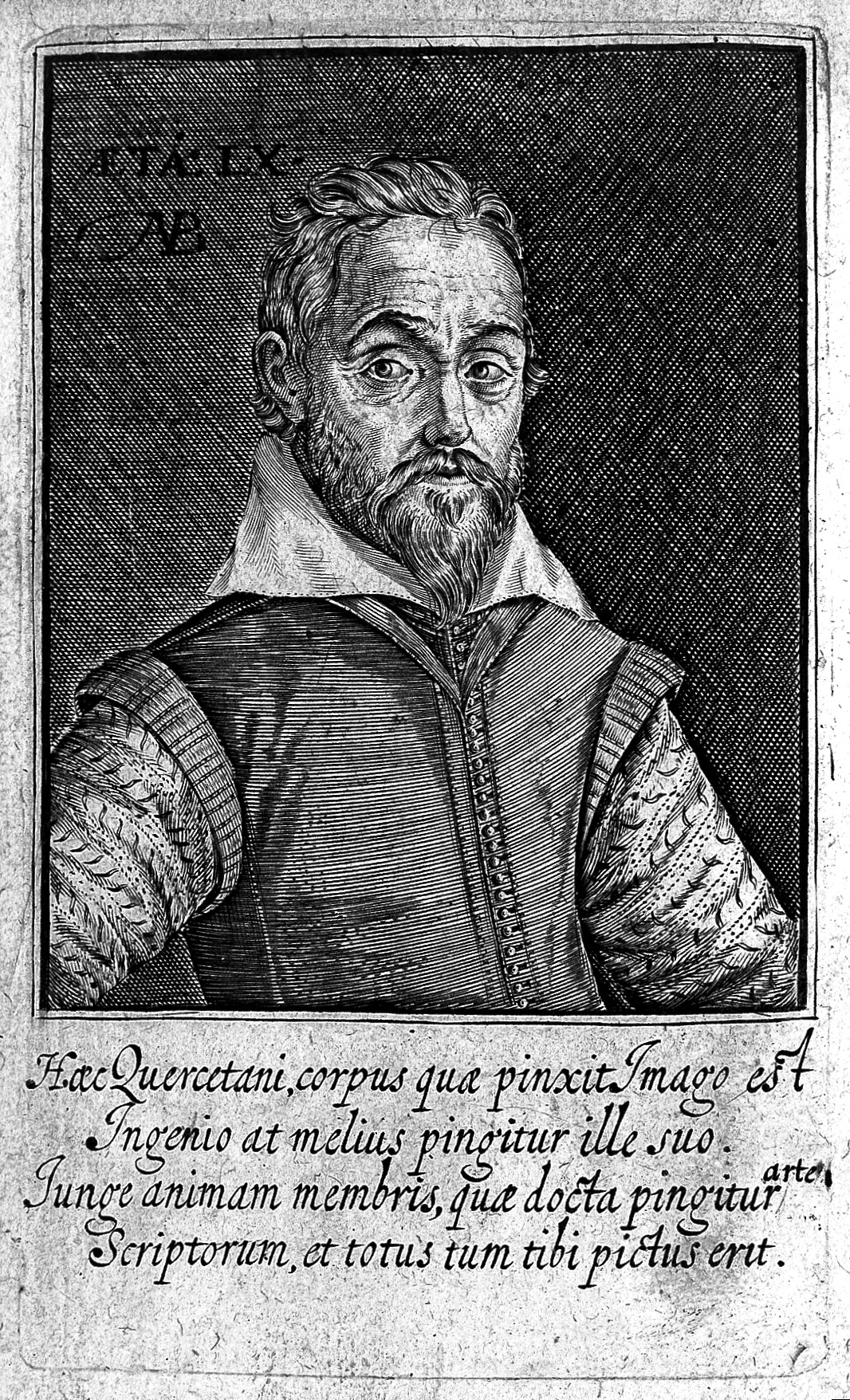
Etching of Duchesne from a 1641 edition of Recueil des plus curieux et rares secrets touchant la médecine metallique et minerale

Joseph Duchesne or du Chesne (Quercetan, Latin Josephus Quercetanus) (c. 1544, Lectoure – 1609) was a French physician. A follower of Paracelsus, he is now remembered for important if transitional alchemical theories. He called sugar toxic, saying: "Under its whiteness, sugar hides a great blackness."

== Biography ==
Duchesne was born around 1544 in Lectoure, Armagnac and studied at Montpellier, and then at Basel, where he received a medical diploma in 1573. During the 1570s at Lyon, he married Anne Trie the granddaughter of Guillaume Budé, and became a Calvinist convert. He went into medical practice and became physician to Francis, Duke of Anjou.

He left Lyon in 1580 for Kassel in Hesse, and moved on to Geneva, where in 1584 he received citizenship. Duchesne was elected to the Council of Two Hundred in 1587, and undertook diplomatic missions to Bern, Basel, Schaffhausen and Zürich in the years 1589 to 1596. In 1594 he became a member of the Council of Sixty.

In 1598, following the Edict of Nantes, Duchesne returned to France and became physician-in-Ordinary attending Henry IV of France. In 1601 Nicolas Brûlart de Sillery gave him a mission as envoy to the Swiss cantons. In 1604 he went to the court of Maurice of Hesse-Cassel where he gave scientific demonstrations in a laboratory set up for him.

Duchesne's daughter, Jeanne du Port, likely studied under her father and translated parts of the Rosarium philosophorum into English.

== Works ==
- 1576 : Sclopetarius–On wounds made by muskets and similar weapons
- 1603 : De priscorum philosophorum verae medicinae material
- 1604 : Ad veritatem hermeticae medicinae ex Hippocratis veterumque decretis ac therapeusi
- 1606 : Tetras gravissimorum totius capitis affectuum, Marburg: Paulus Egenolphus, 1606.
- 1607 : Pharmacopea dogmaticorum
  - (in Italian) La farmacopea overo antidotario riformato del signore Giuseppe Quercetano…, translated by Giacomo Ferrari. Venice, 1619
  - (in French) La pharmacopée des dogmatiques, 2nd ed. with emendations. Rouen: Corneille Pitreson, 1639
- 1619 : Le Ricchezze della riformata Farmacopea del Giuseppe Quercetano. Nouamente di Favella Latina traportata in Italiana da Giacomo Ferrari - Venice: Guerigli, 1619.
- 1625 : Pharmacopeia restituta - Strassburg: Zetzner, 1625.
- 1625 : Diaeteticon polyhistoricum- Strassburg: Zetzner, 1625.
- 1625 : Tétrade des plus grièves maladies de tout le cerveau.
- 1639 : Traicté familier de l'exacte preparation spagirique des medicamens, Rouen: Corneille Pitreson
- 1648 : Quercetanus redivivus, hoc est, ars medica dogmatico-hermetica Vol.1-3 - Francofurti: Beyer, 1648.
