= Buch der heiligen Dreifaltigkeit =

15th-century alchemical treatise

The Buch der heiligen Dreifaltigkeit ("Book of the Holy Trinity") is an early 15th-century alchemical treatise, attributed to Frater Ulmannus (latinization of the German given name Ulmann, from OHG uodal-man), a German Franciscan.

The text survives in at least four 15th-century manuscripts, the archetype Cod. 78 A 11 (Berlin), dated to between 1410–1419, and three copies,: Heidelberg Cpg 843 Fasc. 3 (15th century); Munich, Staatsbibl., Cgm 598 (late 15th century, after 1467) and St. Gallen, Kantonsbibl., VadSlg Ms. 428 (dated 1488).

The treatise describes the alchemical process in terms of Christian mythology. The theme of the book is the analogy of the passion, death and resurrection of the Christ with the alchemical process leading to the lapis philosophorum. The text is one of the most important alchemical works of late medieval Germany. It is not atypically a combination of alchemy and Christian mysticism. Ganzenmüller (1956) speculated that the book may have been known to Jakob Böhme.

The Berlin manuscript contains drawings, some of which re-appear in later (16th century) alchemical works such as the 1550 Rosarium philosophorum.

The work became notable among German nobility, who, on the eve of the German Renaissance, showed great interest in alchemy as a fashionable subject while at the same time rejecting occult magic as impious. Ulmannus' work as an explicitly Christian treatment of alchemy could resolve this dilemma and became a prestige possession in 15th century libraries.

A revision of Ulmannus' text was prepared in 1433 for Johannes von Bayreuth, the eldest son of Friedrich von Brandenburg. Copies of this survive in MS. Dresden N 110 (dated 1492) and MS Gotha Landesbibliothek Ch. B. 254 (17th century). Other versions of the work are found in German National Museum Nuremberg MS 80061, John Rylands Library MS Germ 1, the Wellcome Library, London, MS. 164, and other sources.

An edition of the work was in preparation (as of 2009) as a Würzburg dissertation.
