= Johann of Laz =

Johann of Laz, or Johannes von Laaz, Joannes de Lasnioro, was a Bohemian alchemist during the first half of the fifteenth century.

Little is known about Johann's life, but his name probably indicates that he came from Ledce u Židlochovic (German Laatz).

His Tractatus aureus de lapide philosophorum (The Golden Treatise on the Philosopher's Stone) was first printed in 1611 and was later reprinted in Zetzner's Theatrum Chemicum. In that text, he presents a transmutation of metals from quicksilver, sulfur, and gold. Laz also claims to be a student of the alchemist Anthony of Florence (Antonius de Florentia), who was supposed to have been murdered in Bohemia.

Benedikt Nikolaus Petraeus cites Johann of Laz in the foreword to his edition of Basil Valentine's Chymischen Schriften (1667). In that text, he discusses the supposed alchemical activity of Barbara von Cilli, widow of the Holy Roman Emperor Sigismund of Luxembourg. According to Laz, she exchanged ideas about the transmutation of metals with many merchants.

== Bibliography ==
- Ferguson, John. Bibliotheca Chemica. vol. 2, p. 10. (1906).
- Karpenko, Vladimír. "The Oldest Alchemical Manuscript in the Czech Language". Ambix 37, part 2 (July 1990): 61–73.
- Kopp, H. Die Alchemie in älterer und neuerer Zeit, vol. 1, p. 160. Olms: Hildesheim, 1971.
- Telle, Joachim. "Laaz, Johannes v." In Lexikon des Mittelalters, vol. 5. Artemis & Winkler: München, Zürich: 1991.
