= Chinese alchemy =

Ancient Chinese approach to alchemy

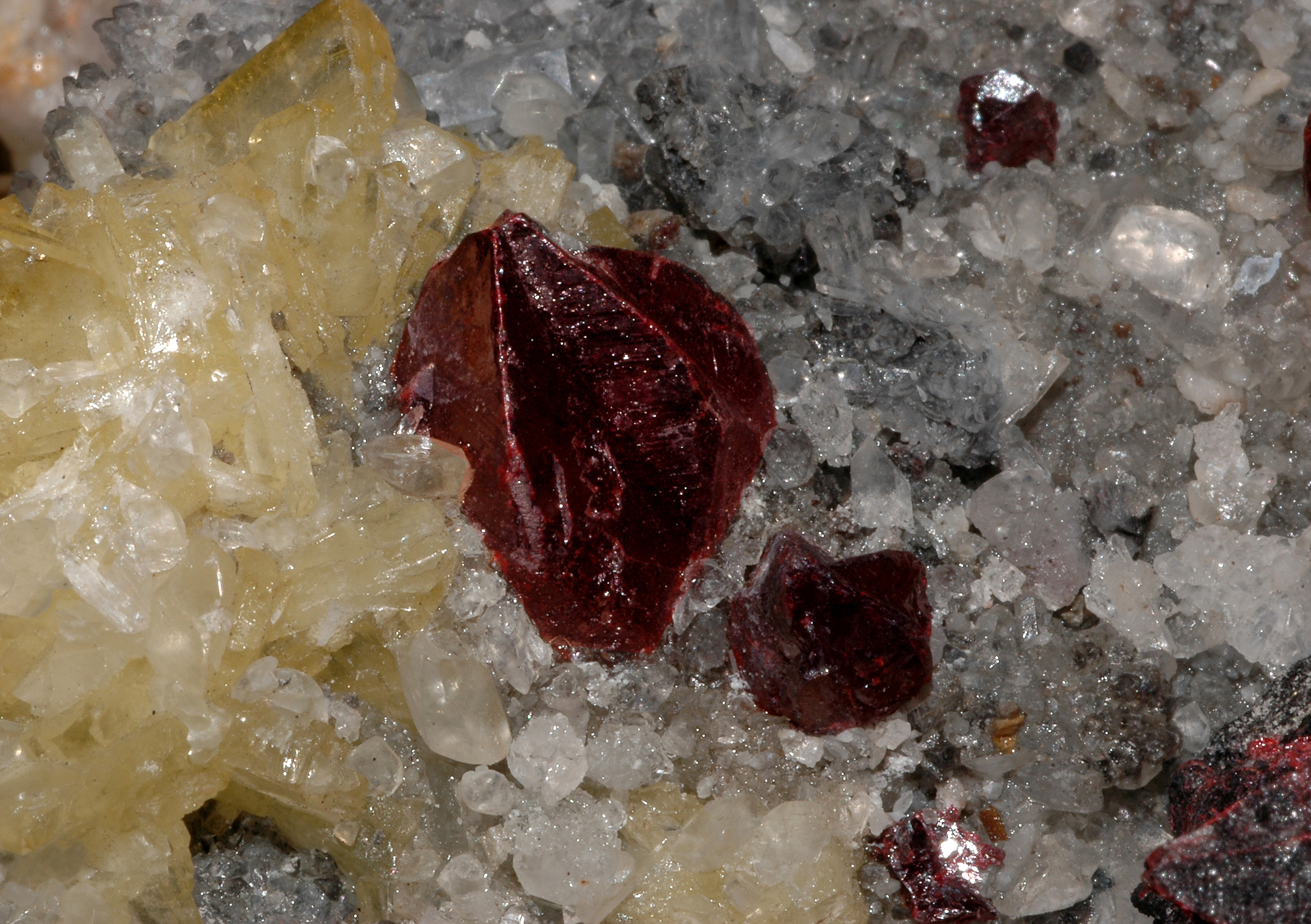
Crystals of cinnabar, crystals of barite, crystals of quartz, crystals of calcite : Wanshan Mine, Wanshan District, Tongren Prefecture, Guizhou Province, China, an example of material historically associated with Chinese alchemy

Chinese alchemy (煉丹術 liàndānshù "method for refining cinnabar") is a historical Chinese approach to alchemy. According to original texts such as the Cantong qi, the body is understood as the focus of cosmological processes summarized in the five agents of change, or Wuxing, the observation and cultivation of which leads the practitioner into alignment and harmony with the Tao. Therefore, the traditional view in China is that alchemy focuses mainly on longevity and the purification of one's spirit, mind and body, providing, health, longevity and wisdom, through the practice of Qigong and wuxingheqidao. The consumption and use of various concoctions known as alchemical medicines or elixirs, each of which having different purposes but largely were concerned with immortality.

Pao zhi (炮制; Pao chi) or Processing (Chinese materia medica) is used in Traditional Chinese Medicine, such as honey or wine frying and roasting with toxic metals such as mercury, lead, and arsenic.

Daoism had two distinct parts, the classical Daojia (道家 Tao chia), which was mystical and stemmed primarily from Laozi and Zhuangzi, and the more popular Daojiao (道教 Tao chiao), which was the popular, magical and alchemical side of Daoism. In general, classical Daojia was more austere, whereas Daojiao was more practiced by the general populace.

Chinese alchemy was introduced to the West by Obed Simon Johnson.

== Process and purpose ==
By refining bases into gold and ingesting the "fake" or synthetic gold as a prepared pill, or jindan (金丹), alchemists believed that immortal life would be delivered. The idea that fake gold was superior to real gold arose because the alchemists believed the combination of a variety of substances (and the transformation of these substances through roasting or burning) gave the final substance a spiritual value, possessing a superior essence when compared to natural gold. Gold and mercury (in the form of cinnabar) were the most sought-after substances to manipulate and ingest. These metals were believed to have an inner essence of longevity due to them being relatively chemically inert and resistant to weathering as opposed to common metals like copper and iron, and are thus hypothesized to transfer their essence to the consumer and extend life as a result.

Cinnabar is a mineral with a reddish-brown colour and is the most common source of mercury in nature. The significance of its red colour and difficulty with which it was refined implied to alchemists its connection with the search for immortality. The colour was significant to symbolic belief as well, red being considered in Chinese culture to be the "zenith of the colour representing the sun, fire, royalty and energy." Cinnabar could also be roasted, which produced liquid mercury (also known as quicksilver). This substance was ingested but it could also be combined with sulphur and burned again to return to its natural form of cinnabar, the solid seen as the yang to quicksilver's yin. In China, gold was quite rare, so it was usually imported from other surrounding countries. However, cinnabar could be refined in the mountains of Sichuan and Hunan provinces in central China.

Although the majority of xian (immortality) elixirs were combinations of jindan, many other elixirs were formed by combining metallic bases with natural herbs or animal by-products. The rhinoceros' horn was commonly used in medicines and elixirs and was held to have fertility-increasing abilities. Elixirs could also have more lethal components like arsenic and sulphur as ingredients.

=== East Asian vs Eastern Mediterranean views ===
Both the Eastern practice and the later Western practice of alchemy are remarkably similar in their methods and ultimate purpose. To be sure, the desire to create an elixir of immortality was more appealing to the Taoists, but European alchemists were not averse to seeking out formulas for various longevity-boosting substances. The secret of transmuting one element into another, specifically base metals into gold or silver, was equally explored by both schools for obvious reasons.

In the European outlook, the ability to turn relatively worthless materials into gold was attractive enough to allow medieval alchemy to enjoy extensive practice long after the Chinese form had been forgotten. Alternatively, transmutation was also a means of accruing the precious metals that were key in making life-extending elixirs, and were otherwise expensive and difficult to obtain. Alchemical knowledge in the East and West favored different opinions of the true form of alchemy due to different theological views and cultural biases, however these disputes do not lessen the integrity of alchemy's canonical nature.

Chinese alchemy specifically was consistent in its practice from the beginning, and there was relatively little controversy among its practitioners. Definition amongst alchemists varied only in their medical prescription for the elixir of immortality, or perhaps only over their names for it, of which sinology has counted about 1000. Because the Chinese approach was through the fundamental doctrine of Yin and Yang, the influence of the I Ching, and the teachings of the Five Elements, Chinese alchemy had its roots considerably more in obtaining a higher mental-spiritual level.

In the West, there were conflicts between advocates of herbal and "chemical" (mineral) pharmacy, but in China, mineral remedies were always accepted. In Europe, there were conflicts between alchemists who favored gold-making and those who thought medicine the proper goal, but the Chinese always favored the latter. Since alchemy rarely achieved any of these goals, it was an advantage to the Western alchemist to have the situation obscured, and the art survived in Europe long after Chinese alchemy had simply faded away.

== Origins ==
Despite much research, many scholars are still unable to marshal conflicting evidence in order to determine when exactly Chinese alchemy started. It was thought that China was making gold about one thousand years before Confucius' time, but this is contradicted by other academics stating that during the 5th century BCE there was no word for gold and that it was an unknown metal in China.

However, despite the uncertain origins, there are enough similarities in the ideas of practices of Chinese alchemy and the Daoist tradition so that one can conclude that Laozi and Zhang Daoling are the creators of this tradition. In her article, Radcliffe tells that Zhang rejected serving the Emperor and retreated to live in the mountains. At this time, he met Laozi and together they created (or attempted to create) the Elixir of Life (Radcliffe, 2001), by creating the theory that would be used in order to achieve the making of such an elixir. This is the starting point to the Chinese tradition of alchemy, whose purpose was to achieve immortality.

One of the first evidence of Chinese alchemy being openly discussed in history is during the Qin's First Emperor's period when Huan Kuan (73–49 BC) states how modifying forms of nature and ingesting them will bring immortality to the person who drinks them. Before Huan Kuan, the idea of alchemy was to turn base metals into gold. Conflicting research on the origins of alchemy are further demonstrated by Cooper, who claims that alchemy "flourished well before 144 BCE, for at that date the Emperor issued an edict which ordered public execution for anyone found making counterfeit gold". This suggests that people were well aware of how to heat the metals in order to change them into a desired form. A further counter to Pregadio from Cooper is the latter's contention that an emperor in 60 BCE had hired "a well-known scholar, Liu Hsiang, as Master of the Recipes so that he could make alchemical gold and prolong the Emperor's life." All of these conflicting origins considered, it is nearly impossible to claim any absolute knowledge on the origins of Chinese alchemy. However, historical texts of Daoist teaching include alchemical practices, most of which posit the existence of an elixir or the Golden Elixir that, when ingested, gives the drinker eternal life.

As there is a direct connection between Daoism and Laozi, some suggest he played a major role in the creation of Chinese alchemy. Zhou Dynasty philosopher Zou Yan is said to have written many of the alchemical books, although none of them have ever been found, nor have the existing ones been credited to him. The likeliest proponents of Chinese alchemy are as previously stated, Laozi, and Zhang Daoling as well as Zhuangzi. Each of these men are major icons in Daoist teachings. Although these three are credited with the creation of alchemy, there is no definitive proof to suggest or dispute that they were responsible for its creation.

=== Yin and Yang ===
The concept of yin-yang is pervasive throughout Chinese alchemical theory. Metals were categorized as being male or female, and mercury and sulphur especially were thought to have powers relating to lunar and solar respectively.

Prior to Taoist tradition, the Chinese already had very definitive notions of the natural world's processes and "changes", especially involving the wu xing: Water, Fire, Earth, Metal and Wood. These were commonly thought to be interchangeable with one another; each were capable of becoming another element. The concept is integral, as the belief in outer alchemy necessitates the belief in natural elements being able to change into others. The cyclical balance of the elements relates to the binary opposition of yin-yang, and so it appears quite frequently.

== Outer and inner alchemy ==
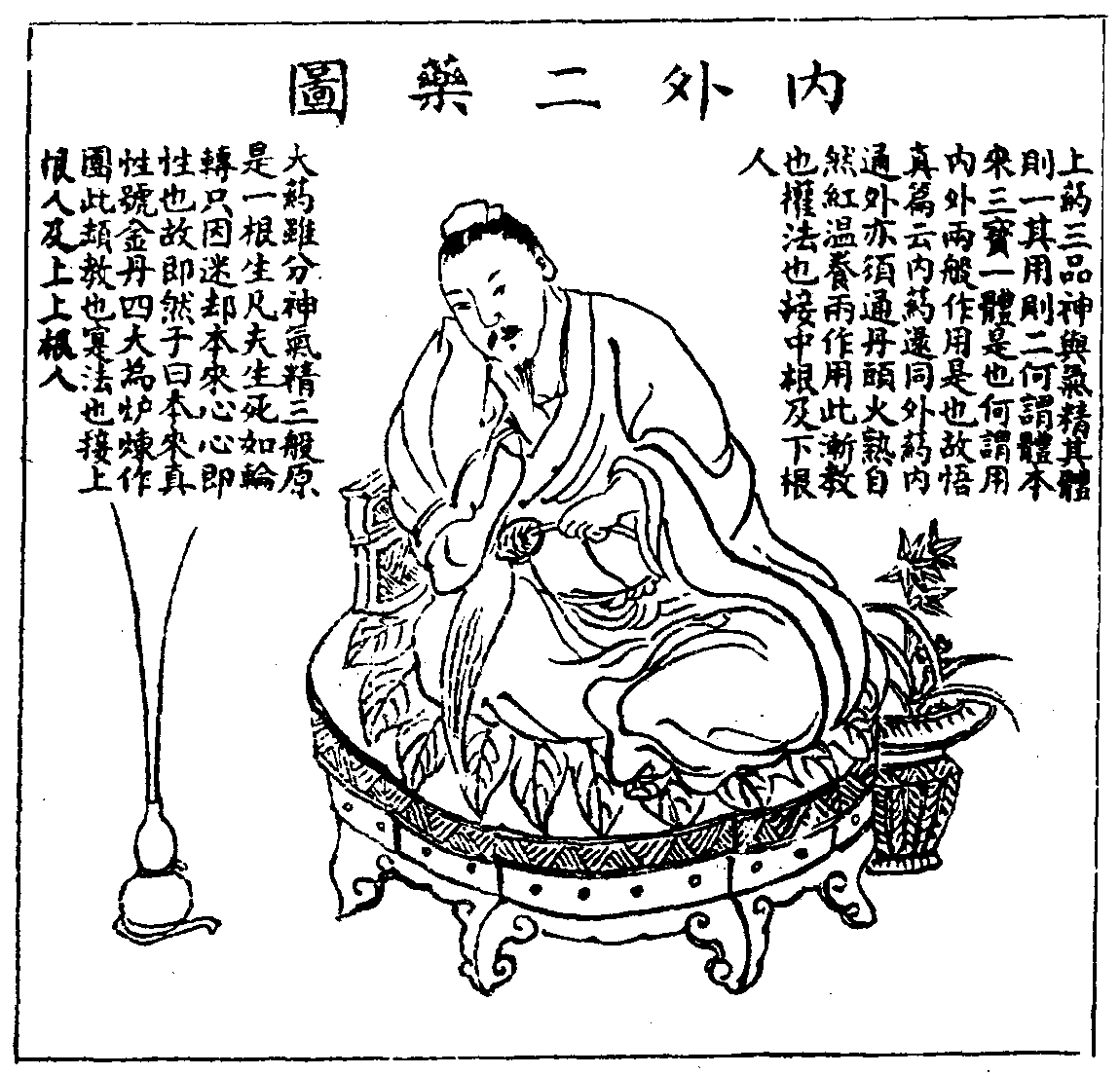
The Inner and Outer Alchemies 內外二藥圖, 1615 Xingming guizhi

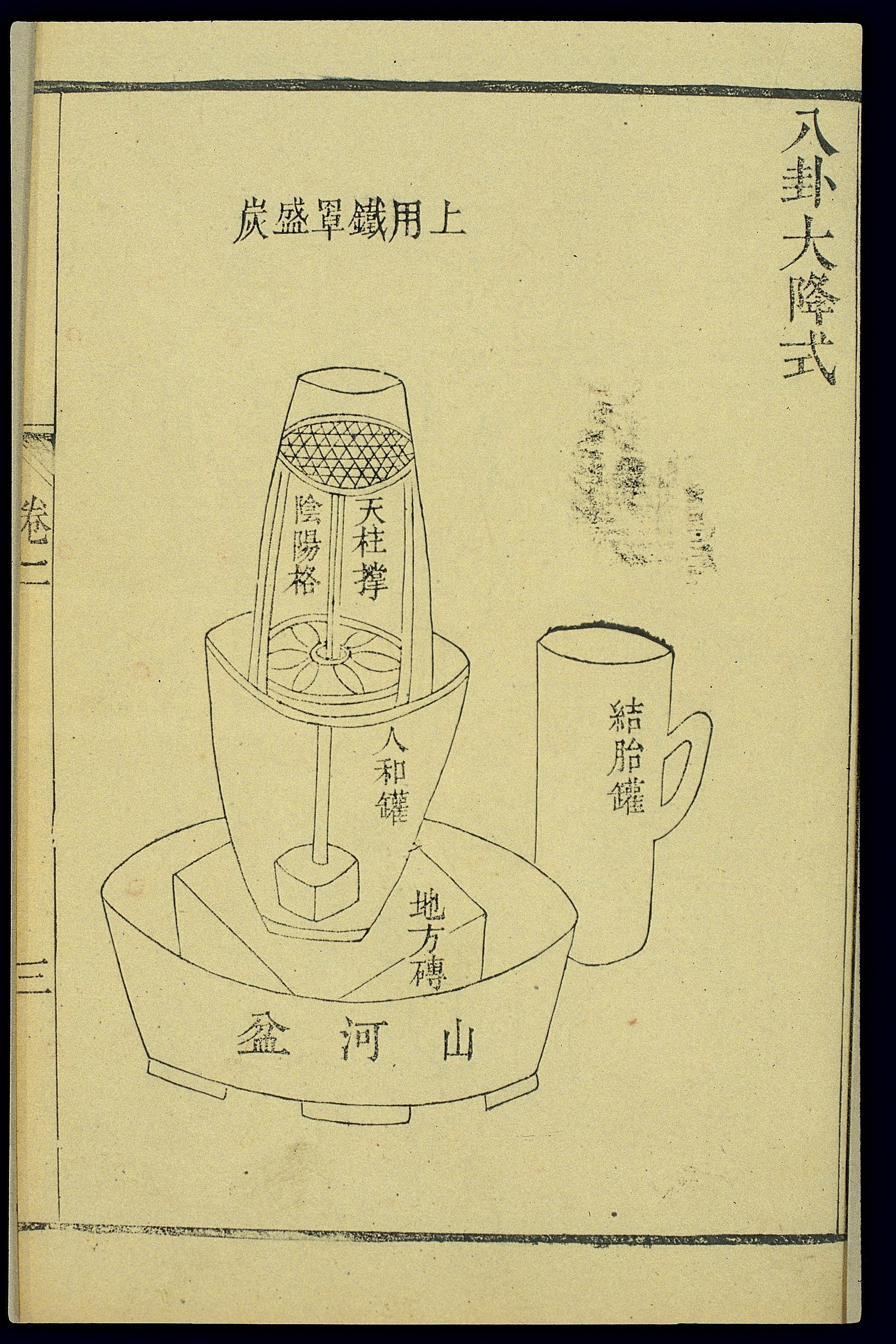
Chinese woodblock illustration of a waidan alchemical refining furnace, 1856 Waike tushuo (外科圖説, Illustrated Manual of External Medicine)

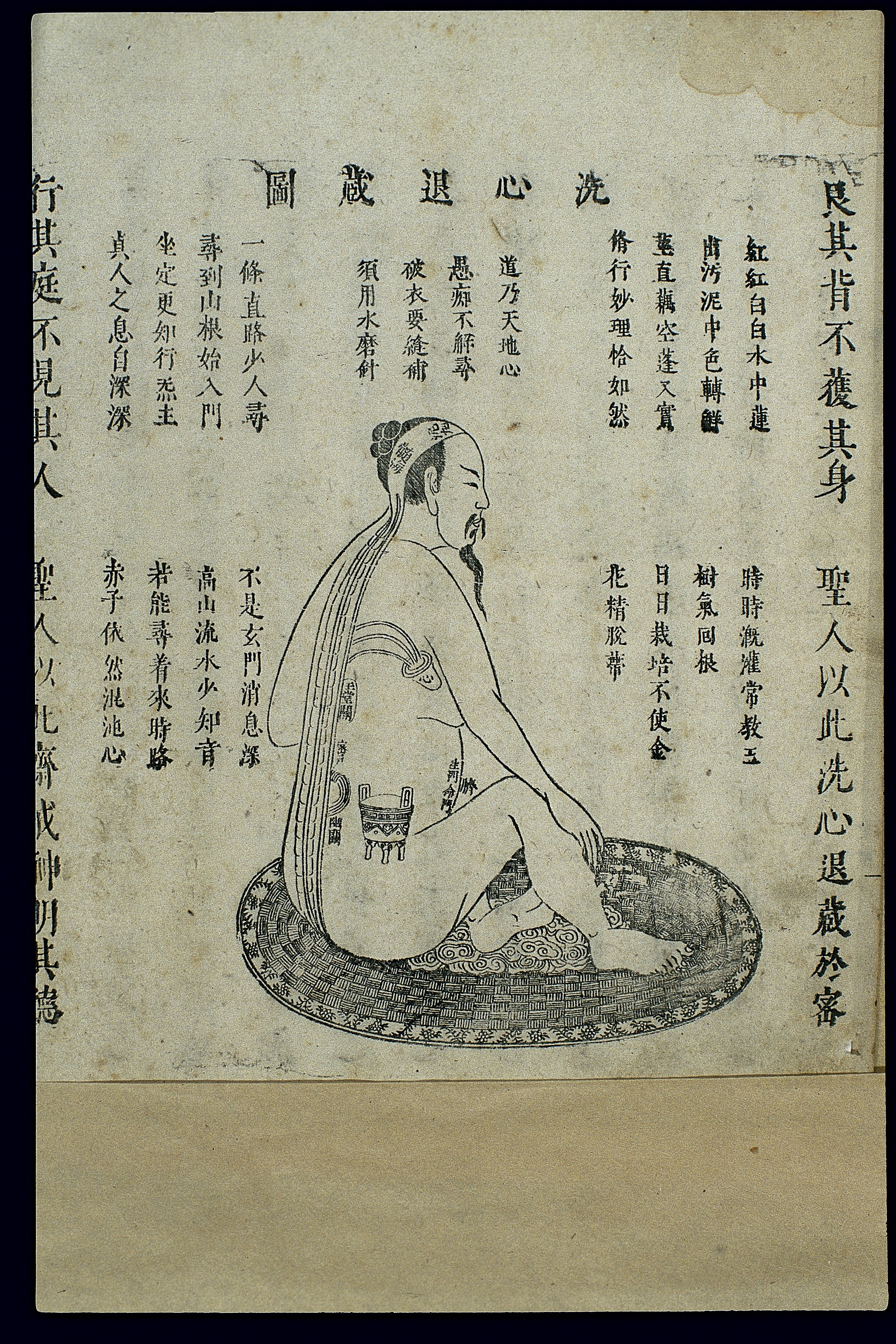
Chinese woodblock illustration of neidan "Cleansing the heart-mind and retiring into concealment", 1615 Xingming guizhi (Pointers on Spiritual Nature and Bodily Life)

Chinese alchemy can be divided into two methods of practice, waidan or "external alchemy" and neidan or "internal alchemy". Doctrine can be accessed to describe these methods in greater detail; the majority of Chinese alchemical sources can be found in the Daozang, the "Taoist Canon".

=== Outer alchemy (Waidan) ===
The meaning of waidan derives from wai (outside, exterior) and dan referring to alchemical operations, such as the preparation of chemical elixirs, made from cinnabar, realgar, and other substances generally involving mercury, sulfur, lead, and arsenic or else the animal and botanical products which are found in Chinese herbology and Traditional Chinese medicine. Waidan refers to practices relating to the process of making an elixir often containing herbal or chemical substances found outside of the body. This process involves esoteric oral instructions, building a laboratory, kindling and sustaining the special fires used in the production process, rules of seclusion and purification for the alchemist to follow, and various practices including the performance of ceremonies to protect the self and the ritual area. Waidan can also include following a dietary regimen which prescribes or proscribes certain foods. Preparing medicines and elixirs can be referred to as outer practices or waidan as these practices occur outside of the body until they are verified by the ingestion of medicines, herbs, and pills to bring about physical changes within the body, separate to the soul.

=== Inner alchemy (Neidan) ===
The term Neidan can be divided into two parts: Nei, meaning inner, and Dan, which refers to alchemy, elixir, and cinnabar (mercury). Neidan uses techniques such as: composed meditation techniques, visualization, breathing and bodily posture exercises. Breathing exercises were used to preserve jing or "life essence" and bodily postures were used to improve qi or "energy" flow in the body. Neidan comprises the elixir from the principles of Traditional Chinese Medicine and the cultivation of substances already present in the body, in particular the manipulation of three substances in the body known as the "Three Treasures".

The three treasures are:

1. Jing ("life essence"). A person is born with Jing and it governs the developmental growth processes in the body. Since people are born with a certain amount of Jing, it is taught that a person can increase their Jing through dietary and lifestyle practices.
2. Qi (translated as "energy" or "vital energy"). Qi energy results from the interaction of yin and yang. A healthy body is constantly circulating Qi.
3. Shen (translated as "spirit", "mind" or "spiritual energy"). Shen is the energy used in mental, spiritual and creative functioning (Lu, 30).

The three treasures are also associated with locations in the body where the alchemical process takes place. These locations include major organs and energy centers, called dantians.

1. Jing is found in the Kidneys and possibly the adrenal glands.
2. Qi resides in Lower Dantian or "elixir field" and it is located about an inch down from the navel.
3. Shen is seated in the Middle Dantian, which is the Heart.

During the Han dynasty and after, Neidan and Daoist martial arts gradually merged into one, becoming Neijia martial arts. Famous Taijiquan masters who practiced Neijia include Wu Tunan (吳圖南) and Chen Weiming (陳微明).

== Associated risks ==
When ingested, these compounds did not always result in the desired outcome. Many individuals died or had psychological difficulties after taking certain elixirs. However, the loss of life may not have seemed a large risk, when compared with the promise of the afterlife. Although these elixirs were lethal or dangerous, there is some contention that these individuals were not ignorant of the fatality of some of the materials they were ingesting.

There were certain grades of immortality, so if the practiced alchemist died, the level of immortality they achieved was determined by their corpse. If their corpse was sweet-smelling, it was said that they had achieved immortality in an ephemeral state. Likewise, if their corpse disappeared, leaving behind only the clothes, such as in the death of the adept Ge Hong (Ko Hung) according to the legend, this was another form of immortality known as shih chieh hsien (corpse-free immortals).

== Conception of medicine ==
Medicines can be used to heal ailments on the exterior or interior of the body, to control the ageing of the body, or even to prevent death. The term medicine and elixir are virtually interchangeable because of the array of ailments they can influence. The difference between defining an elixir from a medicine was that many medicines were composed mainly of all natural products like herbs and animal products. Never the animals themselves, only their products, which could consist of dung or fur. Although metal compounds are more potent when curing ailments, herbs were used because they were easier to combine and more abundantly available. To make medicines one would use ingredients like: Reynoutria, which would be used in famous longevity pills like Fo-Ti; Asparagus, which was used because it was known to increase strength; sesame, which prevents senility; and pine which has over 300 different uses. Mushrooms were and still are very popular, they are known as the Lingzhi (Ganoderma) and have thousands of purposes within Chinese alchemy.

== Practitioners ==
=== Chinese women alchemists ===
With the rise of alchemy in Chinese civilization, alchemy began to be seen as an art. Among many practitioners, a significant number of women were known to have mastered this art. The earliest recorded woman alchemist had the family name of Fang (Chinese: 方), and lived around the first century B.C. Raised in a scholarly family skilled in the alchemical arts, she studied alchemy with one of the Emperor Han Wu Ti's spouses, and therefore had access to the highest levels of society. Fang was credited with the discovery of the method to turn mercury into silver. It was believed that she may have used the chemical technique of silver extraction from ores using mercury, where pure silver residue is left behind from the boiled mercury. Fang's husband was Cheng Wei (simplified Chinese: 程伟; traditional Chinese: 程偉; see zh:程偉). Details of Fang's life were recorded by author and alchemist Ge Hong.

Keng Hsien-Seng (circa A.D. 975) was another female alchemist who, according to the science writings of Wu Shu "mastered the art of the yellow and white [alchemy] with many other strong transformations, mysterious and incomprehensible". Wu Shu also described Keng as being acquainted with other Taoist techniques and was believed able to control the spirits. She also mastered the transformation of mercury and "snow" into silver, probably using the technique of extraction of silver from its ores, as well as using a primitive type of Soxhlet process to continuously extract camphor into alcohol.

Other female alchemists who have been recognized in Chinese literature are Pao Ku Ko (third century A.D.), Thai Hsuan Nu, Sun Pu-Eh (12th century), and Shen Yu Hsiu (15th century).

== See also ==
- Chinese alchemical elixir poisoning
- Alchemy and chemistry in medieval Islam
- Cold-Food Powder
- Langgan
- Processing (Chinese materia medica)
- The Secret of the Golden Flower
- Taoist diet
- Yellow Court Classic

== Additional bibliography ==
- Jefferson, R.B., Doctrine of the Elixir. Coombe Springs Press 1982. ISBN 0-900306-15-7.
- Miller, James, and Elijah Siegler. "Of Alchemy and Authenticity: Teaching About Daoism Today". In Teaching Theology and Religion, Vol. 10 (2007): 101–108. ISSN 1368-4868.
- Pregadio, Fabrizio. The Seal of the Unity of the Three: A Study and Translation of the Cantong qi, the Source of the Taoist Way of the Golden Elixir. Mountain View: Golden Elixir Press, 2011. ISBN 978-0-9843082-8-6. Partial online version, retrieved March 29, 2012.
- Pregadio, Fabrizio. The Way of the Golden Elixir: A Historical Overview of Taoist Alchemy. Mountain View: Golden Elixir Press, 2012. [PDF, 60 pp., free download.]
- Pregadio, Fabrizio. Chinese Alchemy: An Annotated Bibliography of Works in Western Languages. Mountain View: Golden Elixir Press, 2009.
- Radcliffe, Jeannie. "Alchemy and Daoism". 2001.
- Rouselle, Irwin. "Spiritual Guidance in Contemporary Taoism". In Spiritual Disciplines, Papers from the Eranos Yearbooks. Princeton University Press, 1985. ISBN 0-691-01863-4.
- Sivin, Nathan. "The Theoretical Background of Laboratory Alchemy". In Joseph Needham et al., Science and Civilisation in China, vol. V, part 5. Cambridge University Press, 1980, pp. 210–305.
- Sivin, Nathan. "Comparing Greek and Chinese Philosophy and Science". In Medicine, Philosophy and Religion in Ancient China, chapter 1. Variorum, 1995.
- Smith, Huston. The World's Religions. Harper Collins, 1991.
- Wang, Mu. Foundations of Internal Alchemy: The Taoist Practice of Neidan. Golden Elixir Press, 2011. ISBN 978-0-9843082-5-5.
- Wilhelm, Richard. Secret of the Golden Flower. Routledge and Kegan Paul, 1931. ISBN 0-15-679980-4.
- Yu, Lu K'uan, Taoist Yoga. Rider, 1970. ISBN 0-7126-1725-6.
