= Sabine Stuart de Chevalier =

French alchemist of the 18th century

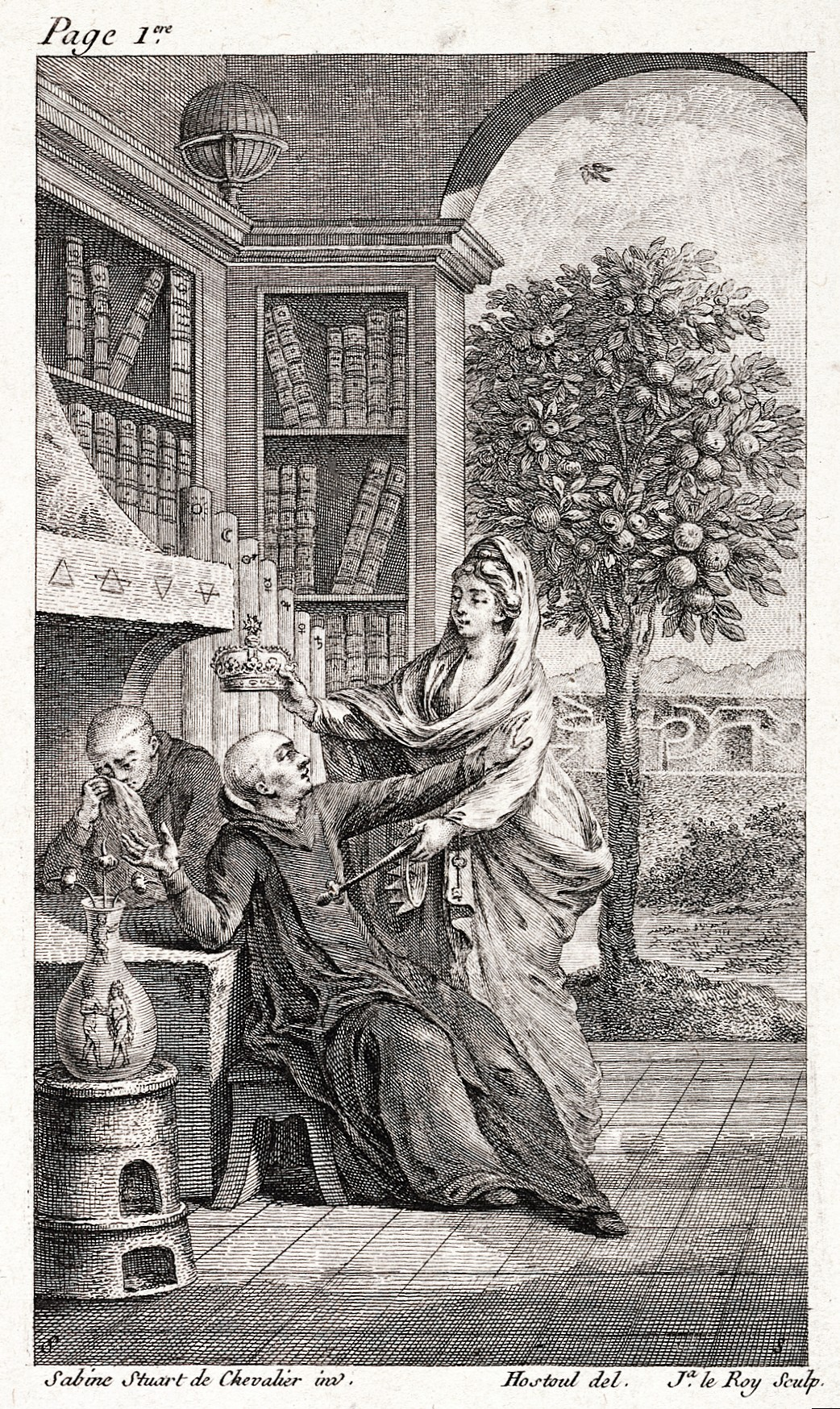
Engraving from Discours Philosophique

Sabine Stuart de Chevalier (fl. 1781) was a French alchemist and writer. She was the author of a work of alchemy, Discours Philosophique sur les Trois Principes, Animal, Vegetal and Mineral ou La Clef du Sanctuaire Philosophique (Paris, 1781), published in two volumes.

Stuart may have originally been from Scotland. She was married to Claude Chevalier, physician to the King of France and to the Cent-Suisses.

Like many alchemical texts, the language is highly allegorical. In the preface, Stuart writes that she received this "clef" in the form of lessons from her husband, and promises to explain The Twelve Keys of Philosophy, by famed alchemist Basilius Valentinus.

In 2026, German artist Anselm Kiefer included a painting of Stuart in his collection, The Women Alchemists, which was displayed in Milan's Sala delle Cariatidi as part of the cultural showcase of the 2026 Winter Olympics.
