= Obed Simon Johnson =

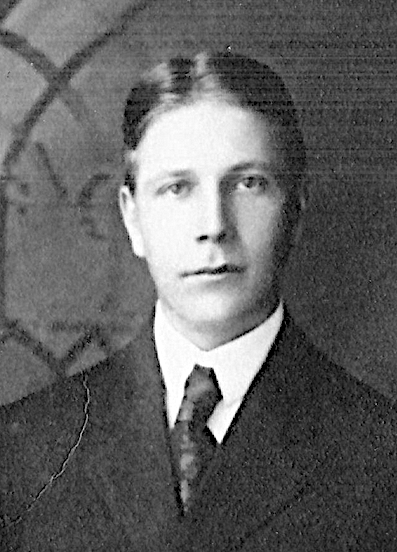
- Born: May 5, 1881; Lanyon, Iowa, US
- Died: October 12, 1970 (aged 89); Minneapolis, Minnesota, US
- Known for: Contributions to history of Chinese alchemy
- Spouse: Vida Maude Lowry (m. 1911)

Academic background
- Education: Carleton College Northfield, MN, B.A., Oberlin College, Oberlin OH, B.D., University of California Berkeley, CA, PhD

Academic work
- Discipline: Chinese language/history/culture
- Sub-discipline: Comparative mythology
- Institutions: University of California at Berkeley; Stanford University; Wabash College; North Park College
- Notable works: A Study of Chinese Alchemy (1928)

Obed Simon Johnson (May 5, 1881 – October 12, 1970) was an American academic, chaplain, congregational missionary and student of Chinese culture and history, known for A Study of Chinese Alchemy, which attributes the origin of alchemy to ancient China, rather than Greco-Egyptians 500 years later. He was the first Westerner to recognize the ancient Chinese alchemists.

Johnson was an early and pioneering sinologist. Johnson's contributions were translation, collation and synthesis of Chinese alchemy from many of the Chinese classics and books. He then made western scholars aware that one of the central tenets in chemistry, the elixir concept emerged far earlier in China than in Europe (i.e., w/ Roger Bacon). This is a key contribution to history in general and the history of science and chemistry in particular. He contributed important epistemological perspectives to the historical literature including Confucian and Taoist classics, books such as Chuang Tzu and Huai Nan Tzu, and dynastic histories in his seminal book “The Study of Chinese Alchemy” published in Shanghai in 1928. This book, which is referenced in The Hero With a Thousand Faces by Joseph Campbell, influenced Joseph Needham, Arthur Waley, Lynn Townsend White, Jr. and many other works on Chinese alchemy.

== Background and early life ==
Johnson was born in Lanyon, Iowa, in 1881. He received a B.S. in 1906 from Carleton College. Following a year each at seminaries at Oberlin, U. Chicago and North Park, Johnson left for China in 1909. Upon his return to the US in 1923 he studied at University of California at Berkeley receiving his PhD in 1925.

He was sponsored by the American Board of Commissioners for Foreign Missions to go to China as a missionary. There he met another missionary, Vida Lowrey. Obed and Vida were married in Shanghai and raised two children, James Waldemar and Johanna Dorothea. After fourteen years in Shanghai, learning the language, history and customs of China, they returned to the States, where he did two years of post-graduate work at the University of California at Berkeley.

At UC Berkeley, Johnson taught the language, history and civilization of China while taking advanced classes on Asia. His principal faculty adviser was Dr. Edward Thomas Williams with whom he shared a rural background; Johnson from rural Iowa, Williams from rural Ohio. Williams had gone to China in 1887 as a missionary. After nine years, Williams was appointed interpreter to the American Consul General in Shanghai. Williams later held other offices in the U.S. State Department before returning to the States to teach at the University of California at Berkeley. The two men had many experiences in common.

== China and Alchemy ==
While Johnson was a missionary in China, 1909-1923 he had translated several texts in Chinese on alchemy. This work became the foundation for his dissertation topic at UC Berkeley. The dissertation was published as "A Study of Chinese Alchemy". It was later translated to Chinese.

Obed Johnson wrote in his introduction that he was “especially interested in the supernatural beliefs of the Chinese and in the practices to which these beliefs gave rise.” As the two men discussed various dissertation topics, Williams suggested Chinese alchemy, to which Obed Johnson agreed. They outlined six chapters: “Taoism,” “The Changing Concept of Early Taoist Teaching,” “The Alchemy of Prolonging Life,” “The Alchemy of Transmuting Metals,” “Later Development of Chinese Alchemy,” and “Alchemy East and West.” The dissertation was published as a book, “A Study in Chinese Alchemy,” in Shanghai in 1928. Obed Johnson “hoped his study of Chinese alchemy may serve. . . to stimulate the interest aroused in Chinese Culture. . . and to add a modest contribution to the subject at hand. . . .”

The book was initially received with mixed reviews. An evaluation of Obed Johnson's book is found in Dr. Carmen Lee’s dissertation, “A Bibliographical Study of Western Publications on Traditional Chinese Science (1800-1985).”

Eminent sinologist Joseph Needham later wrote: “But by far the widest influence was exerted by the book of Obed Johnson finished in 1925 and printed in Shanghai three years later. The Study of Chinese Alchemy was based chiefly on what could be got from the Confucian and Taoist classics, and from books such as the Chuang Tzu and the Huai Nan Tzu, but it also made some use of the dynastic histories, showing clearly that while the elixir concept had been mightily prevalent during the Chhin and Han it did not manifest itself in European alchemy until the time of Roger Bacon and the incorporation of Arabic knowledge."

"After Johnson things were never quite the same. His work directly stimulated Arthur Waley . . . to make several contributions which raised the subject to a previously unattained level of scholarship. It also obliged the great synthesizers to take China seriously.”

Waley went on to write a supplement to Johnson's work.

In 1940 Roy C. Spooner took some of the most well-known Chinese alchemical writings and compared them with European alchemical texts, acknowledging that Johnson's book was "the source for much of my material."

Arthur Waley’s evaluation of Johnson's A Study of Chinese Alchemy: “This [is a] most important study on Chinese alchemy before the contributions by T.L. Davis and his collaborators. Discusses the question of the origins of alchemy, the first references in historical sources, the Zhouyi canton qi, the Baopu zi neipian, and the rise of neidan [internal alchemy].” Quoted in Fabrizio Pregadio, Chinese Alchemy: An Annotated Bibliography of Works in Western Languages, quoted from Arthur Waley

Lynn Tounsend White, Jr. said this about Johnson "... in the 1920s I too received much imprinting, not least while auditing Obed Johnson's pioneering lectures on Chinese alchemy".

== Joseph Campbell and The Hero With a Thousand Faces ==
Interviews with Joseph Campbell were popularized by Bill Moyers on the PBS Series, The Power of Myth. In The Hero with a Thousand Faces, Campbell quoted Johnson's translation of a Chinese preparation for achieving immortality: “Take three pounds of genuine cinnabar and one pound of white honey. Mix them. Dry the mixture in the sun. Then roast it over a fire until it can be shaped into pills. Take ten pills the size of a hemp seed every morning. Inside of a year, white hair will turn black, decayed teeth will grow again, and the body will become sleek and glistening. If an old man takes this medicine for a long time, he will develop into a young man. The one who takes it constantly will enjoy eternal life, and will not die.”

== See also ==
- Chinese Alchemy
- Joseph Campbell
- Lanyon, Iowa
- List of Protestant missionaries in China
- The Hero With A Thousand Faces
- Waidan
