= Master Geng =

Chinese alchemist

Master Geng (Chinese: 耿先生; pinyin: Gěng Xiānshēng; Wade–Giles: Kêng^{3} Hsien^{1}-shêng^{1}, fl. c. 975) was a Chinese alchemist, and the daughter of Geng Qian.

Legend says that during her adolescence, she already demonstrated her intelligence, curiosity, and developed skills in the alchemical arts. Eventually, her skills drew the attention of emperor Xuanzong, who invited her to the palace. Within the palace, rather than being counted as one of the palace women, she was honoured as a scholar, and given the title Master (or Teacher). Whenever she had an audience, she spoke confidently and eloquently, always wearing green robes. She is described as performing alchemical transformations, as well as dabbling in divination.

Most of her alchemy focused on creating silver, and tales tell of her ability to use mercury to turn even snow into silver. This, some modern chemists have proposed, might be an example of a legitimate chemical process in which mercury is used to extract silver from ores. She may have also distilled perfumes, and utilized an early form of the Soxhlet process to extract camphor into alcohol. In her personal life, Geng was noted as enjoying wine, and romantic and sexual dalliances.
