= Jeanne du Port =

Jeanne du Port (née Duchesne; after 1574 – after 1647) was the daughter of French alchemist Joseph Duchesne (known as Quercetan), and possibly an accomplished Paracelsian alchemist in her own right. She is remembered for a group of alchemical treatises called "Quercitan's daughter's letters", written in the first half of the 17th century and attributed variously to "Quercitan's daughter", "Mr. de Chenis Quercitan's daughter", "Neptis" (meaning female descendant), or, more vaguely, "a learned woman of France". Although the author has sometimes been identified as Madame de la Martinville, who collaborated with Duchesne and whom he once called his "spiritual daughter", some or all of the letters were probably written by du Port, Duchesne's literal daughter.

Two of the documents tentatively attributed to du Port are English translations of excerpts from the Rosarium philosophorum. These are the earliest known English translations of those sections of the 16th-century alchemical treatise, and demonstrate her adeptness with words and metaphor.

Jeanne du Chesne's parents were Joseph Duchesne and Anne de Trye, French Calvinists living in exile in Geneva, who had married in 1574. Sometime before 1604, she married a minor noble and municipal magistrate Pierre du Port. They had three children: Joseph (1604), Jean (1608), and Suzanne (1613). In 1647, she was reported to be widowed and living in Geneva.
