= Třebsko =

- Municipality
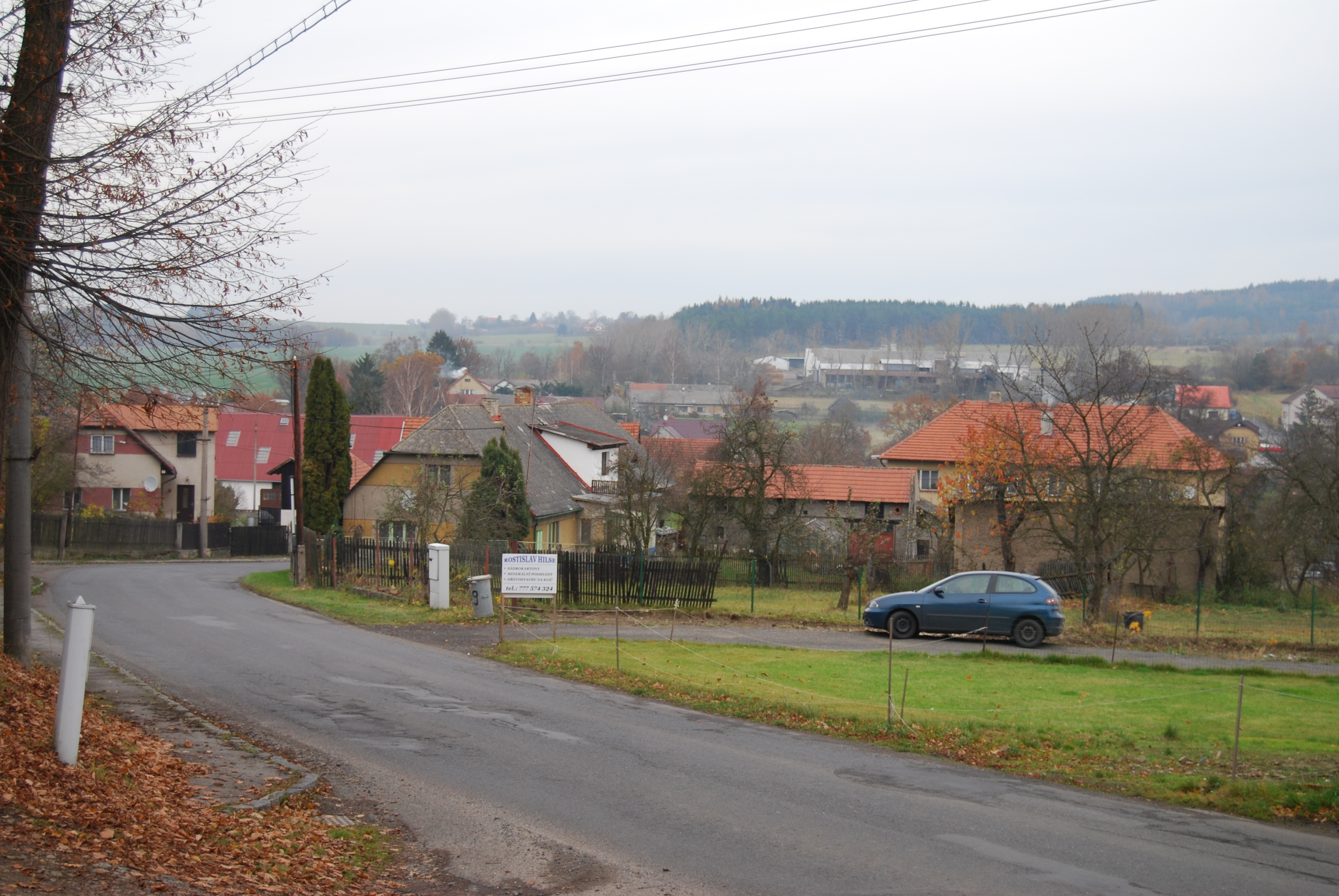
- General view

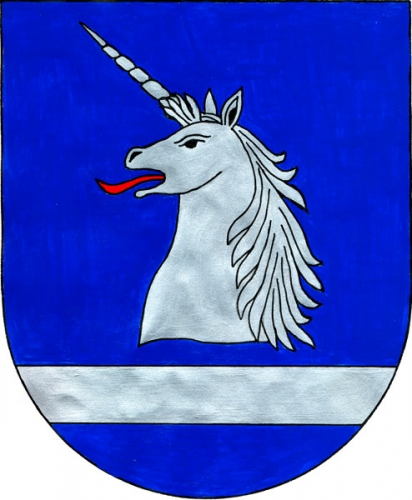
- Flag Coat of arms

- Location in the Czech Republic
- Coordinates: 49°37′33″N 13°58′3″E
- Country: Czech Republic
- Region: Central Bohemian
- District: Příbram
- First mentioned: 1352

Area
  - Total: 3.48 km^{2} (1.34 sq mi)
- Elevation: 533 m (1,749 ft)

Population (2026-01-01)
  - Total: 282
  - Density: 81.0/km^{2} (210/sq mi)
- Time zone: UTC+1 (CET)
  - Summer (DST): UTC+2 (CEST)
- Postal code: 262 42
- Website: www.trebsko.cz

Třebsko (Czech pronunciation: [ˈtr̝̊ɛpsko]) is a municipality and village in Příbram District in the Central Bohemian Region of the Czech Republic. It has about 300 inhabitants.

== Demographics ==
Historical population
| Year | Pop. | ±% |
|---|---|---|
| 1869 | 362 | — |
| 1880 | 363 | +0.3% |
| 1890 | 416 | +14.6% |
| 1900 | 424 | +1.9% |
| 1910 | 377 | −11.1% |
| 1921 | 327 | −13.3% |
| 1930 | 306 | −6.4% |
| 1950 | 206 | −32.7% |
| 1961 | 218 | +5.8% |
| 1970 | 202 | −7.3% |
| 1980 | 209 | +3.5% |
| 1991 | 198 | −5.3% |
| 2001 | 202 | +2.0% |
| 2011 | 228 | +12.9% |
| 2021 | 267 | +17.1% |
Source: Censuses
