= Fang (alchemist) =

Earliest recorded woman alchemist in China

Fang (Chinese: 方), was a Chinese scientist and alchemist who lived during the first century B.C during the Han dynasty. She was the earliest recorded woman alchemist in China.

She is only known under her family name Fang. Raised in a scholarly family skilled in the alchemical arts, she studied alchemy with one of the Emperor Han Wudi's spouses and thus had access to the highest levels of society. Fang's husband was Cheng Wei (simplified Chinese: 程伟; traditional Chinese: 程偉). She accomplished feats her husband could not.

Fang was credited with the discovery of the method to turn mercury into silver. It was believed that she may have used the chemical technique of silver extraction from ores using mercury, where pure silver residue is left behind from the boiled mercury.

According to the account by Ge Hong, after Fang demonstrated her ability to transform mercury into silver, Cheng Wei became obsessed with obtaining the secret. He first tried to coax the formula from her through persuasion and lavish gifts, selling off his land and houses to provide her with fine food and clothing. When this failed, he conspired with companions to beat her with a cane. Fang, forewarned of his plans, refused to divulge the method, insisting that the Way must only be transmitted to a person of virtue — not to one whose "mouth says yes but heart says no." Cheng Wei, however, continued to coerce her relentlessly. Under this unceasing pressure, Fang eventually went insane, stripped off her clothes and ran into the streets, smeared herself with mud, and died.
