= Basset Jhones =

Welsh alchemist, medical doctor and grammarian

Bassett Jhones

Basset Jhones (sometimes recorded as Basset Jones) (born 1613 or 1614, date of death unknown) was a Welsh alchemist, medical doctor and grammarian.

== Life ==
Jhones, who was born in 1613 or 1614, was the son of Richard Jones of Michaelston-super-Ely in Glamorgan, South Wales. He is said to have studied at the University of Oxford in 1634, as a member of Jesus College, before travelling abroad and studying in Paris, before matriculating at the University of Leiden in March 1638 and at the University of Franeker in May 1638, on both occasions as a medical student. Although he was to style himself as "Dr", it does not appear that either Leiden or Franeker awarded him a degree.

After returning to Britain, he published Lapis chymicus philosophorum examini subjectus in 1648, also writing an unpublished version of the work in verse (in English). The book came to the attention of Samuel Hartlib, who described it in January 1655 as a "very choice and rare Booke discovering the whole Philosophical Mystery". Hartlib was told about the book by a German alchemist, Frederick Clodius, who said that the book was scarce as the copies were being bought up. Jhones met Clodius in February 1655 and said that he had an elixir that would cure all fevers. Jones was later reported to be conducting alchemical experiments.

In 1659, he completed a grammar book (Hermaelogium, or, An Essay at the Rationality of the Art of Speaking) which was published in London, receiving the approval of William Dugard, the headmaster of Merchant Taylors' School. He was reported to be carrying on his work, "filled afresh with very great expectations", in November 1659, but nothing is known for certain of him after this.
