= Francesco Amico =

Catholic theologian

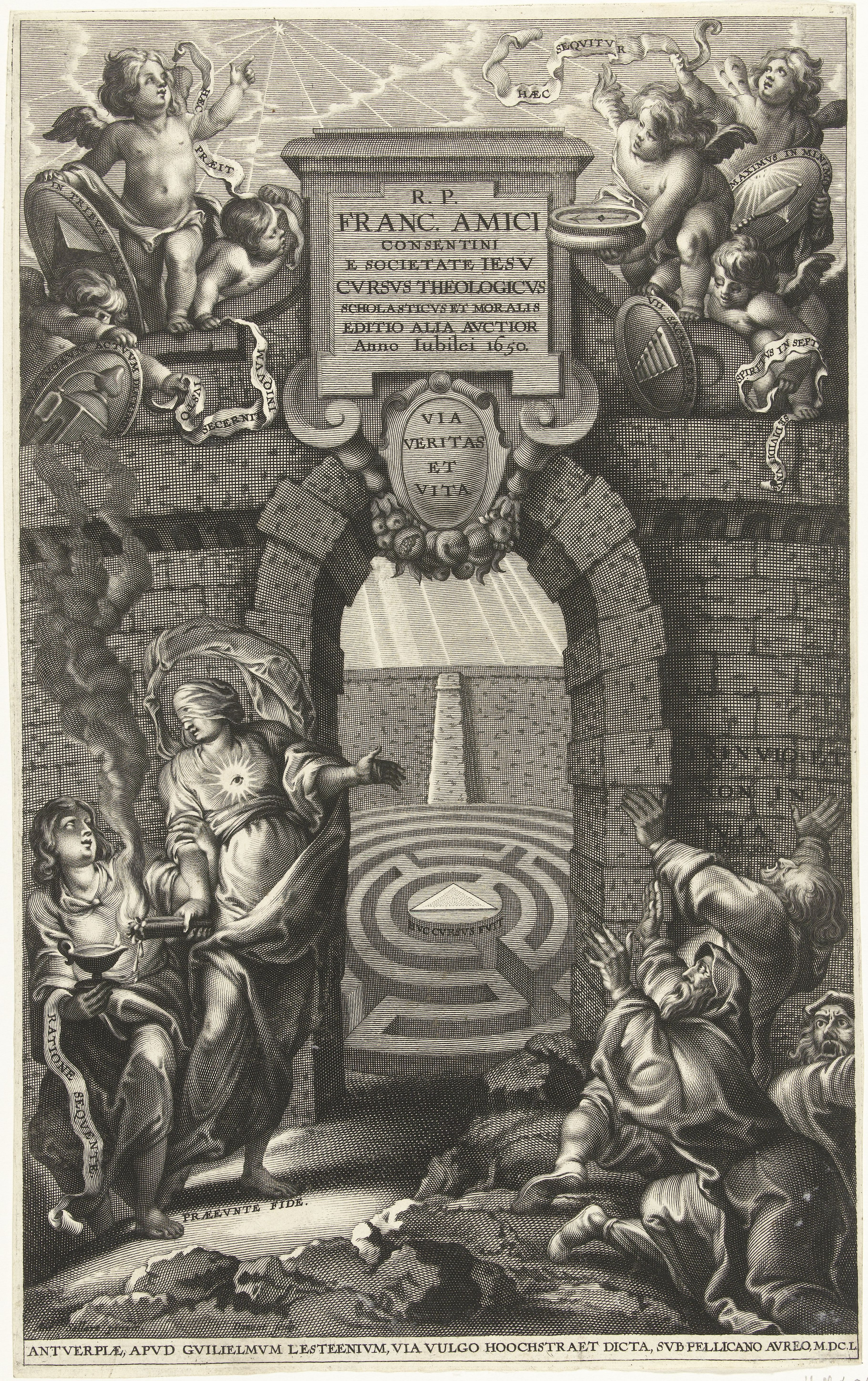
Francesco Amico, Cursus Theologicus scholasticus et moralis, Antwerpen, Willem Lesteens, 1650.

Francesco Amico SJ was a prominent Catholic theologian, born in Cosenza, Calabria, 2 April 1578.

== Biography ==
Francesco Amico entered the Society of Jesus in 1596. For twenty-four years, he was professor of theology at Naples, Aquila, and Gratz, and, for five years, chancellor in the academy of Gratz. He was scholastic in his method, adapting his treatises to a four-year course of teaching. He wrote De Deo Uno et Trino; De Natura Angelorum; De Ultimo Fine; De Fide, Spe, et Charitate; De Justitia et Jure, which was prohibited, 18 June 1651 donec corrigatur, on account of three propositions in it, which Pope Alexander VII and Innocent XI objected to. The corrected edition of 1649 was permitted. He wrote also on the Incarnation, and the sacraments.
