= Kadlín =

- Municipality
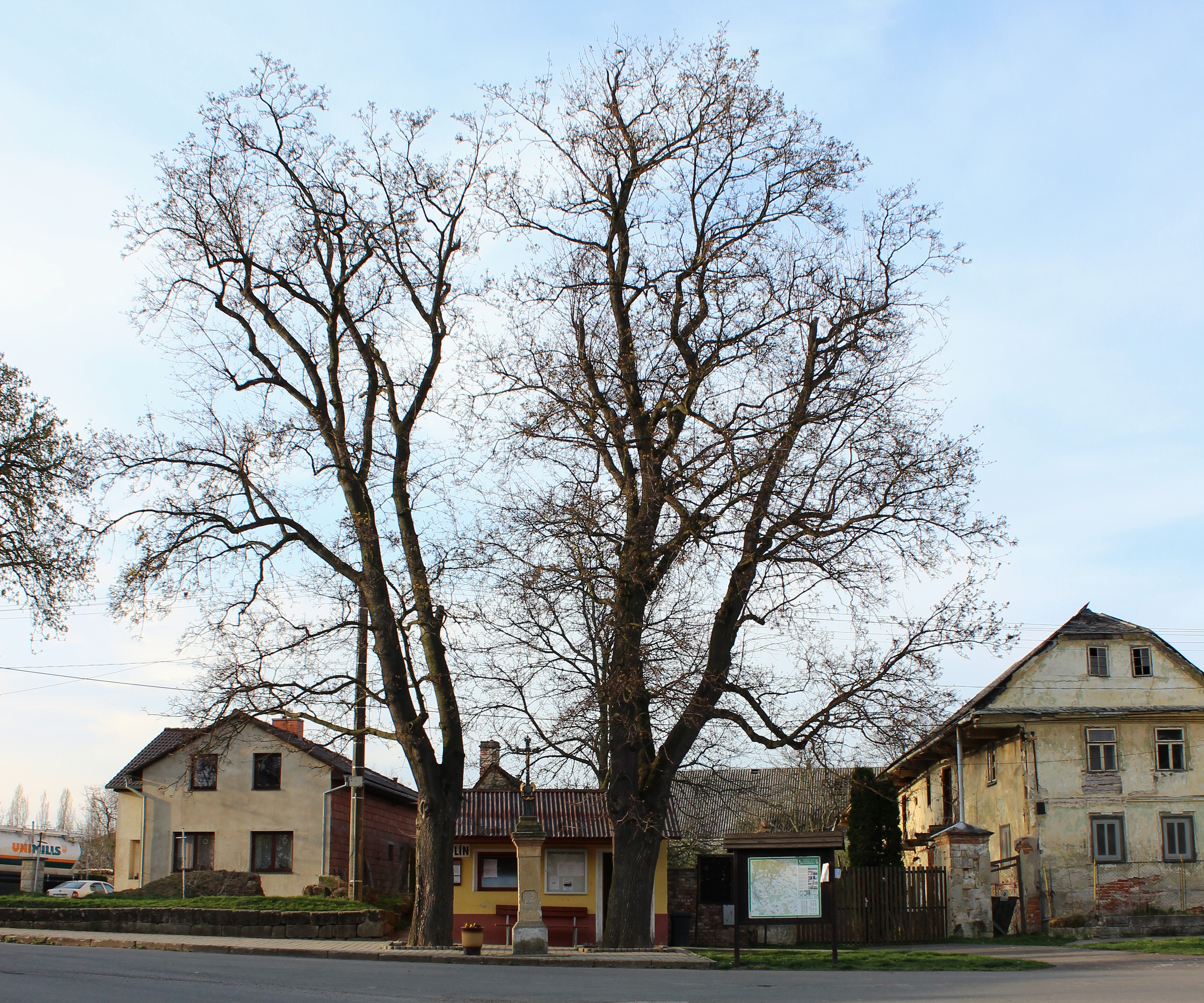
- Centre of Kadlín

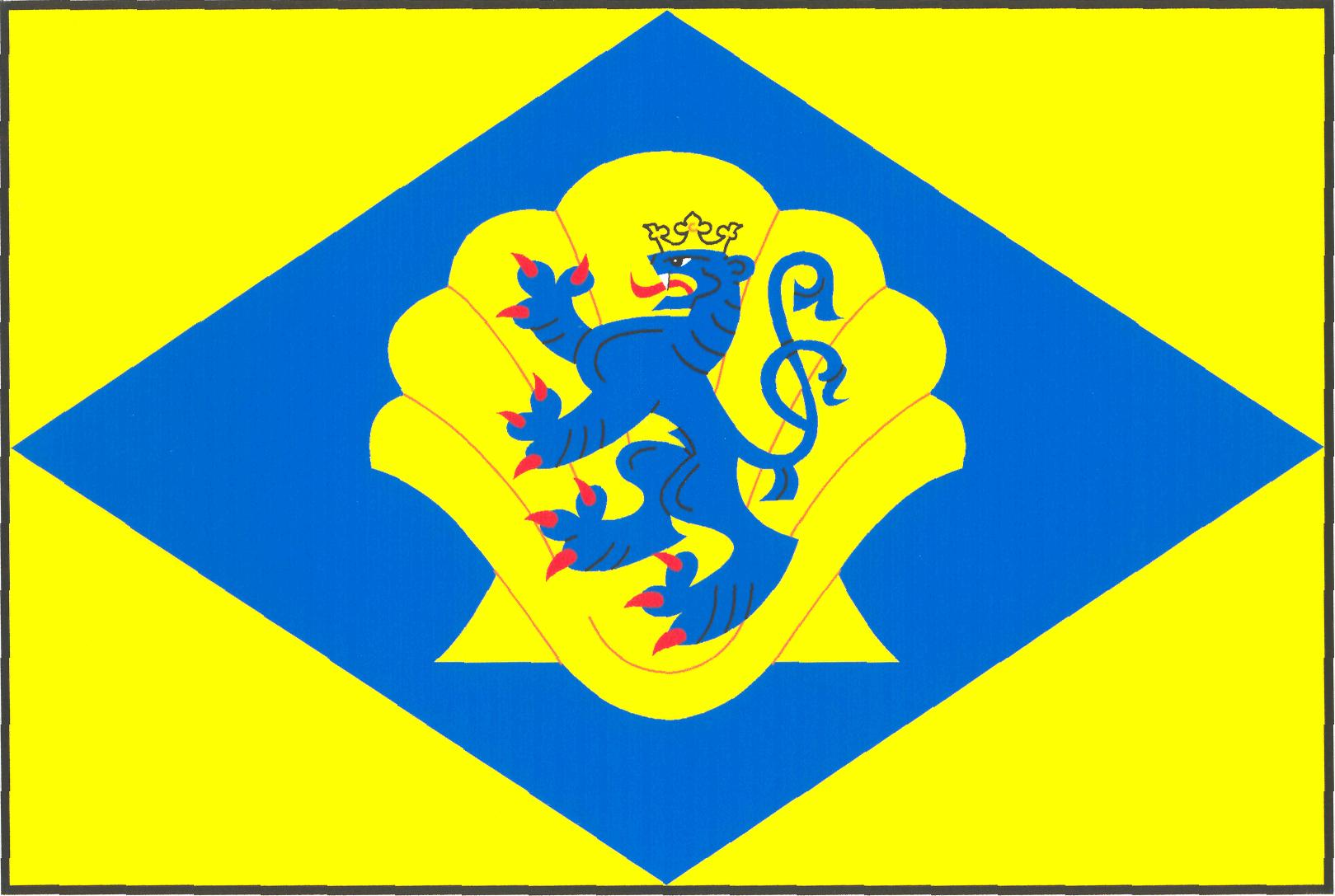
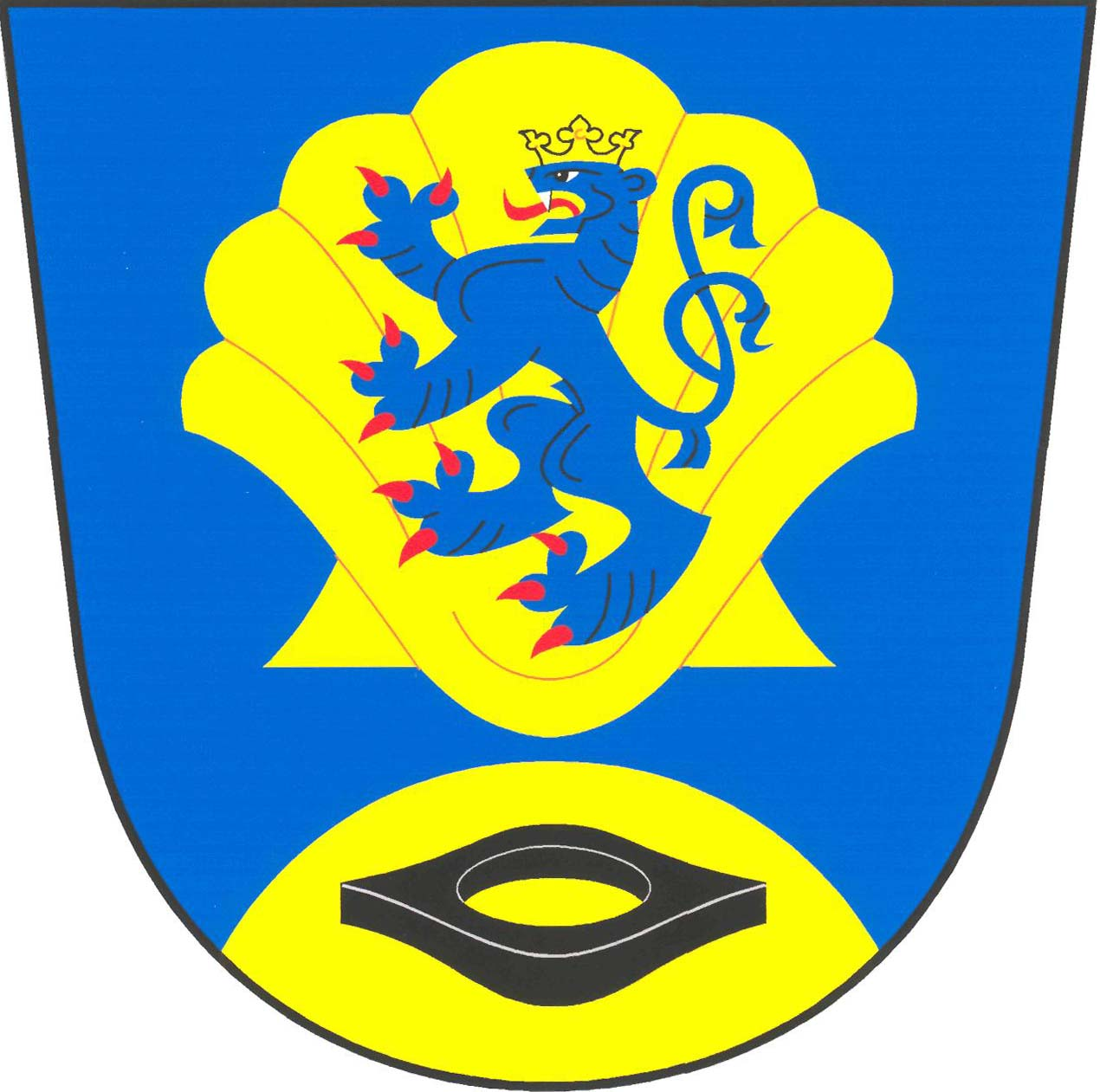
- Flag Coat of arms

- Location in the Czech Republic
- Coordinates: 50°23′58″N 14°41′59″E
- Country: Czech Republic
- Region: Central Bohemian
- District: Mělník
- First mentioned: 1346

Area
  - Total: 6.81 km^{2} (2.63 sq mi)
- Elevation: 296 m (971 ft)

Population (2026-01-01)
  - Total: 149
  - Density: 21.9/km^{2} (56.7/sq mi)
- Time zone: UTC+1 (CET)
  - Summer (DST): UTC+2 (CEST)
- Postal code: 277 35
- Website: www.kadlin.cz

Kadlín is a municipality and village in Mělník District in the Central Bohemian Region of the Czech Republic. It has about 100 inhabitants.

== Administrative division ==
Kadlín consists of two municipal parts (in brackets population according to the 2021 census):

- Kadlín (125)
- Ledce (20)

== Etymology ==
The name was probably derived from tkáti, tkadlec, i.e. 'to weave', 'weaver'. It was probably originally a weavers' settlement.

== Geography ==
Kadlín is located about 16 kilometres (10 mi) northeast of Mělník and 15 km (9 mi) west of Mladá Boleslav. It lies in the Jizera Table. The highest point is the Hradiště hill at 314 m (1,030 ft) above sea level.

== History ==
The first written mention of Kadlín is from 1346. Among the notable owners of the village were Hynek Berka of Dubá, Augustinian monastery in Bělá pod Bezdězem and Emperor Rudolf II. In 1445, the territory of the village was divided, and until 1849 the two parts were administered separately and had different owners.

== Demographics ==
Historical population

Year	Pop.	±%
1869	316	—
1880	331	+4.7%
1890	387	+16.9%
1900	416	+7.5%
1910	441	+6.0%

Year	Pop.	±%
1921	447	+1.4%
1930	438	−2.0%
1950	276	−37.0%
1961	280	+1.4%
1970	230	−17.9%

Year	Pop.	±%
1980	211	−8.3%
1991	152	−28.0%
2001	131	−13.8%
2011	134	+2.3%
2021	145	+8.2%

Source: Censuses

== Transport ==
There are no railways or major roads passing through the municipality.

== Sights ==
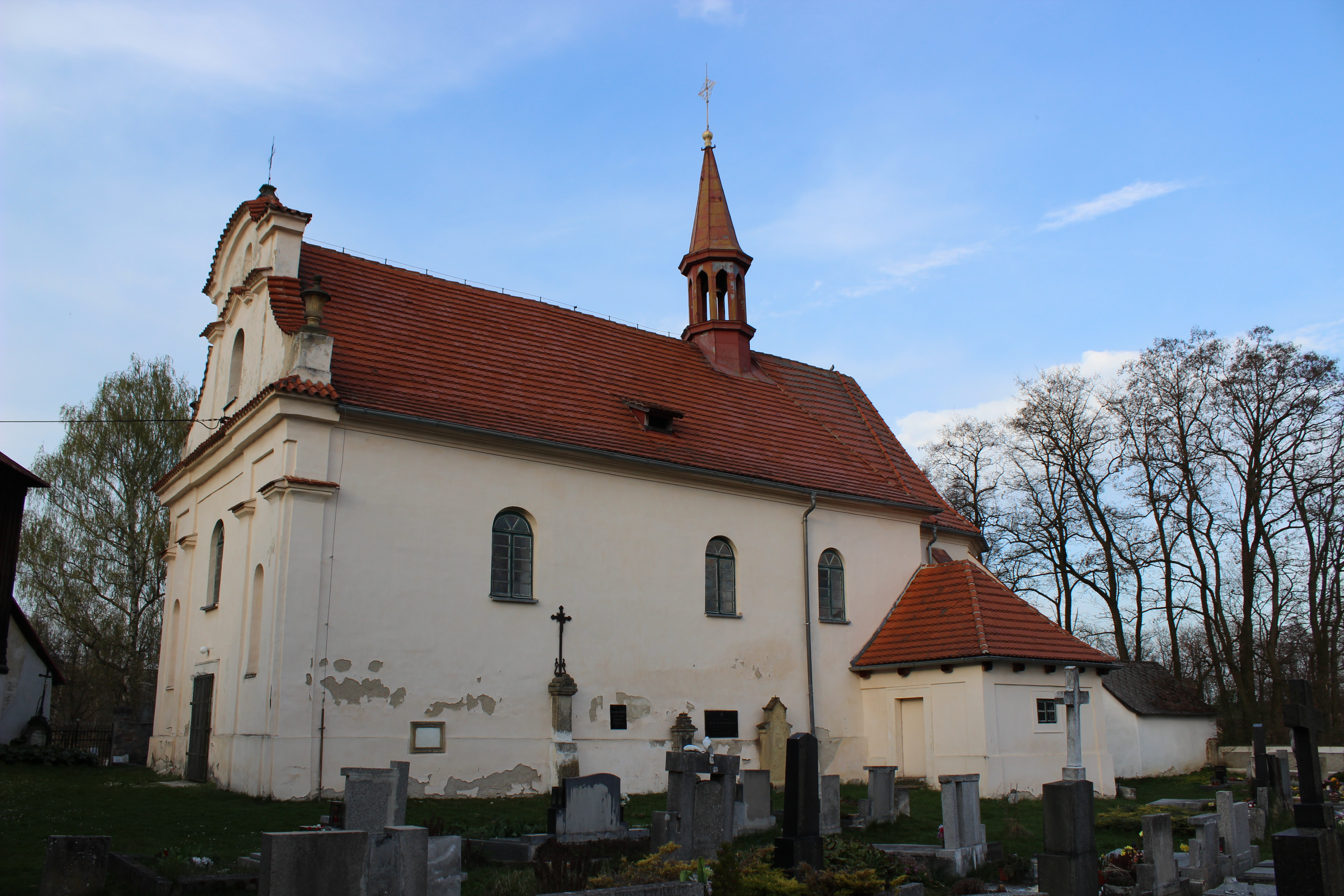
Church of Saint James the Great

The main landmark of Kadlín is the Church of Saint James the Great. It was first mentioned in 1384. The original Gothic church was rebuilt in the Baroque style in 1724.

The local municipal museum focuses on rural themes and includes an exhibition with rural technology, blacksmith's work, a collection of hoes and local field crops.

On the hill Hradiště is an observation tower. It was built in 2006 in the shape of a watchtower and its height is 19 metres (62 ft).
