= Madame d'Orbelin =

Chemist

Madame d'Orbelin was a chemist from Vienna who claimed to have discovered a technique to render mercury into a solid at room temperature in the 18th century. Referred to as "The Alchemiste" by Benjamin Franklin, d'Orberlin is a late example of an amateur scientist whose work straddled alchemy ("fixing mercury") and the 18th-century "chemical revolution".

D'Orbelin wrote to Benjamin Franklin three times in 1785, and evidently demonstrated her technique to him in Paris on 26 March of that year. She subsequently reported that she had published her results, and asked Franklin for a small loan. Although none of d'Orbelin's published works are known to have survived, the American Philosophical Society's Franklin archive does include undated instructions, written in French and in another's handwriting, for an experiment involving antimony and saltpeter.

Her claim was well-enough known that her discovery of "malleable mercury" was published as fact by a number of sources in subsequent decades, including by Thomas Tegg (1835) and George Palmer Putnam (1851).

In 2026, German artist Anselm Kiefer included a painting of d'Orbelin in his collection, The Women Alchemists, which was displayed in Milan's Sala delle Cariatidi as part of the cultural showcase of the 2026 Winter Olympics.
