= Frau von Pfuel =

Alchemist

Frau von Pfuel is the name given to an alchemist who visited the Prussian Court in 1751.

Although Frederick the Great was generally skeptical of alchemy, in 1751 he welcomed a woman known as Frau von Pfuel, or Madame von Pfuel, and her two daughters into his court in Potsdam, on the recommendation of his adviser, Michael Gabriel Fredersdorf. Claiming that she could "extract the soul of gold", Frederick accepted her offer to perform the experiment in front of him so that he could "expose the folly" under his own "strict surveillance". Unable to detect any fraud, the king provided the trio with at least ten thousand thalers of gold with which to repeat their process. But rather than increasing the quantity of gold, Theodor Wolff recorded that von Pfuel and her daughters had, in fact, embezzled fifty ducats of the precious metal.

She is not known to have left any written records of her techniques.

In 2026, German artist Anselm Kiefer included a painting of von Pfuel in his collection, The Women Alchemists, which was displayed in Milan's Sala delle Cariatidi as part of the cultural showcase of the 2026 Winter Olympics.
