= Ledce (Mladá Boleslav District) =

- Municipality
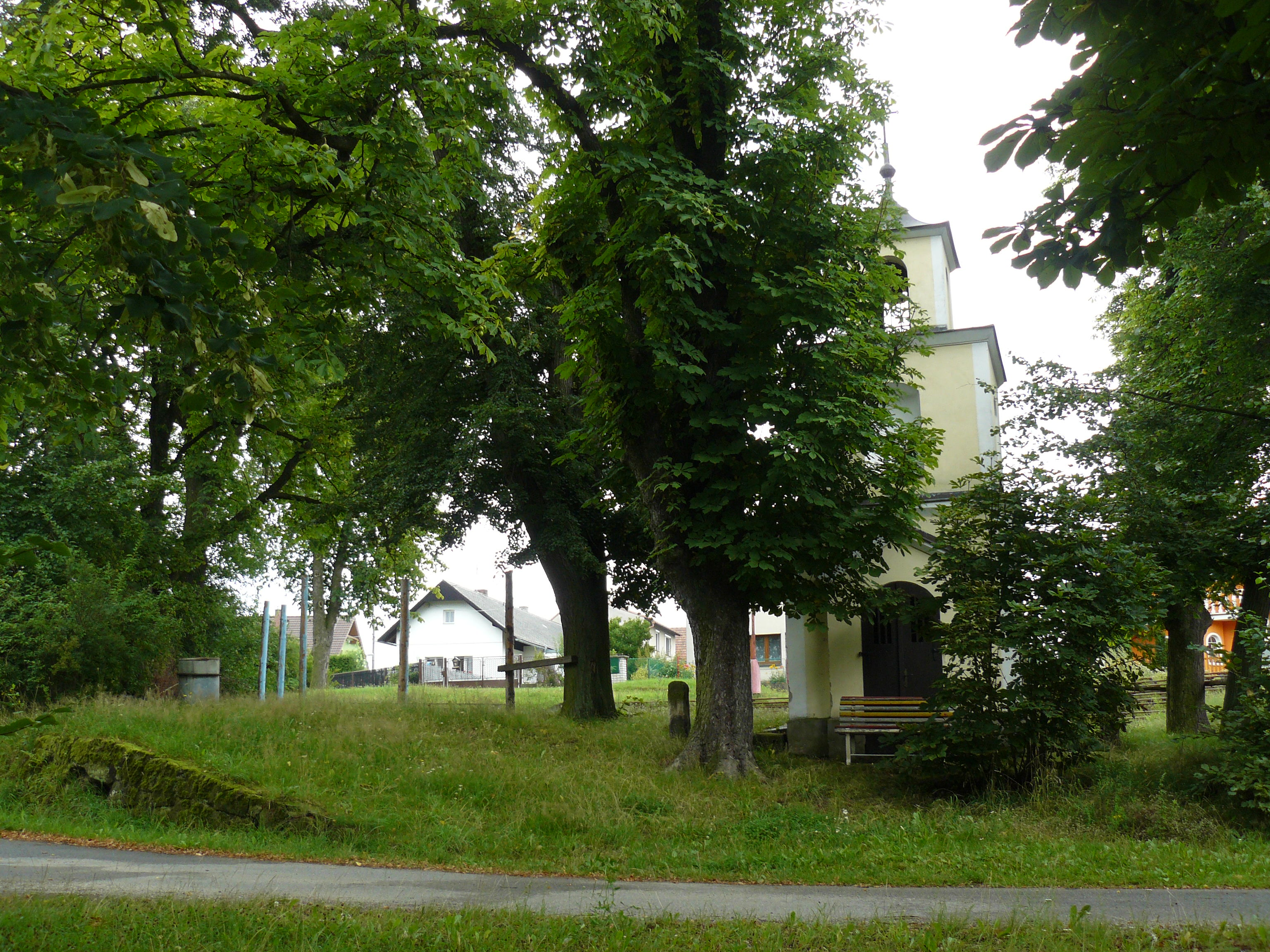
- Chapel of Our Lady of Mount Carmel

- Location in the Czech Republic
- Coordinates: 50°21′22″N 15°4′56″E
- Country: Czech Republic
- Region: Central Bohemian
- District: Mladá Boleslav
- First mentioned: 1249

Area
  - Total: 8.66 km^{2} (3.34 sq mi)
- Elevation: 260 m (850 ft)

Population (2026-01-01)
  - Total: 413
  - Density: 47.7/km^{2} (124/sq mi)
- Time zone: UTC+1 (CET)
  - Summer (DST): UTC+2 (CEST)
- Postal code: 294 47
- Website: obecledce.cz

Ledce is a municipality and village in Mladá Boleslav District in the Central Bohemian Region of the Czech Republic. It has about 400 inhabitants.

== Etymology ==
The old Czech word ledce originated as a diminutive of the word lado, which denoted unploughed land.

== Geography ==
Ledce is located about 13 kilometres (8 mi) southeast of Mladá Boleslav and 48 km (30 mi) northeast of Prague. It lies mostly in the Jizera Table, but it also extends into the Jičín Uplands in the north. The highest point is at 294 m (965 ft) above sea level. The Vlkava River flows through the municipality. The municipal territory is rich in small fishponds.

== History ==
The first written mention of Ledce is from 1249. Until the Thirty Years' War, it was a large village with a fortress, but during the war, the fortress was destroyed and more than half of the population died.

== Demographics ==
Historical population

Year	Pop.	±%
1869	391	—
1880	366	−6.4%
1890	360	−1.6%
1900	366	+1.7%
1910	399	+9.0%

Year	Pop.	±%
1921	390	−2.3%
1930	398	+2.1%
1950	303	−23.9%
1961	314	+3.6%
1970	286	−8.9%

Year	Pop.	±%
1980	309	+8.0%
1991	336	+8.7%
2001	302	−10.1%
2011	346	+14.6%
2021	386	+11.6%

Source: Censuses

== Transport ==
There are no railways or major roads passing through the municipality.

== Sights ==
There are no protected cultural monuments in the municipality. A landmark in the centre of Ledce is the Chapel of Our Lady of Mount Carmel.
