= Martin Ruland the Elder =

German physician and alchemist (1532–1602)

Martin Ruland the Elder.

Martin Ruland the Elder (1532, in Freising – 3 February 1602), also known as Martinus Rulandus or Martin Rulandt, was a German physician, alchemist and classical philologist. He was a follower of the physician Paracelsus.

Ruland was born as the son of the pharmacist Balthasar Ruland (1489-1534). After completing his studies, he initially worked as a balneologist in Giengen. From around 1565, Ruland taught pharmacology, physics and Greek at the Gymnasium Illustre (now Albertus-Gymnasium) in Lauingen as professor publicus. He also practised in Lauingen as the city physician and personal physician to Count palatine Philipp Ludwig.

In his function as personal physician to Emperor Rudolf II, Ruland later moved to Prague where he stayed until his death in 1602. Fragments of his tombstone were used in the construction of Lauingen's fortified tower at Oberanger, which are still visible today.

Ruland had six known descendants. Four of his sons also became doctors. His son Martin Ruland the Younger (1569–1611) also became a renowned physician and alchemist.

Presumably the elder of the two published "Centuries" of cures titled "Curationum empiricarum et historicarum Centuria" in 10 volumes from 1578 to 1596 in Basel.

== Works ==
Ruland's writings are rooted in the alchemical views of his time. He mostly used antimony-containing emetics as remedies. His antimony potassium tartrate-based emetic (aqua benedicta rulandi or Ruland's water) became well known and was found in pharmacopoeias until the 19th century.

Ruland is considered to be the first person to describe the clinical symptoms of Rolandic epilepsy (1597), which was not named after him but after the Italian anatomist Luigi Rolando, despite the similarity in name.

In addition to his medical activities, Ruland wrote medical texts on bloodletting and cupping as well as balneological applications of water for diseases. He also published writings on the Greek language, such as the frequently published Dictionarium latino-graecum sive synonymorum copia.

A lexicon of alchemy written by his son Ruland the Younger was often attributed to Ruland the Elder.

== Writings ==
- Medicina practica recens et nova. Straßburg 1564.
- Curationum empiricarum et historicarum centuriae X. Basel 1578.
