= Jean Dubuis =

- Born: April 29, 1919; Vauciennes
- Died: April 6, 2010; France

Jean Dubuis (April 29, 1919 – April 6, 2010) was a renowned 20th-century French esotericist, qabalist, and alchemist.

== Les Philosophes de la Nature ==
In 1995, a controversial parliamentary commission of the National Assembly of France on cults produced its report. The report included Les Philosophes de la Nature as a sectarian movement of between 50 and 500 adepts.

In 1999, the association was legally dissolved since Dubuis said that it had strayed from its core principles. The sister organization in the United States was also disbanded, and all further dissemination of material continued online.

== Later works ==
In his final years, Dubuis focused his works on electronic devices to achieve initiation.

The last lecture on electronic devices was given in September 2004 in French. Dubuis explains the different sound frequencies to use for initiation.

Other lectures explain in more detail the operation of electronic machines (in French) and a software simulating these machines has been published in 2006.

The dissemination of his works in French and English is carried on by the legally registered Portae Lucis association in France.

== Writings ==
- Book I: The Fundamentals of Esoteric Knowledge, Lessons 1-12
- Book II: Spagyrics, Lessons 1-48
- Book III: Mineral Alchemy, Lessons 1-84
- Book IV: Qabalah, 1-72

Dubuis' final work and only published treatise was published in 2007.

- Book V: The Experience of Eternity

== In popular culture ==
Jean Dubuis appeared in the History Channel documentary Discovering The Real World of Harry Potter.
