= Rosary of the Philosophers =

16th-century alchemical treatise

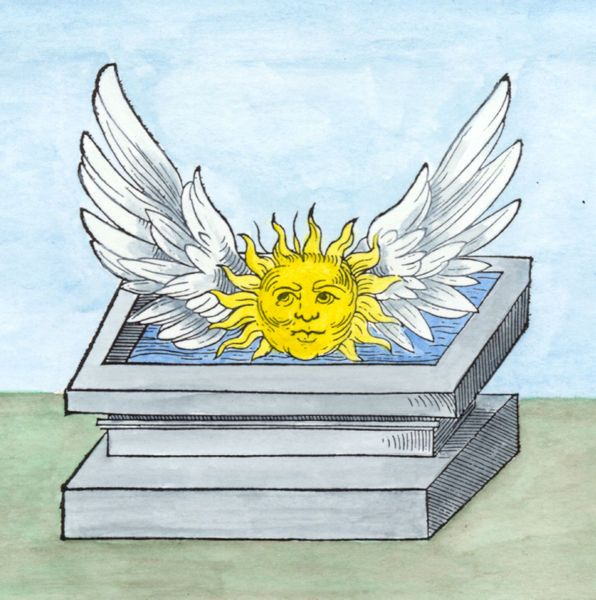
Woodcut illustrating the illuminatio stage, captioned "Here Sol plainly dies again, And is drowned with the Mercury of the Philosophers."

The Rosary of the Philosophers (Rosarium philosophorum sive pretiosissimum donum Dei) is a 16th-century alchemical treatise. It was published in 1550 as part II of De Alchimia Opuscula complura veterum philosophorum (Frankfurt). The term rosary in the title is unrelated to the Catholic prayer beads; it refers to a "rose garden", metaphoric of an anthology or collection of wise sayings.

The 1550 print includes a series of 20 woodcuts with German-language captions, plus a title page showing a group of philosophers disputing about the production of the lapis philosophorum. Some of the woodcut images have precedents in earlier (15th-century) German alchemical literature, especially in the Buch der heiligen Dreifaltigkeit (ca. 1410) which has the direct precedents of woodcuts 10, 17 and 19, allegorical of the complete hieros gamos, nrs. 10 and 17 in the form of the "Hermetic androgyne" and nr. 19 in terms of Christian iconography, showing Mary flanked by the Father, Son and Holy Spirit.

The Artis auriferae, printed in 1572 in Basel, reproduced the 20 illustrations as re-cut woodcuts. Johann Daniel Mylius' Philosophia reformata of 1622 also includes the twenty Rosarium images, re-designed in early 17th-century style by Balthazar Swan.

== Manuscripts ==
The Latin text also survives in numerous manuscripts, none of them predating the 1550 print edition.

- late 16th century
  - Glasgow University Library MS. Ferguson 6.
  - British Library Sloane MS 2560.
  - British Library Add MS 29895.
  - Bodleian Library MS. Ashmole 1487.
  - Paris, Bibliothèque Nationale MS. Lat. 7171.
  - Biblioteca Apostolica Vaticana MS. Reg. Lat. 1278.
  - Gotha, Forschungsbibliothek MS. Chart. B. 365.
  - Darmstadt, Hessiche Landesbibliothek MS. 1049.
  - Kassel, Landesbibliothek MS. 2° Chym. 21.
  - Kassel, Landesbibliothek MS. 4° Chym. 81.
  - Nürnberg, Germanisches Nationalmuseum MS. 16752. [8vo. NW 1482.]
  - Leiden MS. Vossianus Chym. F. 12. (dated 1575)
  - Rome, Biblioteca dell'Accademia dei Lincei. MS. Verginelli-Rota 6 (dated 1597)
  - Marburg MS. 101. (c. 1600)
- 17th century
  - Glasgow University Library MS. Ferguson 96.
  - Glasgow University Library MS. Ferguson 149.
  - Getty Center. Manly Palmer Hall MS. 232.
  - St. Gallen, Bibliothek Vadiana MS. 394 a.
  - St. Gallen, Bibliothek Vadiana MS. 394 b.
- 18th century
  - Glasgow University Library MS. Ferguson 210.
  - Glasgow University Library MS. Ferguson 29.
  - Glasgow University Library MS. Ferguson 74.
  - Getty Center. Manly Palmer Hall MS. 49.
  - Bibliotheca Philosophica Hermetica MS. 86.
- 19th century
  - Bibliotheca Philosophica Hermetica MS. 219.
  - Bibliotheca Philosophica Hermetica MS. 303.
- London, Wellcome Library MS. 1091.
- London, Wellcome Library MS. 4256.

== Translations ==
Two excerpts from the Rosary were translated into English by a pseudonymous woman—likely Jeanne du Port—in the early 17th century.

The text of MS Ferguson 210, in Glasgow University Library, is the basis of an English translation that was published in the 18th century. The English translation reproduces the coloured drawings of the Ferguson MS as woodcuts.

There is also a Czech translation, dated to 1578, by Jaroš Griemiller, kept in the National Library of Prague, Czech Republic. The Czech manuscript reproduces the illustrations as line drawings.
