= Martin Ruland the Younger =

German physician and alchemist (1569–1611)

Title page of Lexicon alchemiae (1612)

Martin Ruland the Younger (11 November 1569 – 23 April 1611), also known as Martinus Rulandus or Martin Rulandt, was a German physician and alchemist.

He was born in the Bavarian town of Lauingen, the son of the physician and alchemist Martin Ruland the Elder.

Ruland the Younger practiced at Regensburg during the 1590s, becoming city physician in 1594. He later practiced at Prague, where he belonged to Emperor Rudolf II's retinue at the Habsburg court which during Rudolf's reign promoted the study of alchemy and astrology. Rudolf II conferred nobility upon Ruland the Younger in 1608.

Ruland's 1612 Lexicon alchemiae ('Dictionary of Alchemy') is cited by the Swiss psychologist Carl Jung in his writings on alchemy. Waite translated the book into the English language.

Ruland the Younger was also the editor of his father's works.

== Books ==
- Lapidis philosophici vera conficiendi ratio ("The True Method for Completing the Philosopher's Stone") (1606)
- "Defence of Alchemy" (1607)
- Progymnasmata alchemiae sive problemata chymica (1607)
- Lexicon alchemiae sive dictionarium alchemisticum ("Dictionary of Alchemy") (1612)
