= Ledce (Brno-Country District) =

- Municipality
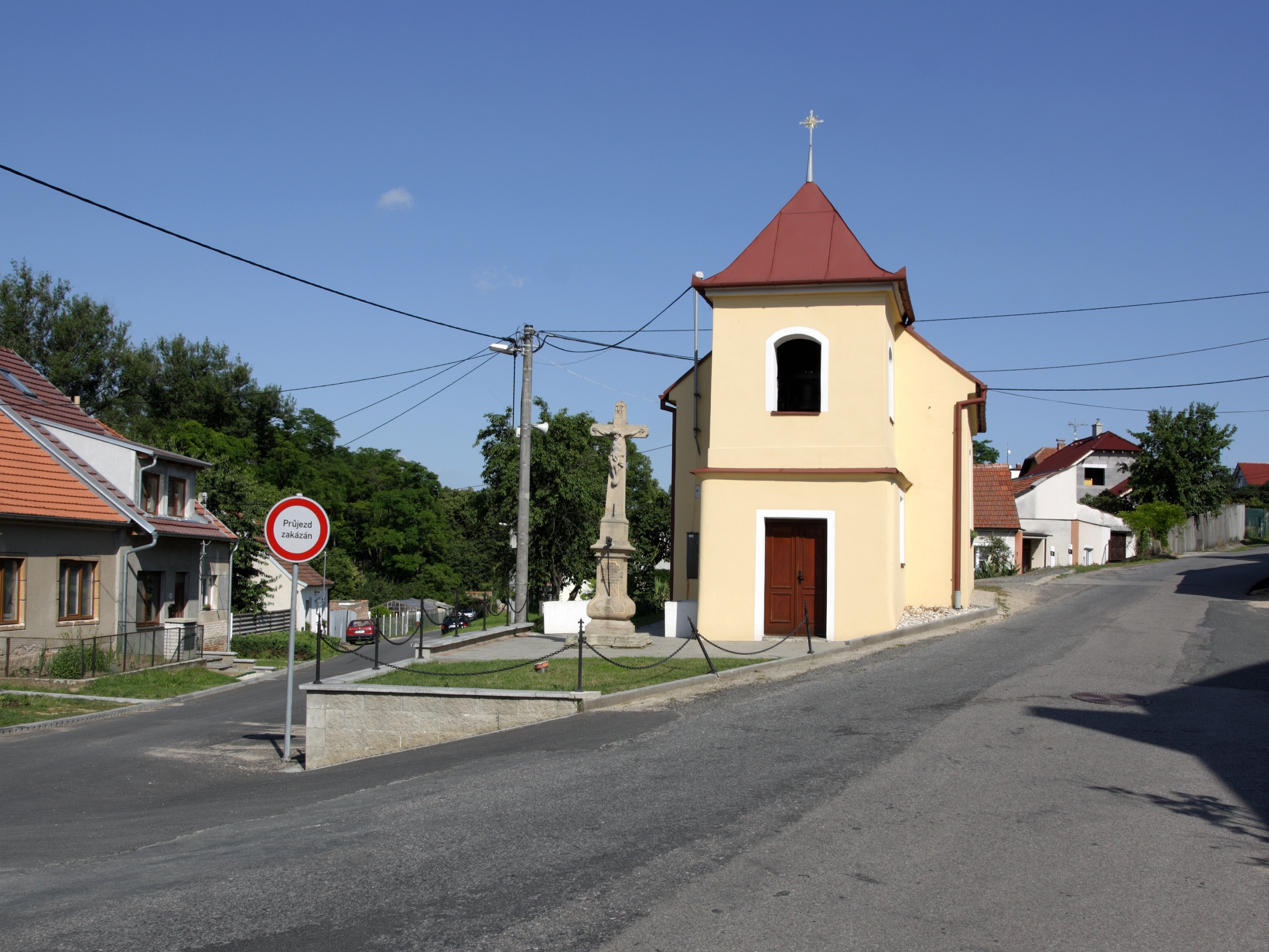
- Centre of Ledce

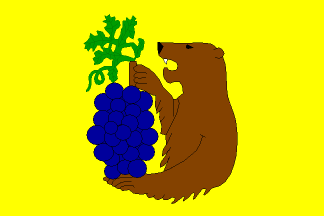
- Flag Coat of arms

- Location in the Czech Republic
- Coordinates: 49°3′6″N 16°33′25″E
- Country: Czech Republic
- Region: South Moravian
- District: Brno-Country
- First mentioned: 1351

Area
  - Total: 3.63 km^{2} (1.40 sq mi)
- Elevation: 200 m (660 ft)

Population (2026-01-01)
  - Total: 256
  - Density: 70.5/km^{2} (183/sq mi)
- Time zone: UTC+1 (CET)
  - Summer (DST): UTC+2 (CEST)
- Postal code: 664 62
- Website: www.ledceobec.cz

Ledce is a municipality and village in Brno-Country District in the South Moravian Region of the Czech Republic. It has about 300 inhabitants.

Ledce lies approximately 18 kilometres (11 mi) south of Brno and 193 km (120 mi) south-east of Prague.

== Demographics ==
Historical population
Year	Pop.	±%
1869	177	—
1880	182	+2.8%
1890	212	+16.5%
1900	252	+18.9%
1910	298	+18.3%
1921	305	+2.3%
1930	272	−10.8%
1950	283	+4.0%
1961	289	+2.1%
1970	310	+7.3%
1980	268	−13.5%
1991	205	−23.5%
2001	199	−2.9%
2011	207	+4.0%
2021	213	+2.9%
Source: Censuses
