= Richard Robinson (poet) =

English translator

- Occupation: Poet

Richard Robinson (fl. 1574) was an English poet.

== Biography ==
Robinson who describes himself as "of Alton," which has been understood as Halton in Cheshire; it is more probably Alton in Staffordshire. Thomas Corser identified him with the student at Cambridge who published "The Poor Knight his Palace of Private Pleasure," 1579. But the identification is unlikely because the only Richard Robinson known at Cambridge in 1579 was beadel of the university (Cal. State Papers, Dom. Eliz. cxxxii. 19 Oct. 1579). In "The Rewarde of Wickednesse" Robinson speaks of himself as servant in 1574 in the household of the Earl of Shrewsbury, "the simplest of a hundred in my lord's house," and as writing the poem "in such times as my turn came to serve in watch of the Scottish Queen. I then every night collected some part thereof." In "A Golden Mirrour" Robinson shows an intimate acquaintance with the nobility and gentry of Cheshire. It is presumable from the concluding lines of this latter poem that he was advanced in years at the time of its composition, and it may have been published posthumously. John Proctor the publisher purchased the manuscript of it in 1587, without knowing the author, but supposing him to have been "of the north country."

To Robinson are ascribed:

- "The ruefull Tragedie of Hemidos and Thelay," 1569 (Arber, Stationers' Register, i. 220); not known to be extant.
- "The Rewarde of Wickednesse, discoursing the sundrie monstrous Abuses of wicked and ungodlye Worldelinges in such sort set out as the same have been dyversely practised in the Persons of Popes, Harlots, Proude Princes, Tyrantes, Romish Byshoppes," &c., 1573; dedicated to Gilbert Talbot, second son of the Earl of Shrewsbury, and dated "from my chamber in Sheffield Castle," 19 Aug. 1574 (sic). It introduces Skelton, Wager, Heywood, Googe, Studley, and others, and near the end contains a furious attack on Edmund Bonner as the devil's agent on earth. Presumably he had suffered at Bonner's hands.
- "A Golden Mirrour conteininge certaine pithie and figurative Visions prognosticating Good Fortune to England and all true English Subjects … whereto be adjoyned certaine pretie Poems, written on the Names of sundrie both noble and worshipfull," London, 1589 (reprinted for the Chetham Society, with introduction by Corser, in 1851).
