= Jasper Heywood =

English Jesuit priest (1535–1598)

Jasper Heywood (1535 – 9 January 1598) was an English Jesuit priest. He is known as the English translator of three Latin plays of Seneca, the Troas (1559), the Thyestes (1560) and Hercules Furens (1561).

== Life ==
He was son of John Heywood, and became a fellow of Merton College, Oxford, but was compelled to resign in 1558. In the same year he was elected a fellow of All Souls College, but, refusing to conform to the changes in religion at the beginning of the reign of Elizabeth I, he gave up his fellowship and went to Rome, where he was received into the Society of Jesus.

For seventeen years he was professor of moral theology and controversy in the Jesuit College at Dillingen, in present-day Bavaria. In 1581 he was sent to England as superior of the Jesuit mission, but his leniency in that position led to his recall.

On his way back to the Continent, a violent storm drove him back to the English coast. He was arrested on the charge of being a priest, but, although efforts were made to induce him to abjure his opinions, he remained firm. He was condemned to perpetual exile on pain of death, and died at Naples on 9 January 1598. His nephew was the poet and preacher John Donne.

== Works ==
Heywood's verse translations of Seneca were supplemented by other plays contributed by Alexander Neville, Thomas Nuce, John Studley and Thomas Newton. Newton collected these translations in one volume, Seneca, his tenne tragedies translated into Englysh (1581). The importance of this work in the development of English drama can hardly be overestimated.

He also wrote four poems published in 1576 in the Elizabethan collection known as The Paradise of Dainty Devices.

== See also ==
- Canons of Elizabethan poetry

Catholic Church titles
New office	Vice-Prefect of the English Mission of the Society of Jesus residing in England; 1581–1583	Succeeded by William Weston
