= Thomas Peend =

16th-century English Translator

Thomas Peend or Delapeend (fl. 1556–1577) was a Tudor poet and lawyer. He is chiefly remembered as the author-translator of A Pleasant Fable of Hermaphroditus and Salmacis (1565).

== Family ==
Thomas Peend was the son of John Peend of Leeds, near Maidstone in Kent. When he wrote his will in 1570, Edward Pynde of Hollingbourne, a few miles north of Leeds, named Thomas Peend of Leeds as his cousin. Finally, when Peend dedicated A Most Notable History of John, Lord Mandozze (1565) to sir Thomas Kempe of Wye, Kent (1517–1591), he called Kempe his kinsman.

== School, university, inns of court ==
Peend was recorded as a scholar at King’s School, Canterbury, in 1556. The master was the antiquary John Tywne (d. 1581); and one of Peend’s class-mates was Twyne’s son, Lawrence Twyne, who would go on to write The Pattern of Painful Adventures (1576), a source for Shakespeare’s Pericles. Peend matriculated as a pensioner (fee-paying student) at Christ’s College, Cambridge, in 1559. He is not known to have taken a degree. He may also have attended Oxford. On 15 May 1564, he was admitted to the Middle Temple in London, one of the four law schools known as the Inns of Court. It was now that he wrote A Pleasant Fable of Hermaphroditus and Salmacis and A Most Notable History of John, Lord Mandozze. He was briefly expelled from the Middle Temple in the winter of 1566/67 for wounding a fellow-member, Andrew Hemerford (d. c. 1581). In 1577, he was one of those appointed to provide for the Reader’s Feast at the inn; and that is the last we hear of Thomas Peend.

== Works ==
=== A Pleasant Fable of Hermaphroditus and Salmacis (1565) ===
Author-translator of A Pleasant Fable of Hermaphroditus and Salmacis. The book was printed by Thomas Colwell in December 1565. Peend dedicated the work to Nicholas St Leger of Ulcombe, a few miles south of Leeds. He signs it thus : ‘From my chamber over against Serjeants’ Inn in Chancery Lane. 1564’. The book has four parts : I. ‘A Pleasant Fable of Hermaphroditus and Salmacis’ | II. ‘The Moral’ | III. ‘A Pleasant Question’ (namely : Why did the beautiful Venus sleep with the ugly Vulcan?) | IV. A glossary of names and places. All are in verse, except the glossary. Peend tells St Leger that he had started work on a translation of Ovid’s Metamormorposes, but that he gave it up when he learned that somebody else was working on the same project. He means Arthur Golding, whose translation of the first four books of the Metamorphoses appeared in 1565. Peend salvaged some of his original work by rewriting the fable of Hermaphroditus from book IV of the Metamorphoses, enlarging it with his own work very considerably. He also added a moral explanation of its meaning. Later, he added the ‘Pleasant Question’ and the glossary.

=== A Most Notable History of John, Lord Mandozze (1565) ===
Author-translator of A Most Notable History of John, Lord Mandozze. The book was printed by Thomas Colwell in 1565. Peend dedicated the work to sir Thomas Kempe of Wye, Kent, whom he claims as his kinsman. This time it is signed : ‘From the Middle Temple’. Peend also wrote a verse preface ‘To the Reader’. The single surviving copy of the book is a fragment, and about half of the story is missing. It is a greatly enlarged translation of the sixth story in Pierre Boaistuau’s Histoires tragiques (1559). Boaistuau claimed that he took the story directly from a Spanish source written by 'Valentinus Barruchius'. Boaistuau in fact translated and enlarged the tale as he found in it the Novelle of Matteo Bandello. Peend’s translation is in verse.

=== Poem for Studley's Agamemnon (1566) ===
Author of ‘To the Reader : Thomas Delapeend in the Writer’s Behalf’. This is a poem defending and commending John Studley and his translation of Seneca’s tragedy Agamemnon (1566). Peend and Studley may have met at Cambridge, for the latter matriculated at Trinity College in 1561, only two years after Peend went up to Christ’s.
