= John Studley =

English translator

John Studley (fl. 1563-1603) was an English clergyman and translator. He made English versions of four of Seneca's tragedies, as well as one of John Bale's lengthy Pageant of Popes.

== Family ==
John Studley came from Wimborne Minster, Dorset. His parents are unknown. He married Mary Baskerville, illegitimate daughter of Thomas Baskerville of Netherwood, near Stoke Lacy, Herefordshire. They had three children : Anne, Mary, and Nathaniel. Anne married Maurice Willis, and Mary’s husband was David Middleton of Westerham. Kent. Nathaniel was admitted to Gray’s Inn on 7 February 1588, having previously studied at Barnard’s Inn. This suggests that he was born around 1570, when his father was still a fellow of Trinity College, presumably married to Mary Baskerville. Nathaniel married Elizabeth Jilbert, daughter and sole heir of John Jylbert of Sevenoaks, Kent. He made his seat at Old Park in Sundridge, near Sevenoaks.

== At Cambridge (1563—1573) ==
Studley attended Westminster School, then matriculated pensioner from Trinity College, Cambridge, on 12 May 1563. This may suggest that he was born between, say, 1545 and 1549. Some of his early days at Cambridge must have been taken up with his first translations of the tragedies of Seneca. Agamemnon was printed by Thomas Colwell in 1566. The work was prefaced by several commendatory verses in English and Latin. Thomas Nuce, who translated Seneca's Octavia in 1566, wrote a piece in both languages, as did a certain W. R. English verses were supplied by H. C., T. B., and W. Parkar, as well as by Thomas Peend (here Delapeend), who was recently the author, in 1565, of Hermaphroditus and Salmacis and Lord John Mandosse. Studley dedicated the translation to sir William Cecil, to whom he at some point also addressed Latin verses in manuscript. The second play he translated was Medea, also printed by Colwell. This books comes without the armour-plating of commendations that he procured for his Agamemnon. He dedicated it to Francis Russell, earl of Bedford. When Thomas Newton published Seneca his Ten Tragedies in 1580, he reprinted Studley’s Agamemnon and Medea, and also his translations of Hippolytus and Hercules Oetaeus. When exactly Studley wrote them is unknown, but the Hippolytus may have been ready by 1566/67.

Studley took his B.A. in 1567, when he was also elected a minor fellow of Trinity, on 8 September. He took his M.A. in 1570, and was elected a major fellow on 7 April. He was still in touch with the world of literature, for he was one of those who wrote verse on the death of Nicholas Carr in 1571. Studley was ordained deacon at Farnham by Robert Horne, bishop of Winchester, on 27 October 1572. He was inclined to puritanism, and on 1 February 1573 was summoned before the heads of colleges at Cambridge on a charge of non-conformity, namely an inclination towards the heresy of Novatianism. He vacated his fellowship at Trinity the same year.

== After Cambridge (1573—1603) ==
On 28 October 1573, Studley was instituted to the rectory of Ockham, near Woking, Surrey, in the diocese of Winchester. His patrons were John Vaughan of Sutton Place, Surrey, and his wife Anne. On 25 October 1574, he was ordained priest by Horne, at Waltham Manor. His commitment to the puritan cause was confirmed in 1574, when his translation of The Pageant of the Popes, written in Latin by John Bale, was published by Thomas Marsh. Studley dedicated it to Thomas Radcliffe, earl of Sussex.

On 7 May 1580, Studley was presented by the Crown to the vicarage of Westerham, Kent, in the diocese of Rochester. He was formally instituted to the living a week later on 14 May. He kept Ockham, though, at a distance of 17 miles it was technically too far away for him to serve properly. But Thomas Bromley, lord chancellor, appears to have granted him some sort of permission to keep both livings. He was clearly living at Ockham in the 1590s, for he employed curates at Westerham between 1591 and 1603.

At some point in his time at Ockham, he gave a sermon at nearby Bisley, for he complained in a letter to Sir William More of nearby Loseley, that he had been slandered by a certain John Rumsey, who said he had made a lewd comparison between the Roman Catholic pax and the female genitals. He wrote to More on another occasion to tell him that he had successfully pursued and had arrested a man called Middleton, whom he accused of having long ago done mischief to a maidservant of a local family.

John Studley was still the incumbent in both parishes in 1603. He had been replaced at Ockham by 1606, and at Westerham by 1607. Studley had evidently died in the interval.

== The Poet ==
Studley made free and easy of Seneca in his translations. To the Agamemnon he added a scene at the close, in which he renarrated the death of Cassandra, the imprisonment of Electra, and the flight of Orestes. To the Medea he prefixed an original prologue and amplified the choruses. He generally expanded on the Latin of the original. He has not been widely admired. Spearing's judgement in 1912 has not been seriously challenged in the hundred years that have followed : 'He is certainly no great poet, but he occasionally has some fine lines'. Ker and Winston offer a detailed and broadly sympathetic view of Studley's style in their 2013 edition (inter alia) of the Agamemnon. Shakespeare's debt to the Medea has been well documented.
