= Oedipus (Seneca) =

Tragedy by Seneca

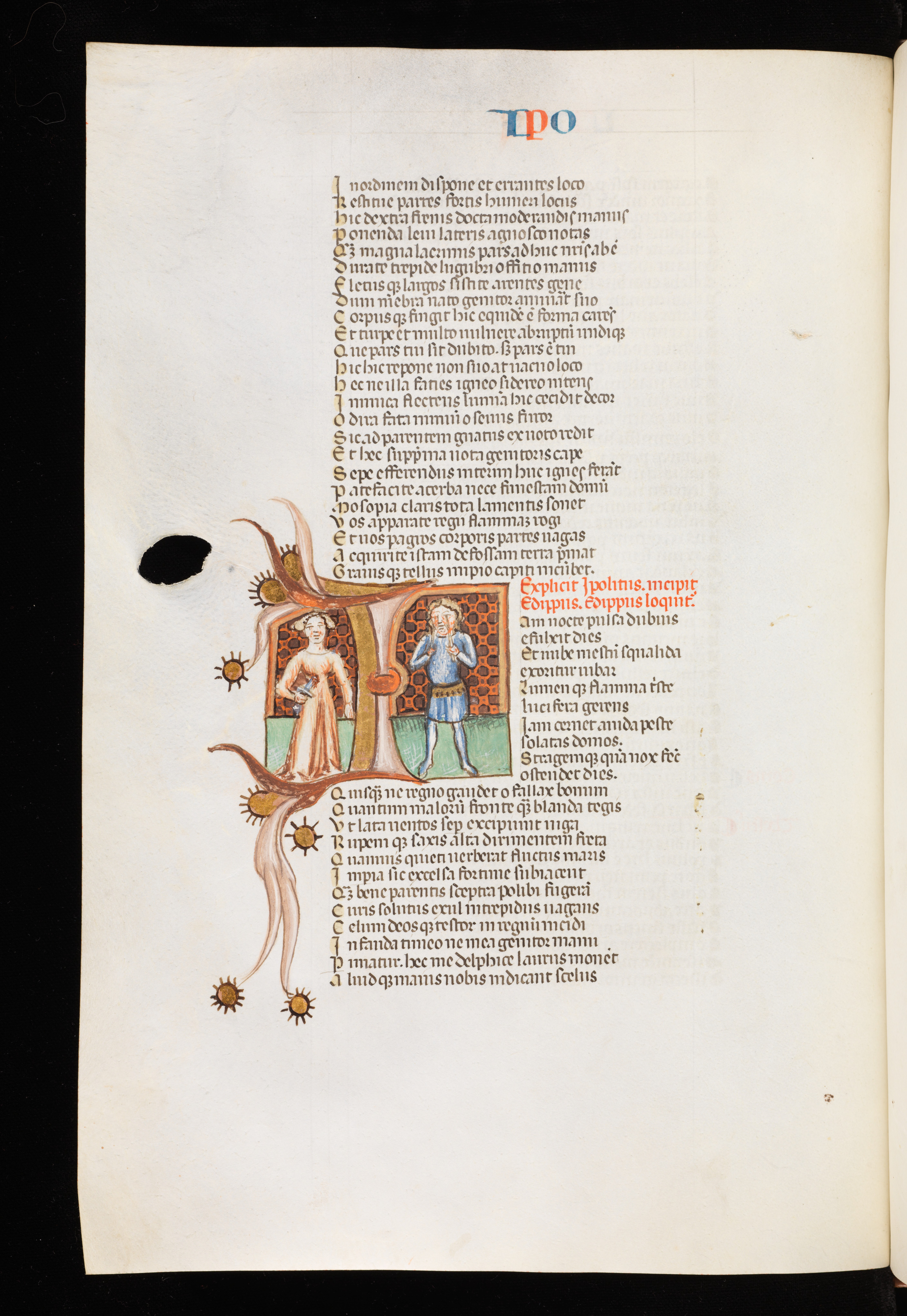
- First page of Oedipus from a 15th-century Italian manuscript
- Author: Lucius Annaeus Seneca
- Language: Latin
- Genre: Tragedy
- Set in: Thebes
- Publication date: 1st century
- Publication place: Rome
- Text: Oedipus at Wikisource

Oedipus is a fabula crepidata (Roman tragic play with Greek subject) of c. 1061 lines of verse that was written by Lucius Annaeus Seneca at some time during the 1st century AD. It is a retelling of the story of Oedipus, which is better known through the play Oedipus Rex by the Athenian playwright, Sophocles. It is written in Latin.

== Characters ==
- Oedipus is the king of Thebes, husband of Jocasta, and he is the supposed son of king Polybus of Corinth. He is the main protagonist of the play.
- Jocasta is the widow of the former king Laius, wife of Oedipus and sister of Creon.
- Creon is Jocasta's brother, and the chief aid to Oedipus in Thebes.
- Tiresias is a blind prophet who is charged by Oedipus to find the killer of King Laius.
- Manto is the daughter of Tiresias. She is used in the play to describe Tiresias' sacrifice to him, and therefore also to the audience.
- An Old Man (senex) is a messenger from Corinth who comes to tell Oedipus that Polybus is dead, and reveals part of Oedipus' history to him.
- Phorbas is an old shepherd who had given Oedipus to the Old Man when Oedipus was a child and who reveals Oedipus' real parentage to him.
- Messenger (nuntius) is the man who, in Act 5, relates what has become of Oedipus.
- The chorus are singers that aid the audience in understanding what emotion they should feel after a scene.

== Plot ==
=== Act One ===
The play opens with a fearful Oedipus lamenting a vicious plague which is affecting Thebes, the city over which he rules. People are dying in such huge numbers that there are not enough of the living to ensure that each of the victims is cremated. He also mentions a prophecy that he had received from Apollo before he came to Thebes that he would kill his father and marry his mother. He had thus fled the kingdom of his father Polybus. However, Oedipus is so disturbed by what is occurring in Thebes that he even considers returning to his home city. But Jocasta strengthens his resolution, and he stays.

=== Act Two ===
Creon returns from the Oracle at Delphi with the instruction that Thebes is required to avenge the death of the former King Laius if the citywide plague is to end. Oedipus utters an ironic curse on the yet unrevealed killer, wishing for him "the crimes that I have fled from". The prophet Tiresias appears and is asked by Oedipus to make clear the meaning of the oracle. Tiresias then proceeds to carry out a sacrifice, which contains a number of horrific signs. As Tiresias does not have the name of King Laius' killer, he proposes to summon Laius' spirit back from Erebus to learn the identity of the guilty one.

=== Act Three ===
Creon returns from seeing Tiresias after he has spoken to Laius' ghost, but is unwilling to reveal to Oedipus the killer's name. Oedipus threatens him, and then Creon relents. He says Laius accuses the king of having blood on his hands, and who "has defiled his father's marriage-bed". He goes on to say that Laius promises the plague will cease if the king is expelled from Thebes. Creon advises Oedipus to abdicate, but Oedipus believes that he has invented this story, along with Tiresias, in order to seize his throne. Despite Creon's protestations of innocence, Oedipus has him arrested.

=== Act Four ===
Oedipus is troubled by the faint memory of a man whom he had killed on the road for behaving arrogantly before him while Oedipus was travelling to Thebes. An elderly messenger comes from Corinth to tell Oedipus that his father King Polybus has died and for him to come and take his throne. Oedipus does not want to return as he still fears the prophecy that he will marry his mother. The messenger then tells him that Corinth's queen is not his mother, and that he was given Oedipus as a baby on mount Cithaeron. Oedipus then learns, after threatening the shepherd that gave him away, that he is, in fact, Jocasta's son.

=== Act Five ===
A messenger relays the news that Oedipus contemplated suicide and wanted his body flung to wild beasts; but then Oedipus decided that his crime deserved something even more horrible, on account of the suffering Thebes has endured. He resolved to find a slow death for himself. He craved a punishment in which he would neither "join the number of the dead nor dwell among the living". The messenger goes on to explain how Oedipus tore out his eyes with his hands. The chorus question fate, each person's "commanding thread of life", and then hear Oedipus entering. He appears with both eyes removed and is confronted by Jocasta. She realises from his action that she, too, must punish herself for her crimes. While on stage, she takes his sword and kills herself with it.

== The role of the chorus ==
The chorus at the end of Act 1 give an account of the plague, and its development. At the end of Act 2 they give an account of Bacchus, who was the patron god of Thebes. At the end of Act 3 they recount earlier horrific occurrences connected with Thebes. At the end of Act 4, however, they turn more reflective and praise living a life along "a safe middle course" rather than pursuing ambition. They therefore relate the story of Icarus as a parable of a person who flew too high. They do, however, specify that no one is able to alter their fate. This second point is made much more forcefully in their speech in Act 5, where they stress that neither God nor prayer can alter the life that is predestined for the individual. (This view of fate is contrary to the teachings of Stoicism, which hold that fate and divinity are the same. Also, the view of fate as arbitrary, rather than rational and benign, is not part of the Stoic cosmological view.)

== Comparison with Sophocles' Oedipus Rex ==
- The character of Oedipus in Seneca's play is fearful, "guilt-ridden and open from the beginning to the notion that he may be implicated in the great Theban plague; whereas Sophocles' Oedipus is proud and imperious."
- Seneca's play has a considerably more violent tone. For example, the sacrifice carried out by Tiresias is described in graphic and gory detail.
- Sophocles’ play does not contain the character of Manto.
- In Seneca's play, Oedipus blinds himself before the death of Jocasta by pulling out his eyeballs. In Sophocles’ play, Oedipus blinds himself after seeing the corpse of Jocasta, using golden brooches from her dress to stab out his eyes.
- In Seneca's play Oedipus is, at best, an aid to the death of Jocasta, and from the ambiguous lines may even have taken her life. In Sophocles’ play, Jocasta hangs herself, and Oedipus subsequently discovers her lifeless body.
- In Seneca, Laius names his killer. In Sophocles, Oedipus’ guilt emerges gradually throughout the developing play.
- In Seneca's play there is no mention of Oedipus’ feelings towards his children, whereas in Sophocles’ play Oedipus leaves them to Creon's guardianship and wants to hold them again.
- Seneca's play ends with Oedipus leaving Thebes, whereas in Sophocles’ Oedipus is told by Creon that his rule is ended.
- Seneca names the Theban shepherd as Phorbas, whereas Sophocles leaves him nameless.

== Translations into English ==
- The first translation into English of Oedipus was by Alexander Neville and it appeared in 1563, as well as in Thomas Newton's collection of Seneca's plays, His Tenne Tragedies, in 1581.
- An English translation from Frank Justus Miller's 1938 edition of this work is available online at theoi.com and archive.org.
- Oedipus is one of the five plays of Seneca chosen and translated by E. F. Watling and published by Penguin Classics in 1966. ISBN 0-14-044174-3
- The English poet laureate Ted Hughes published a translation of the play in 1969. ISBN 0-571-09223-3
- In 1999 Professor Michael Rutenberg published his free translation of the play, into which he has placed excerpts from Seneca's moral philosophy. ISBN 0-86516-459-2
- Fitch, John G., ed. and trans. 2004. Seneca, Tragedies. Vol. 2. Cambridge, MA: Harvard Univ. Press.
- Wilson, Emily. 2010. Oxford University Press Inc. New York. First published as Oxford World Classics paperback 2010.
- Boyle, Anthony J. 2011. Oedipus, Seneca. Oxford: Oxford Univ. Press.

== Reputation ==
During the English Renaissance in Elizabethan England, Oedipus, along with Seneca's other plays, was regarded as a model of classical drama. The translator Alexander Neville regarded the play as a work of moral instruction. He said of the play: "mark thou ... what is meant by the whole course of the History: and frame thy lyfe free from such mischiefes". The influential early 20th Century French Theatre critic Antonin Artaud considered Seneca's Oedipus and Thyestes models for his Theatre of Cruelty, originally speaking and writing about Seneca's use of 'the plague' in Oedipus in a famous lecture on 'Theatre and the Plague' given at the Sorbonne (April 6, 1933) and later revised and printed in Nouvelle Revue Française (no. 253, 1 Oct. 1934).

In recent times, A. J. Boyle in his book Tragic Seneca: An Essay in the Theatrical Tradition (1997) rejects the criticism of T. S. Eliot that Oedipus, like the other plays of Seneca, is simplistically peopled by stock characters. He says that "In the Oedipus, for example, it is hard to name any stock character except the messenger." The play, particularly with its theme of one's powerlessness against stronger forces, has been described as being as "relevant today in a world filled with repeated horrors against those who are innocent, as it was in ancient times". In 2008, translator Frederick Ahl wrote that in comparison with Sophocles's Oedipus the King, Seneca's version of the myth "is today among the least commonly read of ancient tragedies, largely because the scholarly world regards it as a dull and vastly inferior work".

== Performances ==
Although it is debated whether the play was written for performance in Antiquity, it has been successfully staged since the Renaissance and music for the choruses by Andrea Gabrieli survives from a 1585 production.

=== On stage ===
- In the mid-1550s there was a performance of the play in the English city of Cambridge.
- In 1968, Ted Hughes' adaptation was staged at the National Theatre in London, directed by Peter Brook.
- In May 2005, Michael Rutenberg was invited to stage the play by the Department of Theatre at the University of Haifa in Israel. He chose to set it in a post-nuclear holocaust future.
- Also in 2005, a version based on Hughes' translation, and which closed with Johnny Nash's "I Can See Clearly Now", was performed on Broadway by the Theatre By The Blind, and directed by Ike Schambelan.
- In 2011, Ted Hughes' adaptation was staged at BAC (Battersea Arts Centre) in London, directed by Linda Manfredini.
- (MCTC)
- In 2015, Theatre Nisha staged performances in various Indian cities.

=== In the cinema ===
The director Ovliakuli Khodzhakuli made his cinematic debut in 2004 with the Kirghiz language film, Edip, which is based on Seneca's play. Khodzhakuli makes a cameo appearance in the film as King Laius. The principal actors are Anna Mele as Oedipus, and Dzhamilia Sydykbaeva as Jocasta. For a review of the film, see "Ovliakuli Khodzhakuli: Oedipus (Edip), 2004". Kinokultura.com.
