= William Wager =

William Wager (fl. 1566), writer of interludes, is known only by his works.

== Works ==
=== The Longer Thou Livest ===
'A very mery and pythie Commedie, called, The longer thou livest, the more foole thou art. A myrrour very necessary for youth, and specially for such as are like to come to dignities and promotion: as it may well appear in the matter folowynge. Newly compiled by W. Wager. Imprinted at London, by William How for Richard Johnes: and are to be solde at his shop under the Lottery House,' b.l. n.d. [c. 1568] 4to. An account of this interesting interlude is given by Collier in his History of Dramatic Poetry (ii. 248-253). The play is remarkable for the list of old songs quoted by the character Moros in the opening scene.

=== Enough Is As Good As a Feast ===
Around 1570 John Allde printed 'A comedy or interlude intituled, Inough is as good as a feast very fruitful, godly and ful of pleasant mirth. Compiled by W. Wager. Seuen may easily play this enterlude.'

=== The Cruell Debtter ===
'The Cruell Debtter'; Thomas Colwell's license to print this interlude is entered in 1566 in the 'Stationers' Register' (Arber, i. 307). One leaf survives in Bagford's collection of title-pages and scraps now in the British Museum (Harl. MS. 5919, leaf 18, back). Two more leaves are in W. B. Scott's black-letter fragments, separately bound, also in the British Museum (C. 40, e. 48). The fragments make it unlikely that the Shylock story was used in the play.

=== Tis Good Sleeping In a Whole Skin ===
'Tis good sleeping in a whole skin,' a manuscript, is said to have been destroyed by Warburton's servant. It may have been the second title of The Cruell Debtter.

=== The History of the Tryall of Chevalry ===
'The History of the Tryall of Chevalry' (1605), reprinted in Mr. A. H. Bullen's 'Old English Plays' (iii. 263), has been doubtfully attributed to Wager. More probable is the attribution to him of 'Tom Tyler and his Wife. An excellent old Play, as it was printed and acted about a hundred Years ago. Together with an exact Catalogue of all the playes that were ever yet printed. The Second impression. London, 1661,' 4to. This play is full of snatches of songs, like The longer thou livest. It is given to Wager in the 'British Museum Catalogue' on the authority of the appended 'exact catalogue,' which gives him the 'Trial of Chivalry' also.

== Attribution confusion ==
William Wager has sometimes been erroneously identified with William Gager, a writer of Latin tragedies, who was a graduate of Christ Church, Oxford, late in the sixteenth century. William Wager has also been confused with Lewis Wager (fl. 1566), who became rector of St. James's, Garlickhithe, on 28 March 1560 (Newcourt).
