= Thomas Newton (poet) =

English clergyman, poet, author and translator

Thomas Newton (c. 1542–1607) was an English clergyman, poet, author and translator.

== Life ==
The eldest son of Edward Newton of Park House, in Butley, a part of the parish of Prestbury, Cheshire, he was educated first at the Macclesfield grammar school by John Brownsword, a much-praised schoolmaster. Newton went on to Trinity College, Oxford, which he left in 1562 to study at Queens' College, Cambridge, but then returned to his original college.

In 1569 or 1570, he published The Worthye Booke of Old Age. The book's preface was dated "frome Butleye the seuenth of March 1569", and many of his other books before 1583 were dated from the same place. He wrote books on historical, medical and theological subjects, and contributed many commendatory verses in English and Latin to various works, a common practice of the time. For many of his verses and books he styles himself "Thomas Newtonus Cestreshyrius", showing an evident affection for his county of birth.

He may have practiced as a physician in Butley and taught at Macclesfield school. In 1583 he was appointed rector of Little Ilford, Essex, from where most of his later works are dated. His most significant publications were a series of translations of Cicero and of Seneca's tragedies. Atropoion Delion; or, The Death of Delia, a pastoral elegy on the death of Queen Elizabeth in 1603 may have been by this Thomas Newton.

According to The Dictionary of National Biography:

"Newton was a skilled writer of Latin verse, in which, Ritson states, he excited the admiration of his contemporaries; while Warton describes him as the elegant Latin encomiast and the first Englishman who wrote Latin elegiacs with classical clearness and terseness. He also wrote English verses with ease and fluency, and translated several works from the Latin. All his books are now very scarce; most of them have very long titles."

Newton was married and the father of two sons, Emanuel (who seems to have died before his father) and Abel. After his death in 1607 (sometime between 27 April, when his will was dated, and 13 June, when it was proved at Canterbury), he was probably buried at Little Ilford.

== Bibliography ==
Each year links to its corresponding "[year] in literature" or "[year] in poetry" article (spelling and capitalisation as in the source material):

- 1568: An epitaphe vpon the [...] Lady Knowles (attributed to Newton, but "doubtful if by him", according to the Dictionary of National Biography)
- 1569 (attribution less certain): The Booke of Marcus Tullius Cicero, entituled Paradoxia Stoicorum [...]; the dedication, signed "Thomas Newton" is dated "from Greenwich the kalendes of June 1569"
- 1569: The Worthye Booke of Old Age, translated from Cicero
- 1574: A Direction for the Health of Magistrates and Studentes, translated from Latin, dedicated to Sir Francis Walsingham
- 1575: A Notable Historie of the Saracens, translation from the Italian of Agostino Curione.
- 1576: The Touchstone of Complexions, translated from Latin; second edition 1581; third edition 1633
- 1577: Foure Seuerall Treatises of M. Tullius Cicero
- 1577: Vocabula Magistri Stanbrigii; second edition 1596, third edition 1615, fourth edition 1636, fifth edition 1649
- 1580: Approved Medicines and Cordiall Receiptes ("Receiptes": Recipes)
- 1580 (attribution less certain): A Pleasaunt Dialogue concerning Phisicke and Phisitions [...] translated out of the Castlin tongue by T. N.
- Year uncertain, but possibly 1580: A View of Valyaunce
- 1581: (Editor, and translator of one of the works, the Thebais) Seneca his tenne Tragedies translated into Englysh, a compilation of translations previously published separately by Studley, Nevile, Nuce and Jasper Heywood, here collected for the first time in one volume; dedicated to Sir Thomas Heneage, treasurer of the Queen's Chamber
- 1581: A Commentarie or Exposition vpon the twoo Epistles Generall of Sainct Peter and that of Sainct Jude, translated from the Latin of Martin Luther
- 1586: True and Christian Friendshippe, translated from Latin
- 1586: The Olde Mans Dietarie
- 1587: The True Tryall and Examination of a Mans own Selfe, translated
- 1587: An Herbal for the Bible
- 1589: Principum ac illustrium aliquot et eruditorum in Anglia virorum Ecomia and Illustrium aliquot Anglorum Encomia, contributions to Leland's De Rebus Britannicus Collectanea
- 1590: Ioannis Brunseurdi Maclesfeldensis Gymnasiarchae Progymnasmata quaedam Poetica
- 1590: Thomas Newton's Staff to lean on

=== Verses published in other works ===
Newton's poetry in English and Latin appear in more than 20 works from 1578 to 1597, including these:

- 1576: Blandie's translation of Osorius's Discourse of Ciuill and Christian Nobilitie
- 1577: Batman's Golden Booke of the Leaden Goddes
- 1578: Hunnis's Hive of Hunnye
- 1578: Lyte's translation of Dodoens' A nievve herball, or, Historie of plantes
- 1579: Munday's Mirror of Mutabilitie
- 1579: Bullein's Bulwarke of Defence
- 1587: Mirror for Magistrates
- 1587: a metrical epilogue to Heywood's Workes
- 1589: Ives's Instructions for the Warres
- 1591: Ripley's Compound of Alchymy
- 1595: Tymme's Briefe Description of Hierus lem

== Notes ==
Attribution

This article incorporates text from a publication now in the public domain: Lee, Sidney, ed. (1894). "Newton, Thomas (1542?-1607)". Dictionary of National Biography. Vol. 40. London: Smith, Elder & Co.
