= Thomas Nuce =

English translator

Thomas Nuce or Newce (died 1617) was an English translator from Latin.

== Life ==
He matriculated at Peterhouse, Cambridge in 1559. He then graduated B.A. from Pembroke Hall in 1562, M.A. 1565, and B.D. in 1572. He was in 1562 a fellow of Pembroke.

Some time after 1563 he became rector of Cley, Norfolk; from 1575 to 1583 he was rector of Beccles, Suffolk; from 1578 until his death, in 1617, he was rector of Gazeley, Suffolk. From 1581 until 1583 he was rector of Oxburgh, Norfolk. In 1599 he was appointed rector of Weston-Market, Suffolk. Besides these preferments he held, from 1585 until his death, a prebend in Ely Cathedral. He died 8 November 1617, and was buried in Gazeley Church. According to a rhyming epitaph on his tomb, his wife's name was Ann, and he was father of five sons and seven daughters.

== Works ==
While at Cambridge Nuce published 'The Ninth Tragedie of Lucius Anneus Seneca, called Octavia, translated out of Latine into English by T. N., Student in Cambridge. Imprinted at London by Henry Denham,' n. d. [1561]. This was described in the dedication to the Robert Dudley, 1st Earl of Leicester as 'the firstfruits of my yong study.' It was reprinted as the ninth play in 'Seneca his tenne Tragedies, translated into English,' 1581. Nuce was also author of fourteen Latin hexameters, and 172 lines of English verse prefixed to John Studley's translation of Seneca's 'Agamemnon,' 1561.
