= Double Herm of Socrates and Seneca =

Ancient Roman statue from the 3rd century AD

Coordinates: 52.5208°N 13.3964°E

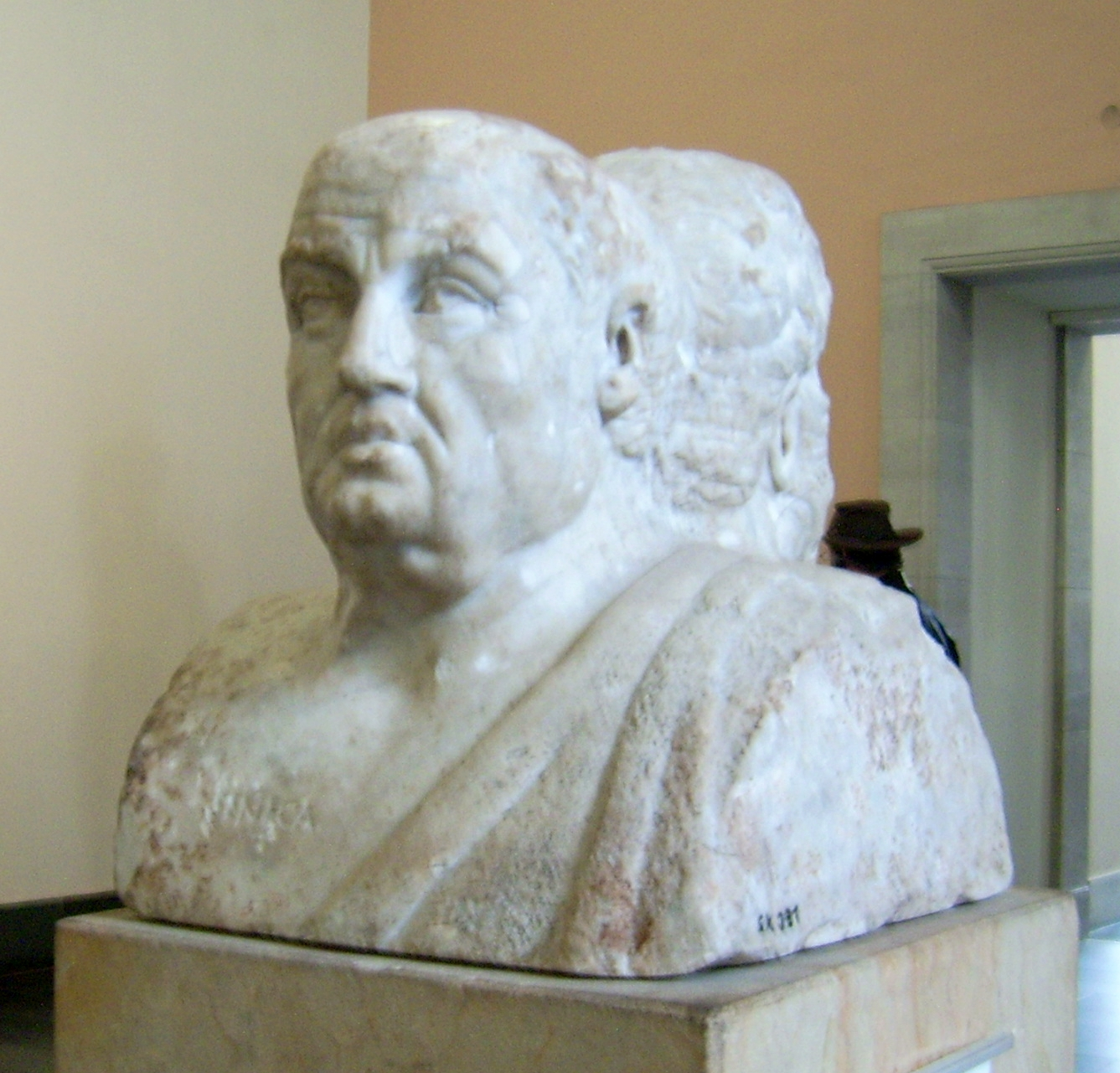
- Year: AD 200–250
- Type: sculpture
- Medium: Marble
- Dimensions: 27 cm (11 in)
- Location: Altes Museum, Berlin

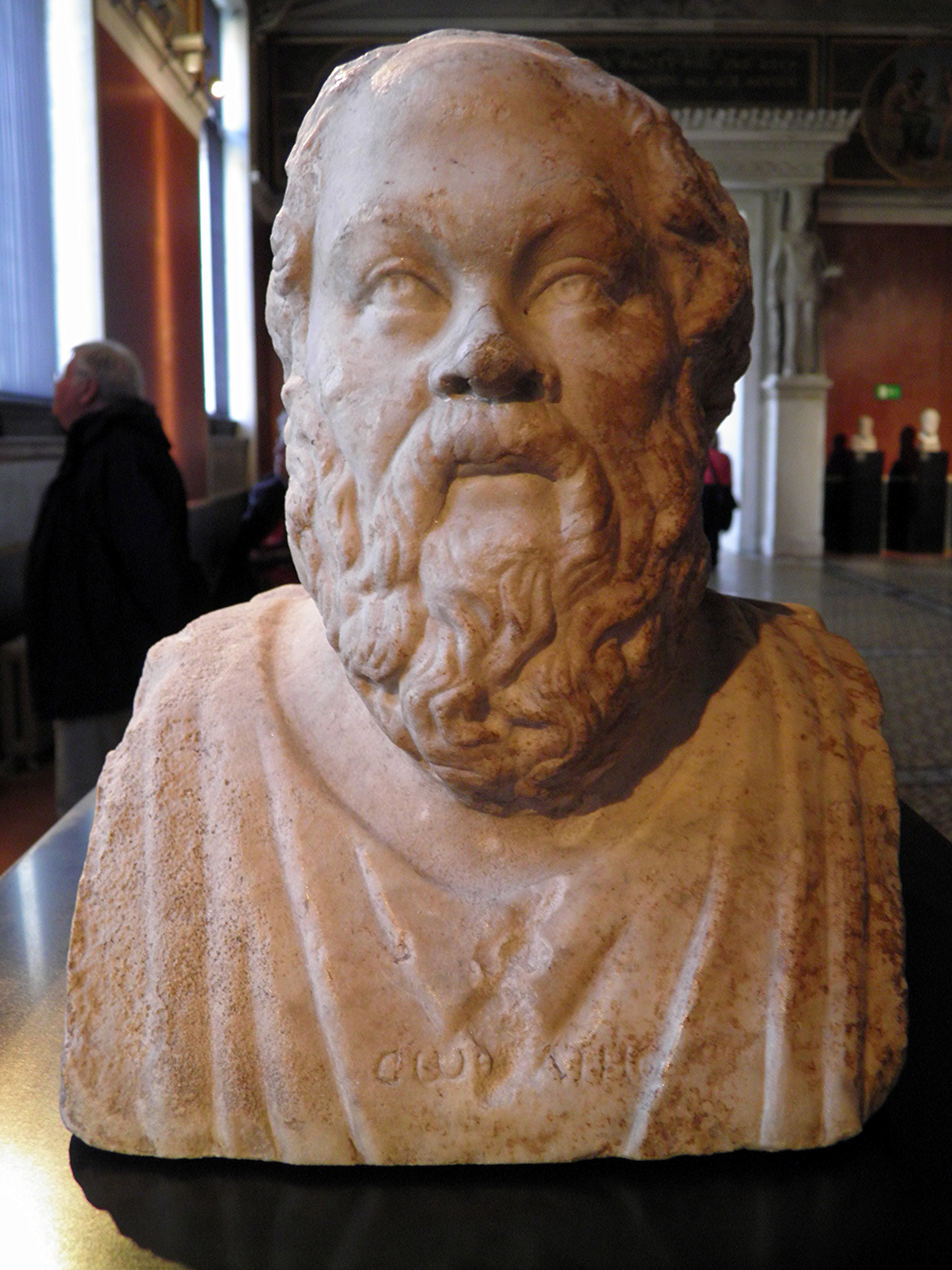
Side with Socrates

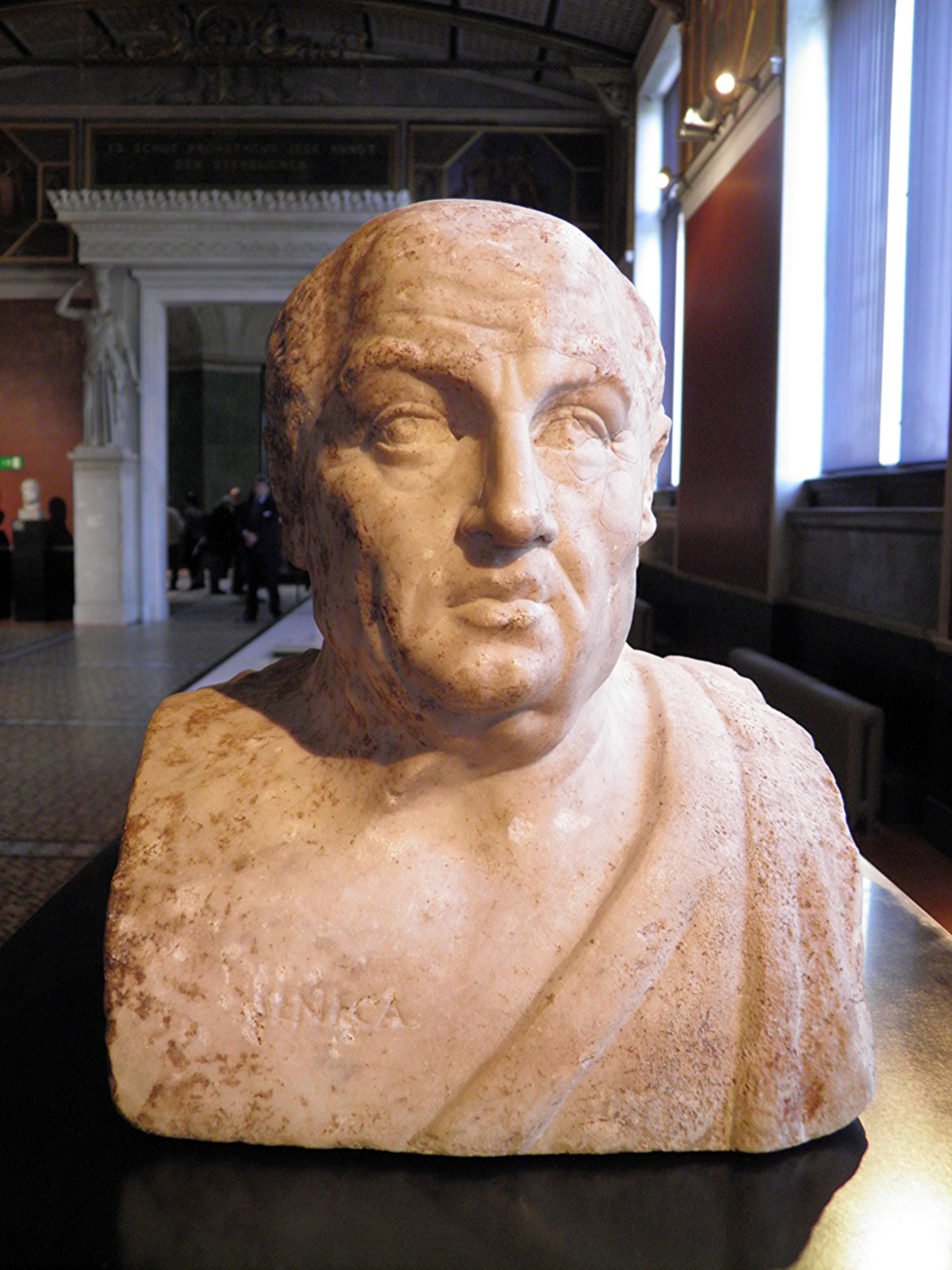
Side with Seneca

The Double Herm of Socrates and Seneca is an ancient Roman statue from the first half of the third century AD. The herm depicts the Greek philosopher Socrates on one side, and the Roman Stoic Seneca the Younger on the other. It currently belongs to the Antikensammlung Berlin, found in the Pergamon Museum.

== Description ==
The two philosophers are joined together at the back of the head; their chests are in the shape of a herm. Both men have the usual cloak of a philosopher or orator above their left shoulder, although Socrates also wears an undershirt. The bearded Socrates is given a satyr-like form, as in literary descriptions and other portraits. Seneca, on the other hand, is depicted as clean-shaven with a receding hairline. His small, full-lipped mouth is pursed. It is speculated that the depiction of Seneca derives from a work created between AD 50 and 60—within the lifetime of the philosopher.

In ancient art, double herms were a common statue type. While in Greece they were displayed in public rooms, in the Roman Empire they were shown in private spaces. Thus, the combination of the two philosophers here owed something to the personal inclinations of the person who commissioned it, even if it is not clear why these two philosophers were linked in particular, although it could have been to do with the fact that they were both forced to commit suicide. The presentation of philosophers (and poets) as double herms was the most common use of this genre. This parallel presentation is also seen in literature, for example in the Parallel Lives of Plutarch.

== Identification ==
This double herm is important to scholarship since it is the only image that can certainly be said to depict Seneca. The attribution is proven by a Latin inscription on the left side of the bust (from the point of view of someone looking at Seneca), while Socrates is identified by a Greek inscription on the right hand side. The identification of Socrates can be considered certain based on comparison with many other depictions of Socrates, many of which are of much better quality. The portrait of Seneca on the other hand is used today to identify other portraits and statues of Seneca.

== Bibliography ==
- Max Kunze. "Doppelherme des Sokrates und Seneca," in Staatliche Museen zu Berlin. Preußischer Kulturbesitz. Antikensammlung (ed.), Die Antikensammlung im Pergamonmuseum und in Charlottenburg. von Zabern, Mainz 1992, ISBN 3-8053-1187-7, pp. 215f.
- Socrates and Seneca. in Königliche Museen zu Berlin (ed.), Alexander Conze (foreword): Beschreibung der antiken Skulpturen mit Ausschluss der pergamenischen Fundstücke. Spemann, Berlin 1891, urn:nbn:de:bsz:16-diglit-34567, pp. 158–159. (Directory-No. 391)
