= Ibn Báya Ensemble =

Spanish-Moroccan early music ensemble

The Ibn Báya Ensemble (Arabic: مجموعة ابن باجة) is a Spanish-Moroccan early music ensemble formed in 1994.

The ensemble takes its name from Avempace - Abū-Bakr Muhammad ibn Yahya ibn al-Sāyigh (Arabic أبو بكر محمد بن يحيى بن الصائغ), also known as Ibn Baya (Arabic: ابن باجة), the Arab Andalusian polymath who was also a musician, and is dedicated to the music of medieval Arab Spain. The founding members were Eduardo Paniagua and Omar Metioui.

== Selected discography ==
- Ibn 'Arabi: El intérprete de los deseos . Ensemble Ibn Bàya PN 360
- Jardín de Al-Andalus
- Walladah (Córdoba 994-1077) and Ibn Zaygun (Córdoba 1003-1071)
- La Llamada de Al-Andalus
- Núba Al-Maya
- El Agua de la Alhambra
- La Felicidad Cumplida
- Nuba Al-Istihlal'
- Poemas de la Alhambra
- Alarifes Mudéjares

== See also ==
- Mohammed El-Arabi Serghini, Moroccan classical musician
- Salim Fergani, Algerian oud player and classical singer
