= Juan del Encina =

Spanish composer, poet, and playwright (born 1468)

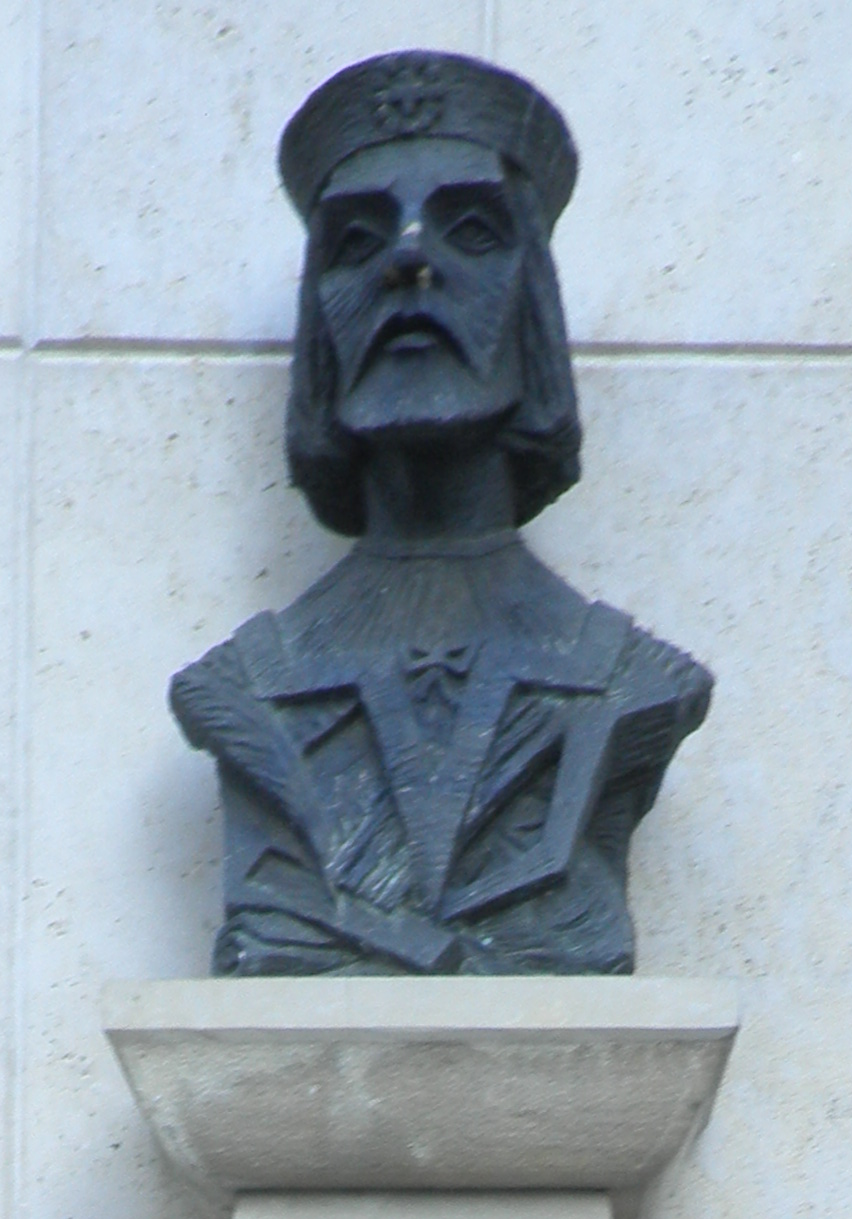
- Bust of Juan del Encina in León
- Born: 12 July 1468 possibly Fermoselle, Encina de San Silvestre or La Encina, Castile
- Died: 1529 (aged 60–61); Toledo, Spain
- Education: University of Salamanca
- Occupations: Playwright, poet, musician
- Writing career
- Subject: Religion
- Notable works: Cancionero, Égloga de Plácida y Vitoriano
- Movements: Renaissance humanism Spanish Renaissance

Juan del Encina (12 July 1468 – 1529/1530) was a Spanish composer, poet, priest, and playwright, often credited as the joint-father (even "founder" or "patriarch") of Spanish drama, alongside Gil Vicente. His birth name was Juan de Fermoselle. He spelled his name Enzina, but this is not a significant difference; it is two spellings of the same sound, in a time when "correct spelling" as we know it barely existed.

== Life ==
He was born in 1468 near Salamanca, probably at Encina de San Silvestre, one of at least 7 known children of Juan de Fermoselle, a shoemaker, and his wife. He was of Jewish converso descent. After leaving Salamanca University sometime in 1492 he became a member of the household of Don Fadrique de Toledo, the second Duke of Alba, although some sources believe that he did not work for the Duke until 1495. A plausible argument is that his first post was as a corregidor in northern Spain.

Fermoselle was a chaplain at Salamanca Cathedral in the early 1490s. It was here that he changed his name from Juan de Fermoselle to Juan del Enzina, or Encina (meaning holm oak). He was later forced to resign as chaplain because he was not ordained.

== Works ==
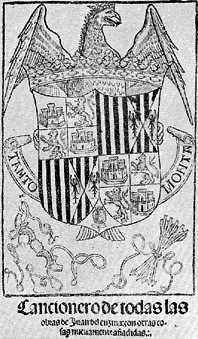
Book cover of his chansonnier's first edition (1496): Cancionero de todas las obras de Juan del Enzina con otras cosas nueuamente añadidas

In 1492 Encina entertained his patron with a dramatic piece, the Triunfo de la fama, written to commemorate the fall of Granada. In 1496 he published his Cancionero, a collection of dramatic and lyrical poems. He then applied for the cantor post at Salamanca Cathedral, but the position was divided among three singers, including his rival Lucas Fernández.

While working for the Duke of Alba, Encina was the program director, along with Fernández. Here Encina wrote pastoral eclogues, the foundation of Spanish secular drama. Encina's plays are predominantly based on shepherds and unrequited love.

Encina was ambitious, looking to be promoted based on preferment, so around 1500 he relocated to Rome, where he apparently served in the musical establishments of several cardinals or noblemen. Encina was appointed to the Archdiaconate of Málaga Cathedral by Pope Julius II in 1508.

In 1518 he resigned from position at Málaga for a simple benefice at Morón, and the following year he went to Jerusalem, where he sang his first mass. He wrote about the events during his pilgrimage to Jerusalem in Tribagia o Via Sacra de Hierusalem. In 1509 he had held a lay canonry at Málaga; in 1519 he was appointed to the priorship of León Cathedral. His last job was recorded as being in León, where he is thought to have died towards the end of 1529.

His Cancionero is preceded by a prose treatise (Arte de trobar) on the condition of the poetic art in Spain. His fourteen dramatic pieces mark the transition from the purely ecclesiastical to the secular stage. The Aucto del Repelón and the Égloga de Fileno dramatize the adventures of shepherds; the latter, like Plácida y Vitoriano, is strongly influenced by the Celestina. Several of his writings had pastoral themes as those first two, romanticizing rural life. The intrinsic interest of Encina's plays is slight, but they are important from the historical point of view, for the lay pieces form a new departure, and the devout eclogues prepare the way for the autos of the 17th century. Moreover, his lyrical poems are remarkable for their intense sincerity and devout grace.

Even though Encina's works were dedicated to royal families, he never served as a member of a royal chapel. Further, although he worked in many cathedrals and was ordained as a priest, no religious musical works of his are known to still exist. Most of his works were done by his mid-30s: these include some 60 or more songs attributed to Encina, and another 9 settings of texts to which the music could also be added, but this is not for certain. Many of the surviving pieces are villancicos (the Spanish equivalent of the Italian frottola), of which he was a leading composer. There are three and four voice settings that offer a variety of styles depending on the kind of text, with very limited movements in the voices in preparation for the cadence points. To make the text heard clearly, Encina used varied and flexible rhythms that are patterned on the accents of the verse, and used simple yet strong harmonic progressions.

== Leonese times ==
Encina held the priorship of León Cathedral from November 1523 until his final illness in December 1529. His will was presented on 14 January 1530, so the exact date of his death is not known, but it is thought to be in late 1529 or early 1530. In his will he noted that he wanted to be buried beneath the choir of Salamanca Cathedral, and in 1534 his remains were taken to the cathedral.

=== Leonese language influence ===
Juan del Encina wrote in Castilian with Leonese language influences in his pastoral eclogues. He was from Salamanca, a Leonese-speaking region, and eventually arrived at the capital of the long-vanished Kingdom of León, where he died.

He was also a songwriter for the church.

== Selected works ==
- Una sañosa porfía (1486)
- Triunfo de la fama (1492)
- Cancionero (1496)
- Tan buen ganadico (1496)
- Más vale trocar (1496)
- Triste España sin ventura (1504)
- Plácida y Victoriano (1513)
- Églogas
- Oy comamos y bebamos (late 15th century)
- Tribagia o Via Sacra de Hierusalem (1521)

== Ensemble performances of his work ==
- Date unknown - Mayrat - El Viaje del Agua. Grupo Odres.
- 1960 - Victoria de los Angeles - Spanish Songs of the Renaissance. Ars Musicae de Barcelona and Victoria de los Ángeles. Conducted by José Maria Lamaña.
- 1968 - Music from the Time of Christopher Columbus. Musica Reservata. Directed by John Beckett.
- 1970 - Pleasures of the Royal Courts. Early Music Consort of London and David Munrow.
- 1971 - El Camino de Santiago. Escolanía and Capilla Musical de la Abadía del Valle de los Caídos and Cuarteto y Grupo de Instrumentos Antiguos Renacimiento. Directed by Leoncio Diéguez, Laurentino Saenz de Buruaga, and Ramón Perales de la Cal.
- 1973 - Music from the court of Ferdinand and Isabella. Early Music Consort of London and David Munrow.
- 1974 - Old Spanish Songs. Teresa Berganza and Narciso Yepes.
- 1974 - Antik Musik på Wik - Early Music at Wik. Joculatores Upsaliensis.
- 1976 - Jewish & Christian Spain. Hespèrion XX and Jordi Savall.
- 1977 - Ars Antiqua de Paris à la Sainte Chapelle. Ars Antiqua de Paris.
- 1979 - Villancios. Atrium Musicae de Madrid. Directed by Gregorio Paniagua.
- 1980 - La Spagna. Atrium Musicae de Madrid. Directed by Gregorio Paniagua.
- 1981 - Obra Musical Completa de Juan del Enzina. Miguel Á. Tallante and Pro Mvsica Antiqva de Madrid y solistas.
- 1984 - Romeros y Peregrinos. Grupo Universitario de Cámara de Compostela. Directed by Carlos Villanueva.
- 1986 - L'homme armé: 1450-1650. Boston Camerata. Directed by Joel Cohen.
- 1987 - Music from the Spanish Kingdoms. Circa 1500.
- 1988 - Music from the time of Richard III. The Yorks Waits.
- 1988 - Musica dell'epoca di Cristoforo Colombo. I Madrigalisti di Genova. Directed by L. Gamberini.
- 1989 - El Cancionero Musical de Palacio. Ensemble Danserye.
- 1991 - Segovia Songbook. Ensemble Daedalus. Directed by Roberto Festa.
- 1991 - del Encina. Jordi Savall and Hespèrion XX.
- 1991 - Cancionero de Palacio 1475-1516. Jordi Savall and Hespèrion XX.
- 1991 - From a Spanish Palace Songbook. Margaret Philpot, Shirley Rumsey, and Christopher Wilson.
- 1991 - Chansons - Danses - Musiques. Ensemble Jehan de Channey.
- 1992 - Spain 1479-1555. La Nef and Sylvain Bergeron.
- 1992 - Music from the age of discovery. Waverly Consort and Michael Jaffee.
- 1993 - In Gottes Namen fahren wir. Cologne Ensemble for Old Music.
- 1993 - Spanish songs & motets. Gothic Voices and Christopher Page.
- 1993 - Amando e Desiando. Alice Musik Produktion.
- 1994 - Sephardic Songs. Sarband. Directed by Vladimir Ivanoff.
- 1995 - Canciones, Romances, Sonetos. La Colombina.
- 1995 - Al alva venid. La Romanesca and José Miguel Moreno.
- 1995 - Songs and dances from the Spanish Renaissance. Camerata Iberia.
- 1995 - A Royal Songbook. Musica Antiqua of London. Directed by Philip Thorby.
- 1995 - Landscapes. Bellugi Ensemble and David Bellugi.
- 1995 - A Song of David. La Rondinella.
- 1995 - Odyssey. New World Renaissance Band.
- 1995 - Music from the Mediterranean Basin (12th-16th centuries). Ensemble vocal et instrumental Arabesque. Directed by Domitille de Bienassis.
- 1996 - Cancionero Musical de Palacio. Ensemble Accentus. Directed by Thomas Wimmer.
- 1996 - Sola m'ire. Ensemble Gilles Binchois and Dominique Vellard.
- 1996 - All the King's Men. I Fagiolini, Robert Hollingworth, Concordia, Mark Levy.
- 1996 - Los Ministriles. Piffaro, The Renaissance Band, directed by Joan Kimball and Robert Wiemken.
- 1996 - Resonanzen '96. Musik aus den Habsburgerlanden.
- 1997 - A Ricolta Bubu. Bob, Frank en Zussen.
- 1998 - The two worlds of Francisco de Peñalosa. Concentus Musicus Minnesota, directed by Arthur Maud.
- 1998 - Sephardic Journey. La Rondinella.
- 1998 - De Antequara sale un moro. Ensemble Música Ficta. Directed by Carlos Serrano.
- 1998 - Cartas al Rey Moro. Begoña Olavide.
- 1998 - Música no tempo das Caravelas. Música Antiga da UFF.
- 1999 - La Música en la Corte de los Reyes Católicos y Carlos I. Capella Virelai and Jordi Reguant
- 1999 - La Folia, 1490-1701. Corelli, Marais, Martín y Coll, Ortiz, & Anónimos; Jordi Savall; Rolf Lislevand; Michael Behringer; Arianna Savall; Bruno Cocset; Pedro Estevan; and Adela Gonzalez-Campa.
- 1999 - Renaissance Spain in the Age of Empire. Ex Umbris.
- 2000 - Renaissance Song of Italy and Spain. Live Oak.
- 2000 - Diferencias. Codex Huelgas, Villancicos, Ensemble Differencias, and Conrad Steinmann.
- 2000 - Plaser y gasajo. Capella de Ministrers. Directed by Carles Magraner.
- 2000 - La Canción del Emperado. La Capella Reial de Catalunya, Hespèrion XXI, and Jordi Savall.
- 2000 - Pilgerwege. Freiburger Spielleyt.
- 2000 - Nunca fue pena mayor. Capella de Ministrers and Cor de la Generalitat Valenciana. Directed by Carles Magraner.
- 2001 - Constantinople. Kiya Tabassian and Ensemble Constantinople.
- 2001 - Cançoner del duc de Calàbria. Duos i Exercicis sobre els vuit tons and In Canto.
- 2001 - Music of Renaissance Spain. The Terra Nova Consort.
- 2001 - Bread, Wine & Song. Orlando Consort.
- 2002 - A las puertas de Granada. Begoña Olavide and Mudéjar.
- 2002 - Cancionero. The Dufay Collective.
- 2002 - Misteris de Dolor. Accentus Austria. Directed by Thomas Wimmer.
- 2002 - Hoy comamos y bebamos. Coro Justicia de Aragón and Susana Sarfson.
- 2003 - La Conquista de Granada. Música Antigua. Directed by Eduardo Paniagua.
- 2003 - El Fuego. Eduardo Notrica.
- 2004 - Isabel I, Reina de Castilla. La Capella Reial de Catalunya, Hespèrion XXI, and Jordi Savall.
- 2004 - Cancionero de Palacio. Capella de Ministrers. Directed by Carles Magraner.
- 2005 - Juana I de Castilla. Musica Antigua. Directed by Eduardo Paniagua.
- 2005 - Wine in music from the 15th and 16th Centuries. La Rossignol.
- 2006 - Christophorus Columbus. Hespèrion XXI, La Capella Reial de Catalunya, and Jordi Savall.
- 2006 - Borgia. Capella de Ministrers. Directed by Carles Magraner.
- 2006 - La Spagna. Camerata Iberia. Juan Carlos de Mulder.

=== Recordings ===
- 2021: Todos los bienes del mundo: Juan del Encina and Musical Traits in Spanish Renaissance — ContrArco Consort (Da Vinci C00526)

== Bibliography ==
- Teatro completo de Juan del Encina (Madrid, 1893), edited by F. Asenjo Barbieri.
- Cancionero musical de los siglos XV y XVI (Madrid, 1894), edited by F. Asenjo Barbieri,
- R. Mitjana, Sobre Juan del Encina, musico y poeta (Malaga, 1895).
- M. Menendez y Pelayo, Antologia de poetas liricos castellanos (Madrid, 1890–1903), Vol. VII
- Morais, Manuel (ed.), La obra musical de Juan del Encina (Salamanca: Centro de Cultura Tradicional, 1997).
- Buekholder, J. Peter, Claude V Palisca. "Norton Anthology of Western Music: volume 1" fifth edition. W. W. Norton & Company, Inc, 2006
- Gómez, Maricarmen (ed.), Historia de la Música en España e Hispanoamérica 2. De los Reyes Católicos a Felipe II (Madrid-México D.F., Fondo de Cultura Económica, 2012).
- Pastor Comín, Juan José, "La escritura musical de Juan del Encina" poetics más allá de la palabra," in F.B. Pedraza Jiménez, R. González Cañal, and E.E. Marcello (coords.) El teatro en tiempos de Isabel y Juana (1474-1517): XXXIX Jornadas de teatro clásico (Ciudad Real: Univ. de Castilla-La Mancha, 2017), pp. 159–75.
