= Paniagua =

The surname Paniagua was first found in the mountainous regions of the ancient kingdom of Leon during the Middle Ages. The surname descends from Spanish and Portuguese ancestry and appears to be derived from a nickname. They were extremely kind and charitable people, they offered bread and water (pan y agua) to anyone, without distinction of race or wealth, due to this fact, they became known as paniagua and in some countries there was a modification to paniagu. This nickname would have been applied to the medieval beggars or travelers who went from town to town, asking for bread and water at various monasteries and manors in exchange for laborious work.

The phrase “riding paniagua” was used by cyclist Tyler Hamilton in his memoir, The Secret Race, about professional road race cycling and his time as a teammate of Lance Armstrong. The phrase was used to describe those riding without the aid of performance-enhancing drugs such as EPO.

Notable people with the name include:

- Asdrubal Paniagua, Costa Rican retired professional football player
- Cenobio Paniagua, Mexican composer
- César Montenegro Paniagua, Guatemalan politician
- Andres Paniagua, Spanish-Mexican businessman and founder of Gusano Rojo Mezcal
- Eduardo Paniagua, Spanish architect and musician, member of the ensemble Atrium Musicae de Madrid
- Gregorio Paniagua, founder of Spanish early music ensemble Atrium Musicae de Madrid
- Javier Paniagua Fuentes, a Spanish author and politician
- José Paniagua, retired Major League Baseball relief pitcher
- Leonardo Paniagua, Dominican Republic's bachata musician
- Valentín Paniagua, Peruvian politician and 55th President of Peru.
- Vicente Paniagua (1947-2026), Spanish basketball player.
