= Gil Vicente =

Portuguese playwright and poet (c.1465-c.1536)

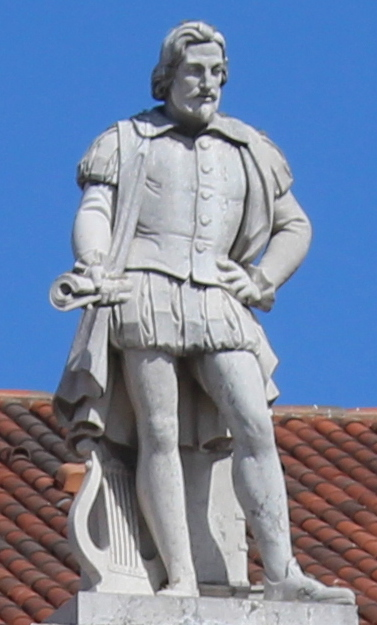
- Statue atop the pediment of D. Maria II National Theatre
- Born: c. 1465; Guimarães, Portugal
- Died: 1536 (aged 70–71) possibly Évora, Portugal
- Education: University of Salamanca (assumed)
- Occupations: Playwright, goldsmith (disputed)
- Writing career
- Subjects: Religion, satires
- Notable works: A Trilogia das Barcas, Farsa de Inês Pereira, Monólogo do Vaqueiro
- Movements: Renaissance humanism Portuguese Renaissance

Gil Vicente (Portuguese: [ˈʒil viˈsẽtɨ]; c. 1465 – c. 1536), called the Trobadour, was a Portuguese playwright and poet who acted in and directed his own plays. Considered the chief dramatist of Portugal he is sometimes called the "Portuguese Plautus," often referred to as the "Father of Portuguese drama" and as one of Western literature's greatest playwrights. Also noted as a lyric poet, Vicente worked in Spanish as much as he worked in Portuguese and is thus, with Juan del Encina, considered joint-father of Spanish drama.

Vicente was attached to the courts of the Portuguese kings Manuel I and John III. He rose to prominence as a playwright largely on account of the influence of Queen Dowager Leonor, who noticed him as he participated in court dramas and subsequently commissioned him to write his first theatrical work.

He may also have been identical to an accomplished goldsmith of the same name at the court of Évora; the goldsmith is mentioned in royal documents from 1509 to 1517 and worked for the widow of King John II, Dona Leonor. He was the creator of the famous Belém Monstrance, and master of rhetoric of King Manuel I.

His plays and poetry, written in both Portuguese and Spanish, were a reflection of the changing times during the transition from Middle Ages to Renaissance and created a balance between the former time of rigid mores and hierarchical social structure and the new society in which this order was undermined.

While many of Vicente's works were composed to celebrate religious and national festivals or to commemorate events in the life of the royal family, others draw upon popular culture to entertain, and often to critique, Portuguese society of his day.

Though some of his works were later suppressed by the Portuguese Inquisition, causing his fame to wane, he is now recognised as one of the principal figures of the Portuguese Renaissance.

== Life ==
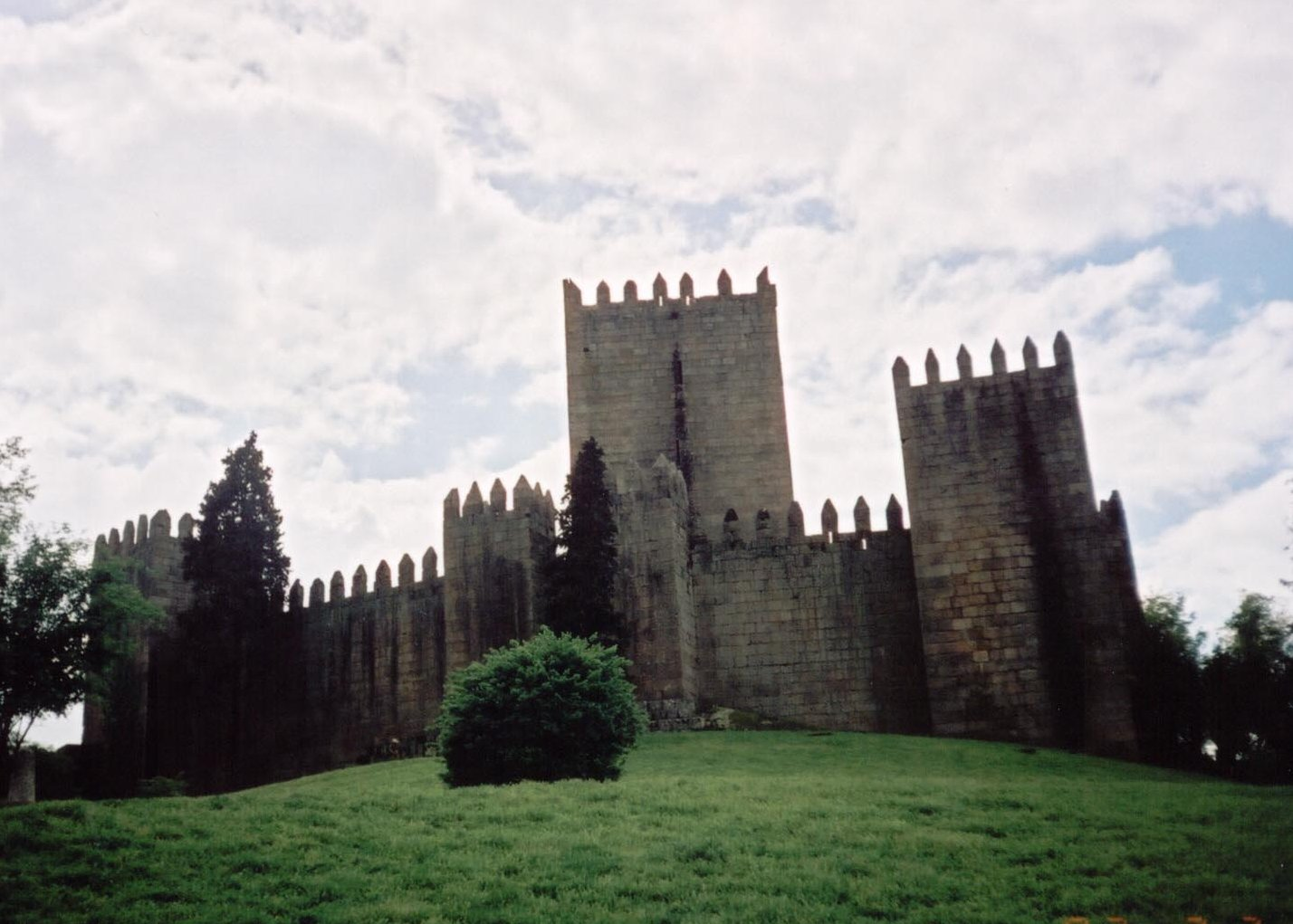
Guimarães, one of the places where it is claimed the dramatist was born

The year 1465, the date proposed by Queirós Veloso, is the commonly accepted year of Vicente's birth. However, Braamcamp Freire proposes the year 1460, while de Brito Rebelo proposes between 1470 and 1475. Vicente's own works indicate contradictory dates. The Velho da Horta ("Old Man of the [Vegetable] Garden"), the Floresta de Enganos ("Forest of Mistakes"), and the Auto da Festa ("Act of the Party") indicate 1452, 1470, and before 1467, respectively. Since 1965, when official festivities commemorating the 500th birthday of the writer were held, the date of 1465 has been almost universally accepted.

Though Frei Pedro de Poiares conjectured Barcelos was Vicente's birthplace, evidence for this is scarce. Despite this, the people of Barcelos honored the playwright by naming their own football club after him. Pires de Lima, on the other hand, proposed Guimarães, which better accounts for Vicente's identification as a jeweller. The people of Guimarães have embraced this theory; a municipal school in Urgezes is named after the playwright. There are some stories about Gil Vicente's father, that he was from this parish in Guimarães, so people believe that Gil Vicente had lived here too. Another conjecture places his birthplace at Lisbon. The Beira region is also a candidate because of various references to it in his plays, more exactly the location of Guimarães de Tavares, that has been mistaken with Guimarães.

Vicente married his first wife Branca Bezerra in 1490. The couple had two sons. Following Bezerra's death in 1514, Vicente married Melícia Rodrigues in 1517. He had three children with Rodrigues: Paula (born c. 1519), Luis (born c. 1520), and Valeria (born c. 1530). Luis organized and published a compilation of Gil Vicente's work in 1562.

It is well known the presence of the playwright in Santarém, on 26 January, during the 1531 Lisbon Earthquake, where rumors quickly spread, apparently encouraged by the friars of Santarém, that the disaster was divine punishment (Latin: "Ira Dei"- Wrath of God) and that the Jewish community was to blame. Faced with social instability in the city, Gil Vicente, reportedly, personally defused the situation while scolding the friars for their fear-mongering in a powerfully written letter to King John III, and possibly averting a massacre of Jews and recent converts to Christianity.

Vicente's last work is dated to 1536, and he was dead by 1540. The precise year of his death is unknown, and the location is variously given as Évora or Torres Vedras.

== Career ==
It is assumed that Vicente studied in Salamanca. Though he initially studied law, he soon abandoned it for literature.

=== As a writer ===
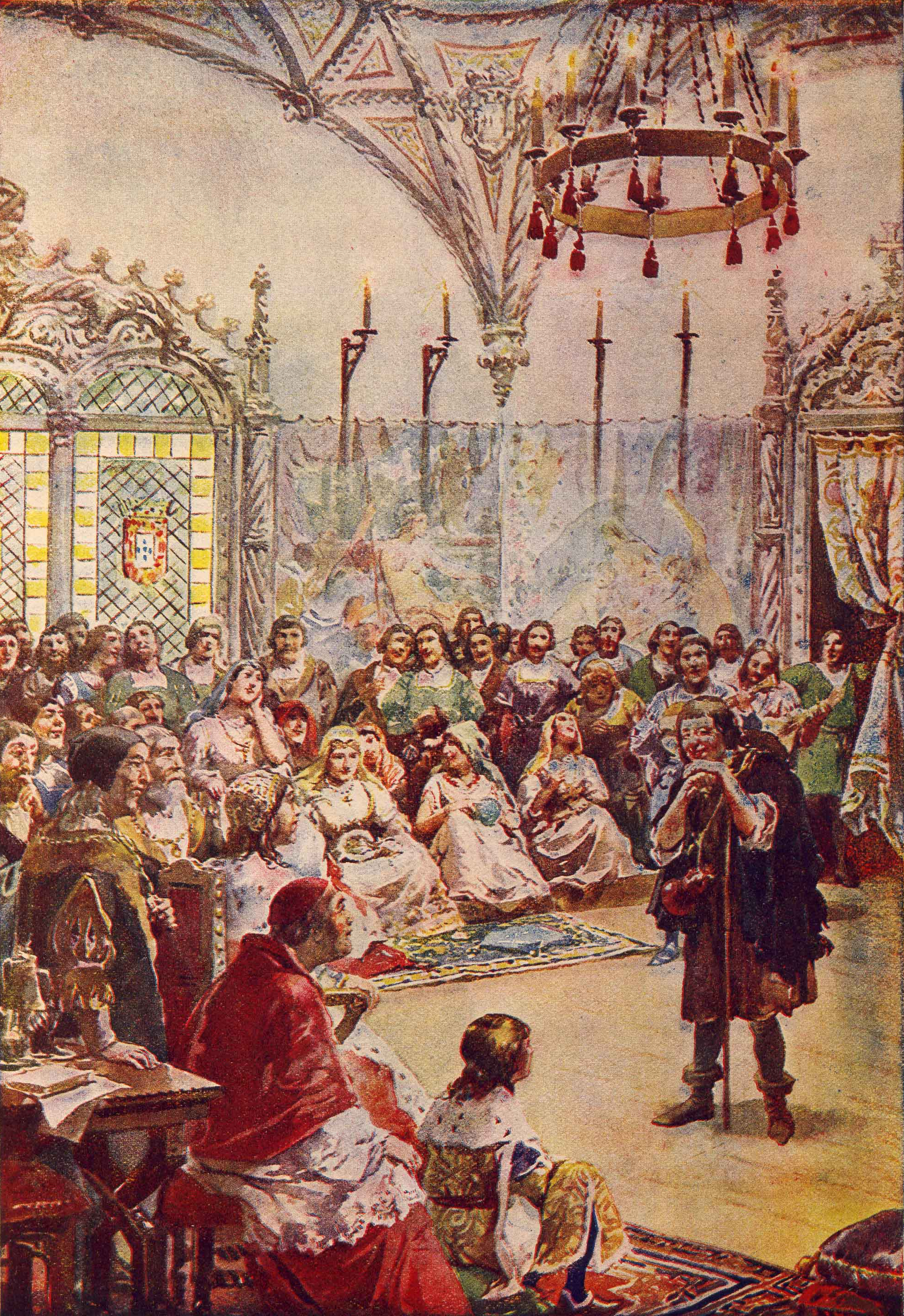
O Monólogo do vaqueiro (Monologue of the Cowherd), as it would have been performed by Gil Vicente himself, according to the vision of the painter Alfredo Roque Gameiro.

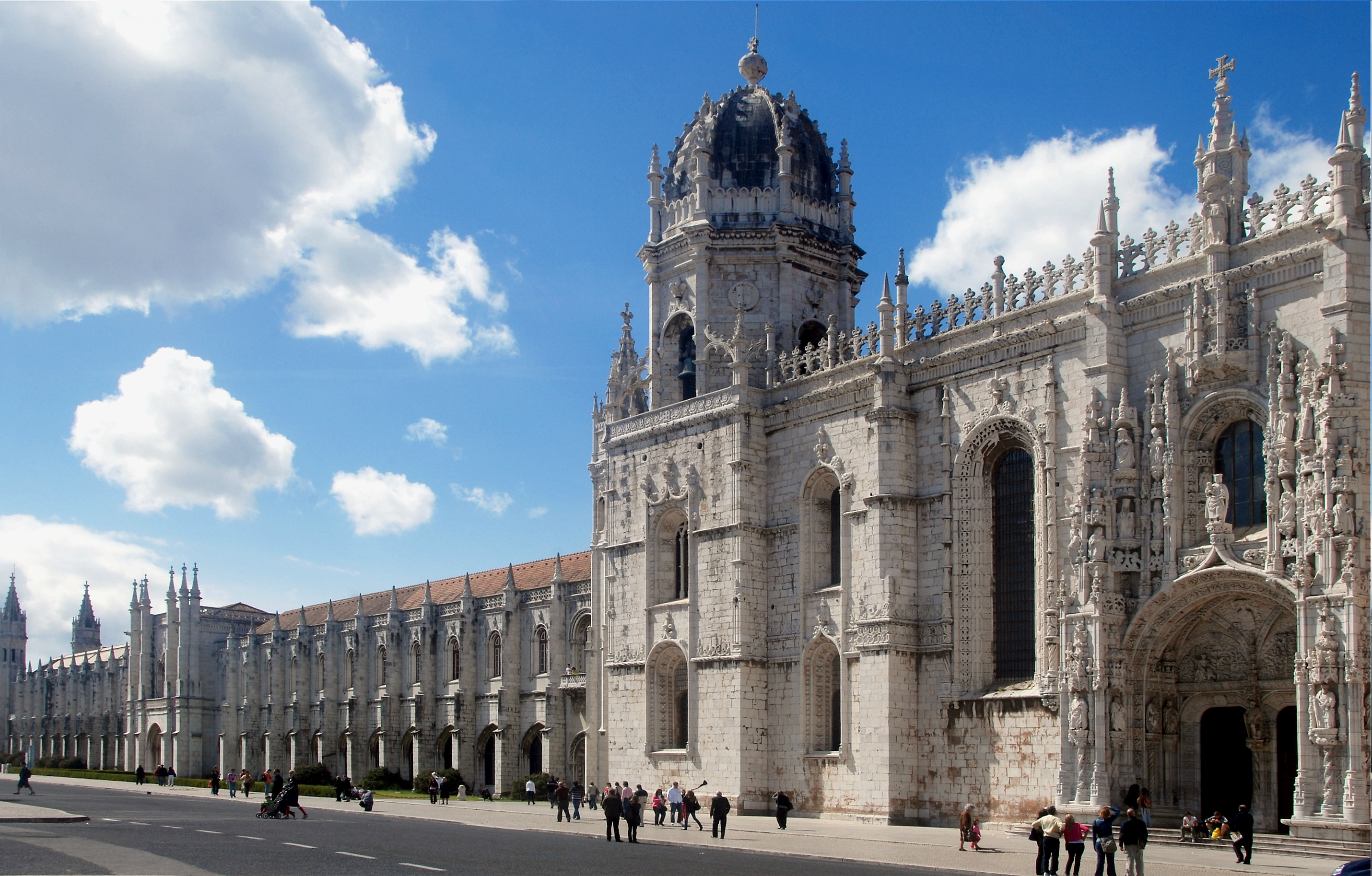
Lisbon: Jerónimos Monastery

In 1493, he was acting as master of rhetoric to the Duke of Beja, afterwards King Manuel, a post which gave him admission to the court. His first known work, O Monólogo do vaqueiro ("Monologue of the Cowherd"), was written in Spanish and acted in the rooms of Maria of Aragon, wife of King Manuel, to celebrate the birth of Prince John (later John III of Portugal). The first performance, recited by the playwright himself, took place on the night of 8 June 1502, in the presence of the king; the queen; Leonor of Viseu, former Queen of Portugal and widow of John II; and Beatriz of Portugal, mother of the King.

O Monólogo do vaqueiro contains several elements clearly inspired by the Adoration of the Shepherds which takes place in accounts of Christ's birth. Its staging included offerings of simple and rustic gifts, such as cheese, to the future king, from whom great achievements were expected.

Though Leonor asked him to give an encore performance of the play at the Christmas matins, Vicente decided to write a new play for the occasion, the Auto Pastoril Castelhano ("Castilian Pastoral Act"). The court, pleased again, required a further diversion for Twelfth Night, whereupon he produced the Auto of the Wise Kings. Because of the influence of Queen Leonor, who would become his greatest patron in the years to come, Gil Vicente realized that his talent would allow him to do much more than simply adapt his first work for similar occasions.

Vicente, who was in charge of organizing events in the palace, also directed the commemoration in honour of Eleanor of Spain, the third wife of Manuel I, in 1520. In 1521, he began serving John III of Portugal, and soon achieved the social status necessary to satirize the clergy and nobility with impunity. His popularity even enabled him to contradict the opinions of the king, as he did in a 1531 letter defending the New Christians.

For thirty years he entertained the courts, accompanying them as they moved from place to place, and providing by his autos a distraction in times of calamity, and in times of rejoicing giving expression to the feelings of the people. Though himself both actor and author, Gil Vicente had no regular company of players, but it is probable that he easily found students and court servants willing to get up a part for a small fee, especially as the plays would not ordinarily run for more than one night.

=== As a goldsmith ===
Many works about Gil Vicente associate him with a goldsmith of the same name at the court of Évora; technical terms used by the playwright lend credibility to this identification.

In 1881, Camilo Castelo Branco wrote the letter "Gil Vicente, Embargos à fantasia do Sr. Teófilo Braga" ("Gil Vicente, Refutations of the Opinion of Mr. Teófilo Braga"), which argued that Gil Vicente the writer and Gil Vicente the goldsmith were two different people. Teófilo Braga, who initially believed them to be the same man, later adopted a different opinion after reading a study by Sanches de Baena which showed the different genealogy of two individuals named Gil Vicente. However, Brito Rebelo demonstrated the historical inconsistency of these two genealogies by the use of documents from the Portuguese national archive.

Between 1503 and 1506, Vicente the goldsmith crafted the famous Belém Monstrance for the Jerónimos Monastery using gold brought back from East Africa following Vasco da Gama's second voyage to India. The monstrance features a ceremonial canopy framed by two high pinnacled counterforts, resembling the portal of the Church of Belém.

Three years later, he became overseer of the patrimonies of the Convento de Cristo in Tomar, Nossa Senhora de Belém, and the Hospital de Todos-os-Santos in Lisbon. In 1511, he was nominated vassal of the King, and a year later he was the representative jeweller in the Casa dos Vinte e Quatro. In 1513, as master of the balance of the Casa da Moeda, the Portuguese national mint, Vicente the goldsmith was elected by the others masters to represent them in Lisbon.

== Written works ==
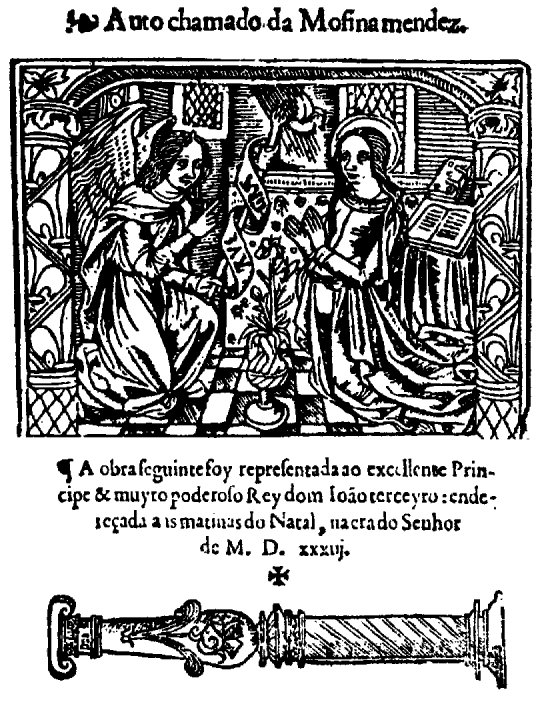
Auto de Mofina Mendes.

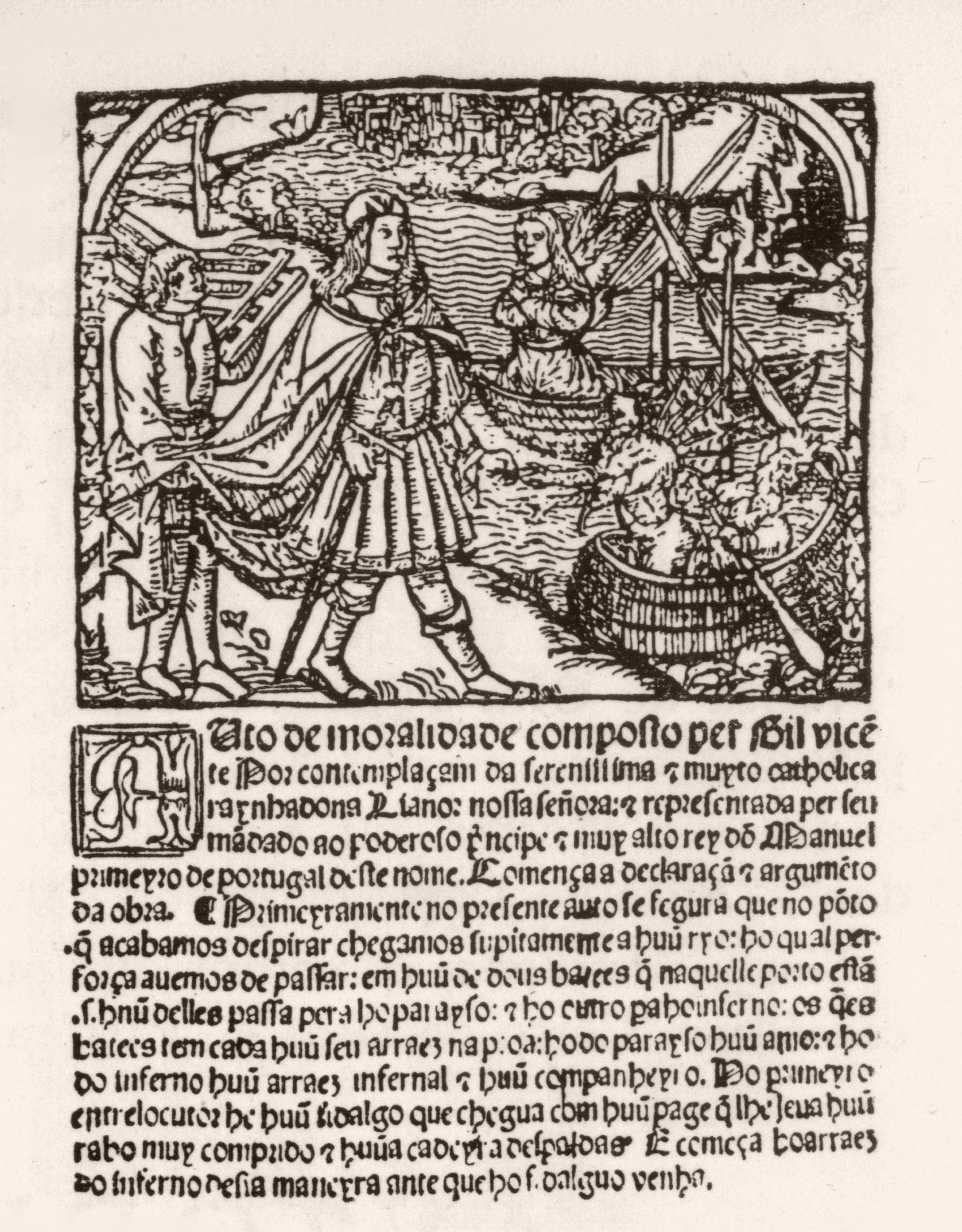
Illustration of the original edition of Auto da Barca do Inferno (Act of the Ship of Hell)

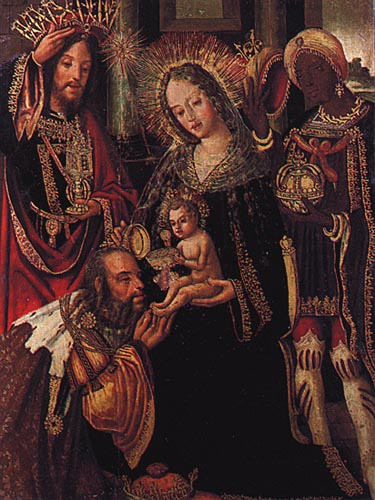
Christmas-related themes, very present in Gil Vicente's works since the first order from Queen Leonor, have also a strongly symbolic and suggestive meaning. Here, a painting from the contemporaneous Vicente Gil (not to be confused with the playwright)

Vicente's oeuvre spans the years between 1500 and 1536. Most of his plays were intended for performance at court, where he and the ladies and gentlemen of the court participated in their production. He wrote no fewer than forty-four pieces, ten of which are in Spanish, fourteen in Portuguese, and the remainder in mingled Portuguese and Spanish. His plays may be grouped into four main categories: acts, or devotional plays; comedies tragicomedies; and farces.

Like Spain's classical dramas, his plays are often in verse form. In addition, they feature his own musical compositions and well as popular lyrics and melodies of the time.

He was also a noted lyric poet in both Portuguese and Spanish, as represented by several poems in the Cancioneiro of Garcia de Resende. He wrote a number of vilancetes and cantigas ("songs") which were influenced by a palatial style and the themes of the troubadours.

Some of his works are profoundly religious, while other are particularly satirical, particularly when commenting upon what Vicente perceived as the corruption of the clergy and the superficial glory of empire which concealed the increasing poverty of Portugal's lower classes.

=== Characteristics ===
Vicente's works were partially influenced by the Iberian popular and religious theatre that was already being done. Pastoral themes present in the writings of Juan del Encina strongly influenced Vicente's early works and continued to inform his later, more sophisticated plays. The humanism of Erasmus and of Renaissance Italy also impacted his work.

Luís Vicente, his son, classified Vicente's sacred plays as acts and mysteries and his secular plays as farces, comedies, and tragicomedies. His plays may be further divided into pastoral acts, religious allegories, biblical narratives, episodical farces, and narrative acts. However, many of his works blend both secular and sacred elements; for example, Triologia das Barcas ("Trilogy of the Ships") contains both farcical and religious motifs.

Vicente is one of the most important satirical authors of the Portuguese language. His satires were severely critical, anticipating Jean-Baptiste de Santeul's later epigram (often mistakenly attributed to Horace or Molière), castigat ridendo mores ("[Comedy] criticises customs through humour"). He portrayed Portuguese society of the 16th century with perceptiveness and insight, using many characters inspired by Portuguese social stereotypes of his time. In addition, rustic characters, such as sailors, gypsies, and peasants, are common, as are more fantastical characters such as fairies and demons. Though he commonly referenced popular dialects, Vicente maintained the lyricism of his words.

Positive aspects of Vicente's works include imagination, originality, and a proficiency in technical knowledge of theatre. Though spontaneous, sardonic, and emotive, his works maintain a directness and simplicity of dialogue which is lyrical without being florid or exaggerated. He expresses himself in an unexpected, Dionysian way which does not always obey the aesthetic and artistic principles of balance. Vicente's works seem to show a spirit in conflict: his portrayals of the flaws of others appear almost rash and cruel, while his devotional and pastoral works, and those scenes in which he defends the oppressed, give an impression of tenderness, docility, and humaneness. In contrast, his works sometimes include a romanticism which combines eroticism and waggery with more erudite influences such as Petrarch.

=== Philosophical elements ===
The worlds presented in Vicente's works could be considered as representative of the duality of Platonic idealism. The first world is the abstract, an ideal place of serenity and divine love that leads to inner peace, quietness, and "resplendent glory", according to his letter to John III of Portugal. The second world, which he portrays in his farces, is the physical: a false world, tired, without order or remedy, and lacking in strength.

His satirical works depict the second world, in which human flaws are caricatured with little regard for actual or historical truth. Though critics call attention to these anachronisms and narrative inconsistencies, it's possible that Vicente considered these errors trivial in his portrayals of an already false and imperfect world. In contrast, his representations of the mythic, symbolic, and religious aspects of Christmas, such as the figure of the Virgin Mother, the infant Jesus, and Christmas Eve, demonstrate a harmony and purity which is not present in his social commentary.

Unlike plays which echo Manichaeism by presenting the dichotomy of darkness and light, Vicente's work juxtaposes the two elements in order to illustrate the necessity of both. Christmas Eve, one of his common motifs, is symbolic of his philosophical and religious views: the great darkness borders the divine glory of maternity, birth, forgiveness, serenity, and good will. The darkness is necessary to provide contrast with the light.

Though his patriotism is apparent in works such as Exortação da Guerra ("Exhortation of War") and Auto da Fama ("Act of Fame"), or Cortes de Júpiter ("Courts of Jupiter"), it doesn't merely glorify the Portuguese Empire; instead, it is critical and ethically concerned, especially with the newly available vices which arose due to commerce with the East, that brought a sudden enrichment and disruption of the social fabric.

=== Religious plays ===
Many of Vicente's plays were composed in order to celebrate religious festivals; these seventeen plays are called his "Obras de devoção" ("Devotional works"). In these plays, also called "autos", or "acts", Vicente blended themes from Medieval morality plays with theatrical mumming and the liturgical dramas that were used in Corpus Christi festivals.

One of his first devotional plays was Auto da Fé ("Act of Faith") in 1510. Like a morality play, it explores the journey of the Soul as it travels to the arms of the Mother Church. On its way, it is waylaid by the Devil and led to goodness by an Angel.

His magnum opus is considered to be the Triologia das Barcas ("Trilogy of the Ships"), which consists of the three plays Auto da Barca do Inferno ("Act of the Ship of Hell"), written 1516; Auto da Barca do Purgatório ("Act of the Ship of Purgatory"), written in 1518; and Auto da Barca da Glória ("Auto of the Ship of Heaven"), written in 1519. These plays combine morality narratives with criticism of 16th-century Portuguese society by placing stereotypical characters on a dock to await the arrival of one of the ships which will take them to their eternal destination. The characters are of a variety of social statuses; for example, in Auto da Barca do Inferno, those awaiting passage include a nobleman, a madam, a corrupt judge and prosecutor, a dissolute friar, a dishonest shoemaker, a hanged man, and a Jew (who would have been considered bound for Hell in Vicente's time).

His religious lyricism shows the influence of the Cantigas de Santa Maria ("Songs of Saint Mary") and is exemplified in such works as Auto de Mofina Mendes ("Act of Mofina Mendes", literally, in the Portuguese of that time, "Act of Disgrace [Mofina] It Self [Mendes]), Anunciação ("Annunciation"), and in the prayer of Saint Augustine in Auto da Alma ("Act of the Soul"). For this reason, Vicente is sometimes called the "Poet of the Virgin."

His other notable religious works include Auto Pastoril Castelhano ("Castilian Pastoral Act") written in 1502; Auto dos Reis Magos ("Act of the Magi Kings") written in 1503 for Christmas celebrations; and Auto da Sibila Cassandra ("Act of the Sibyl Cassandra") written in 1503, a play which announced the Renaissance ideals in Portugal.

=== Comedies and farces ===
Vicente's comedies and farces were likely influenced by indigenous popular entertainment. Contemporaneous Spaniards, like Lucas Fernandez and Torres Naharro, may also have influenced his style.

Vicente's comedies blended slapstick and satire; in addition, his use of dialect clearly delineated the social classes of his characters. The staging of these plays maintained the simplicity of morality plays. For example, two simultaneous scenes might utilize a single curtain to divide them.

Auto da Índia ("Act of India"), written in 1509, was one of his first comedies. This play, which shows his proficiency with the form, is comparable to a modern bedroom farce. Vicente wrote farces throughout the rest of his life; one notable example is Farsa de Inês Pereira ("Farce of Inês Pereira"), written in 1523.

== Influence on Portuguese theatre ==
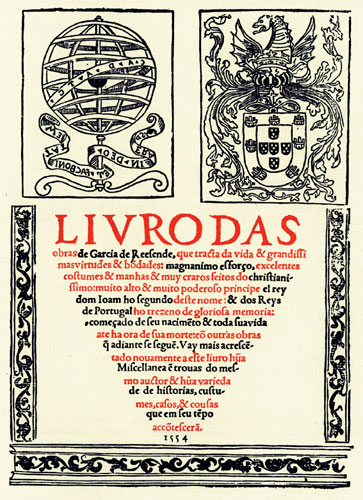
Works of Garcia de Resende. In the Miscelânia, he defends Vicente as the "Father of Portuguese theatre."

Prior to Vicente, few dramatic stagings had taken place in Portugal. However, a few notable performances had established theatrical precedence in courtly and religious contexts.

During the reign of Sancho I of Portugal (1185–1212), Bonamis and Acompaniado, the first recorded Portuguese actors, put on a show of arremedillo and were paid by the King with the donation of lands.

In a document dated 1281, Frei Telo, Archbishop of Braga, refers to liturgical dramas which were performed during Catholic festivities.

In 1451, theatrical acts accompanied the festivities of the wedding of Infanta (Princess) Eleanor of Portugal with Emperor Frederick III of Habsburg.

According to the Portuguese chronicles of Fernão Lopes, Gomes Eanes de Zurara, Rui de Pina, and Garcia Resende, spectacular stagings took place in the courts of John I of Portugal, Afonso V of Portugal, and John II of Portugal. For example, Rui de Pina refers to one instance in which King John II himself played the part of The Knight of the Swan in a production which included a scene constructed of fabric waves. During the action, a fleet of carracks with a crew of spectacularly dressed actors entered the room accompanied by the sound of minstrels, trumpets, kettledrum, and artillery.

Other significant Portuguese theatrical works include the eclogues of Bernardim Ribeiro, Cristóvão Falcão, and Sá de Miranda, and the Pranto de Santa Maria (1435), an early liturgical drama by André Dias. Garcia de Resende, in his Cancioneiro Geral, designates a few other works, such as Entremez do Anjo by D. Francisco of Portugal, Count of Vimioso, and the lays of Anrique da Mota. Vicente likely assisted in the production of these works, which include comedic scenes.

Though Vicente did not invent Portuguese theatre, his works surpassed any done before that time. His writing in Portuguese and in Spanish shaped both modern Spanish and modern Portuguese drama. His contribution to creating new forms, such as the farce, and raising the morality play to its apotheosis created the base upon which Portuguese and Spanish drama would be built. Though some of his works were later suppressed by the Inquisition, he is now recognized as one of the greatest dramatists of the Renaissance and the leading name in Portuguese theatre. According to Marcelino Menéndez Pelayo, Vicente is "the most important figure of the primitive peninsular playwrights…[There was no one] who surpassed him in Europe in his time."

== Publication and influence on other works ==
The first edition of Vicente's complete works was published in Lisbon in 1561–1562 by his children Paula and Luís. In 1586, the second edition was published; however, many parts were heavily censored by the Inquisition. The third edition was not published until 1834 in Hamburg by Barreto Feio, after which Vicente's work was finally rediscovered.

Since that time, various composers, such as Max Bruch (who made Von den Rosen komm' ich (Von dem Rosenbusch, o Mutter) from Vicente's De la rosa vengo my madre [from the rose I come my mother], which also had a version by Schumann) and Robert Schumann (who made his Spanische Liebeslieder [Spanish Love Songs] no. 7. Weh, wie zornig ist das Mädchen from Vicente's Sañosa está la nina [Irritated is the little girl] and no. 3. Lied, op. 29 no. 2 from Vicente's Canción [Song]; and two of his Spanisches Liederspiel no. 1. Erste Begegnung, op. 74 no. 1 and no. 3. Intermezzo, op. 74 no. 2), have set Vicente's poetry to music in the form of lieder. Most of these were translated into German by Emanuel van Geibel. Chilean composer Sylvia Soublette set Vicente's text to music in her song “Del Rosal Vengo.”

A quote from one of Vicente's plays, "The pursuit of love is like falconry", appears in the epigraph of Gabriel García Márquez's novel Chronicle of a Death Foretold.

== See also ==
- Auto (art)
- Portugal in the Age of Discovery
- Portuguese Empire
