= Abu al-Hasan al-Shushtari =

Andalusian Sufi poet and scholar

Abū al-Ḥasan al-S̲h̲us̲h̲tarī أبو الحسن الشُشْتَرِي
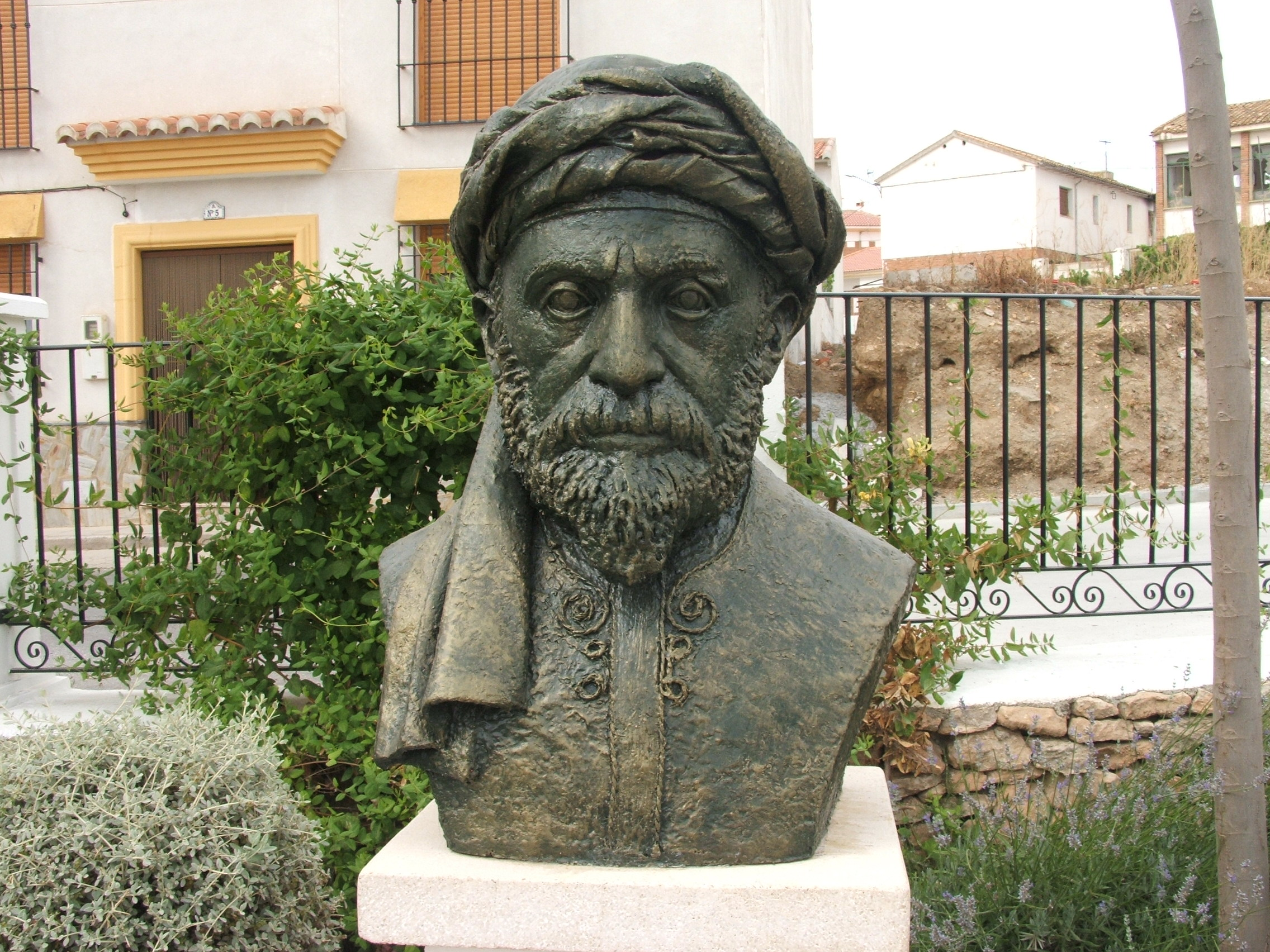

Personal life
- Born: 1203 Shushtar village near Exfiliana, Al-Andalus
- Died: October 16, 1269 (aged 65–66) plain of al-Ṭīna near Būr Saʿīd, northern Egypt
- Resting place: Dimyāṭ, Egypt (initial), Al-Moski neighbourhood, Egypt (final)
- Main interest(s): Poetry, Jurisprudence, Mysticism
- Notable idea: Shushtariyya order
- Known for: Islamic philosophy, poetry

Religious life
- Religion: Islam
- Creed: Sab'iniyya-Shushtariyya (absorbed into Shadhiliyya after his death)

Al-Shustari (Note: Full name Abū al-Ḥasan ibn ʿAbdallāh al-Numayrī al-S̲h̲us̲h̲tarī (Arabic: أبو الحسن علي بن عبد الله النُمَيْرِي الشُشْتَرِي); sometimes he is also referred to as al-Lūshī because he spent his childhood at Lūsha (Loja).) (Arabic: الشُشْتَرِي, romanized: Al-S̲h̲us̲h̲tarī; 1203–1269 CE) was an Andalusī Sufi poet, sufi mystic, and scholar known for his contributions to Islamic mysticism and religious poetry.

A disciple of Ibn Sabʿīn and influenced by Andalusī Sufis such as Abū Madyan, al-Shushtarī combined vernacular poetic forms with esoteric philosophical thought. His works, which include poetry and treatises on cosmology and metaphysics, remain significant in Sufi traditions and academic studies. Despite controversies regarding his orthodoxy, al-Shushtarī is recognized for his role in blending philosophical mysticism with accessible spiritual expression.

== Early life and background ==
Abū al-Ḥasan ‘Alī ibn ‘Abd Allāh al-Numayrī al-Shushtari was born around 1203 in Shushtar, a village near Guadix (then Wādī Āsh) in the Sierra Nevada region northeast of Granada. He was born into a prominent family belonging to the Arab tribe of Banū Numayr.

He received an aristocratic upbringing and a comprehensive education in traditional Islamic sciences, including Quranic exegesis (tafsīr), Prophetic traditions (ḥadīth), jurisprudence (fiqh), and grammar (naḥw). Al-Shushtari's exposure to Andalusī poetic forms, such as the zajal and muwashshaḥ, later informed his innovative approach to religious poetry, blending mystical themes with vernacular styles.

== Sufi journey and influences ==
Al-Shushtarī's spiritual transformation began during his travels in al-Andalus and North Africa in his thirties. These travels exposed him to the social and political turmoil of the era, which deepened his interest in Sufi teachings. Initially influenced by the traditions of Abū Madyan, he also received guidance from Ibn Surāqa al-Shāṭibī and other disciples of ʿUmar al-Suhrawardī.

Shushtarī initially studied under Ibn Surāqa of Jativa, who introduced him to Suhrawardī al-Baghdādī's ʿAwārif al-Maʿārif. During this time, he is believed to have joined the Madanīya order. Shushtarī lived briefly in Rabāṭ, Meknes, and Fes, composing a poem about his experiences in Meknes:

"A shaykh of the land of Meknes —
Goes singing through the sūq (market) —
What do men want with me? —
What do I want with them?"

A significant turning point in his mystical journey took place in 1248 CE (646 AH) when he encountered the philosopher and mystic Ibn Sabʿīn in Bijāya, whose influence left a profound impact on him.

In 1252 CE, Shushtarī met the poet Nadjīm b. Isrāʾīl in Damascus, a member of the Rifāʿīya Ḥarīrīya order. The following year, he relocated to Mecca, where he crossed paths with Ibn Sabʿīn once more. Despite being older than Ibn Sabʿīn, Shushtarī became his pupil and received the khirqa sabʿīnīya (cloak of initiation). This cloak symbolized a mystical lineage that traced its authority to figures such as Ḥallāj and Socrates, as criticized by Ibn Taymīya. Shushtarī wholeheartedly embraced Ibn Sabʿīn’s esoteric approach to Sufism, becoming his devoted disciple. This association, however, led to allegations of heterodoxy, particularly claims of ḥulūl (indwelling), which generated controversy around his teachings.

== Literary contributions ==
Al-Shushtarī is celebrated for his religious poetry, which continues to be recited in Sufi rituals and gatherings. He is credited with pioneering the use of vernacular poetic forms, such as the zajal, for religious expression. His poetry, often set to melodies, invited audiences from diverse backgrounds to contemplate themes of divine love and surrender.

His prose works include treatises on Sufi cosmology, theology, and practice, such as:

- al-Maqālīd al-Wujūdiyya fī Asrār al-Ṣūfiyya
- al-Marātib al-Īmāniyya wa’l-Islāmiyya wa’l-Iḥsāniyya
- al-Risāla al-ʿIlmiyya (summarized by Ibn Luyūn)
- al-Risāla al-Baghdādiyya

His dīwān (poetry collection) includes lyrical odes (qaṣīdas), strophic muwashshaḥāt, and azjāl. These works reflect a fusion of mystical thought and vernacular creativity and have been studied by scholars such as ʿAbd al-Ghanī al-Nābulusī and Aḥmad ibn ʿAjība.

== Mystical philosophy ==
Al-Shushtarī's metaphysical and cosmological ideas are elaborated in works such as al-Risāla al-Miʿrājiyya. This treatise explores themes of divine governance (tadbīr), the nature of time (zamān), and eschatology, drawing from Quranic concepts and the influence of Ibn Sabʿīn and Ibn al-ʿArabī. His teachings emphasized renunciation of worldly attachments and the cyclical nature of existence.

In al-Risāla al-Miʿrājiyya, al-Shushtarī discusses the concept of cyclical time through eight hierarchical levels, culminating in an eschatological interpretation of the Quranic verse yudabbiru al-amr min al-samāʾ ilā al-arḍ thumma yaʿruju ilayhi fī yawmin kāna miqdāruhu alf sanah (Q 32:5). These levels include governance, divine command, and the ascension of creation to God, reflecting a sophisticated cosmological and metaphysical vision.

== Later life and legacy ==
In his later years, al-Shushtarī's disciples increasingly identified with the Shādhiliyya Sufi order, signalling a shift in his affiliations. He travelled widely across North Africa and the Middle East, attracting followers and disseminating his teachings. Despite controversies over his association with Ibn Sabʿīn, al-Shushtarī's contributions were admired by figures such as Lisān al-Dīn ibn al-Khaṭīb and the Catalan mystic Ramon Llull.

Al-Shushtarī died in 1269 CE (668 AH) near Dimyāṭ, Egypt. His remains were later reburied in Cairo by his disciples to protect them from desecration by Crusaders. His tomb is located at Al-Moski, an old neighbourhood in Cairo named after ʿIzz al-Dīn Mūsik, the cousin of Saladin. His enduring influence is reflected in the continued recitation of his poetry within Sufi orders and the scholarly interest his works generate in both Islamic and Western contexts.

== Significance ==
Regarded as one of the foremost Sufi poets of Western Islam, al-Shushtarī occupies a significant place in the history of Islamic mysticism. His innovative use of Andalusī poetic forms to express complex spiritual themes exemplifies the integration of vernacular traditions with esoteric thought, ensuring his lasting legacy as a poet, philosopher, and mystic.

== Recordings ==
- Ritual sufí andalusí, al-Shushtari, Omar Metioui, Eduardo Paniagua, Madrid, Pneuma, 1998
- Dhikr y sama':canto religioso de la cofradía sufí-andalusí al-Shushtari. Poemas del místico al-Shushtari, Omar Metioui, Eduardo Paniagua, Madrid, Pneuma, 1998.

== Bibliography ==
- Fierro, Maribel (24 April 2012). Bearman, P.J. (ed.). "al-S̲h̲us̲h̲tarī". Encyclopaedia of Islam New Edition. Brill: 512–513. doi:10.1163/1573-3912_islam_sim_6996. ISSN 1573-3912.
- Elinson, Alexander E. (1 January 2011). "Abū al-Hasan al-Shushtarī: Songs of Love and Devotion". Journal of Arabic Literature. 42 (1). Brill: 95–97. doi:10.1163/157006411X577141. ISSN 0085-2376.
- Casewit, Yousef (12 September 2019). "The Treatise on the Ascension (Al-Risāla al-miʿrājiyya)". Light upon Light: Essays in Islamic Thought and History in Honor of Gerhard Bowering. Brill. pp. 182–238. doi:10.1163/9789004410121_009. ISBN 978-90-04-41012-1.
- Massignon, L. (2012). "S̲h̲us̲h̲tarī". Encyclopaedia of Islam First Edition. Brill. doi:10.1163/2214-871x_ei1_sim_5401.
