= Encina de San Silvestre =

- Municipality
- Flag Coat of arms

- Location in Salamanca

- Location in Spain
- Coordinates: 41°00′50″N 6°05′35″W
- Country: Spain
- Autonomous community: Castile and León
- Province: Salamanca
- Comarca: Tierra de Ledesma

Government
  - Mayor: José Luis Vicente (People's Party)

Area
  - Total: 23.76 km^{2} (9.17 sq mi)
- Elevation: 800 m (2,600 ft)

Population (2016)
  - Total: 111
  - Density: 4.67/km^{2} (12.1/sq mi)
- Time zone: UTC+1 (CET)
  - Summer (DST): UTC+2 (CEST)
- Postal code: 37114

Encina de San Silvestre is a village and municipality in the province of Salamanca, western Spain, part of the autonomous community of Castile and León. It is located 40 kilometres (25 mi) from the provincial capital city of Salamanca and has a population of 111 people.

== Geography ==
The municipality covers an area of 23.76 km^{2} (9.17 sq mi).

It lies 800 metres (2,600 ft) above sea level.

The postal code is 37114.

Spanish poet and musician Juan del Enzina was born in the village.

== See also ==
- List of municipalities in Salamanca
