= Monólogo do Vaqueiro =

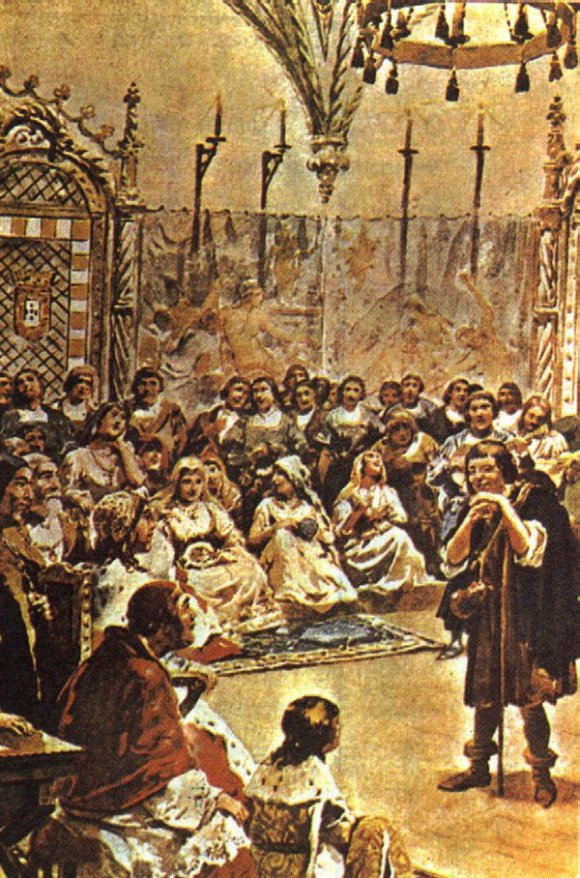
Monólogo do Vaqueiro by Alfredo Roque Gameiro.

The Monologue of the Cowboy (Portuguese: Monólogo do Vaqueiro) or Act of the Visitation (Portuguese: O Auto da Visitação) is a play by Gil Vicente. The play is named after the Vaquero, the horse-mounted livestock herder of the Iberian Peninsula.

With Spanish roots, it was Gil Vicente's first play, written for the celebration of the birth of the prince Dom João, the future king John III of Portugal. It premiered in 1502 at the royal court, then located in Castelo de São Jorge, in Lisbon.
