= Paula Vicente =

Paula Vicente (1519–1576), was a Portuguese artist, musician and writer. She was the daughter of Gil Vicente and Mecília Rodrigues and sister of Luís Vicente. She was appointed lady-in-waiting to Maria of Portugal, Duchess of Viseu, and never married. She was a known scholar and musician, and wrote several plays.

== Works ==
- Arte de Língua Inglesa e Holandesa para instrução dos seus Naturais

== Sources ==
- AMARAL, Augusto Martins Ferreira do (1976). Barretos e Outros Contendo subsídios para a genealogia descendente de Gil Vicente. [S.l.: s.n.] pp. 49–50
