= List of conservatories in Morocco =

List article

There are a dozen major music conservatories in Morocco, supported by the Ministry of Culture. Some of the larger of these institutions use French names in international correspondence.

- Conservatoire National de Musique, de Danse, et d'Art Dramatique, Rabat - The National Institute for Music and Dance, Rabat (المعهد الوطني للموسيقى و الرقص بالرباط) is the most prestigious of the conservatories, established in 1944, and today has around 2000 students enrolled.
- The Domestic Music Institute in Rabat (المعهد الموسيقي دار مولاي رشيد بالرباط), established 1928, at Dar Moulay Rachid Sidi Fateh, with 100 students.
- Conservatory of Salé (المعهد الموسيقي بسلا), Salé established 1995, with around 1000 students.
- Conservatory of Kenitra (المعهد الموسيقي بالقنيطرة), Kenitra established 1968, with 300 students.
- Music Institute (المعهد الموسيقي بفاس), Fez established 1940, 400 students.

- Conservatory House Adeel (المعهد الموسيقي دار عديل فاس) Fez, 2001, 100 students.
- Conservatory of Casablanca (المعهد الموسيقي بالدار البيضاء), Casablanca, 1973, 200 students.
- Conservatory of Tetuan (المعهد الموسيقي بتطوان), Tétouan, 1945, 500 students enrolled.
- Conservatory of Tangier (المعهد الموسيقي بطنجة), Tangier, established 1962, 10 Rue Mahatma Gandhi, 450 students, specialising in Andalusi music and with the Orchestra of Tangier. Alumni include the singer Mohammed El-Arabi Serghini.
- Conservatory of Larache (المعهد الموسيقي بالعرائش) Larache, 1972, 300 students.
- Conservatory of Chefchaouen (المعهد الموسيقي بشفشاون) Chefchaouen, 1976, 200 students.
- Conservatory of the Grand Palace (المعهد الموسيقي بالقصر الكبير) founded 1972, 300 students.
- Conservatory of Marrakech (المعهد الموسيقي بمراكش), Marrakesh. 1948, 500 students.
- Conservatory of Meknes (المعهد الموسيقي بمكناس), Meknes, 1966, 350 students.
- Conservatory of Agadir (المعهد الموسيقي بأكادير), Agadir, 1972, about 650 students.
- Conservatory of Taza (المعهد الموسيقي بتازة), Fez, 1972, 250 students
- Conservatory of Oujda (المعهد الموسيقي بوجدة), Oujda, 1992 100 students
- Conservatory of Safi (المعهد الموسيقي بأسفي), Qishla 4, Shawki Street Safi, 1968, 200 students
- Conservatory of Jerada (المعهد الموسيقي بجرادة), Jerada 2002, 80 students
- Conservatory of Temara (المعهد الموسيقي بتمارة) Temara, 500 students
- Conservatory of Sidi Qasim (المعهد الموسيقي بسيدي قاسم) Sidi Qasim, 2004, 150
- Conservatory of Essaouira (المعهد الموسيقي بالصويرة) Essaouira, 100 students
- Conservatory Beni Mellal (المعهد الموسيقي ببني ملال) Beni Mellal, 1989, 250 students
- Conservatory of Tiznit (المعهد الموسيقي بتيزنيت) Agadir. 100 students
- Conservatory of Khemisset (المعهد الموسيقي بالخميسات) Khemisset, 1985, 350 students
- Conservatory of Demnat (المعهد الموسيقي بدمنات) Rabat 1999, 70 students
- Conservatory of Abi J'Aad (المعهد الموسيقي بأبي الجعد) Abi J'Aad, 2010
