= A Trilogia das Barcas =

Medieval play by Gil Vicente

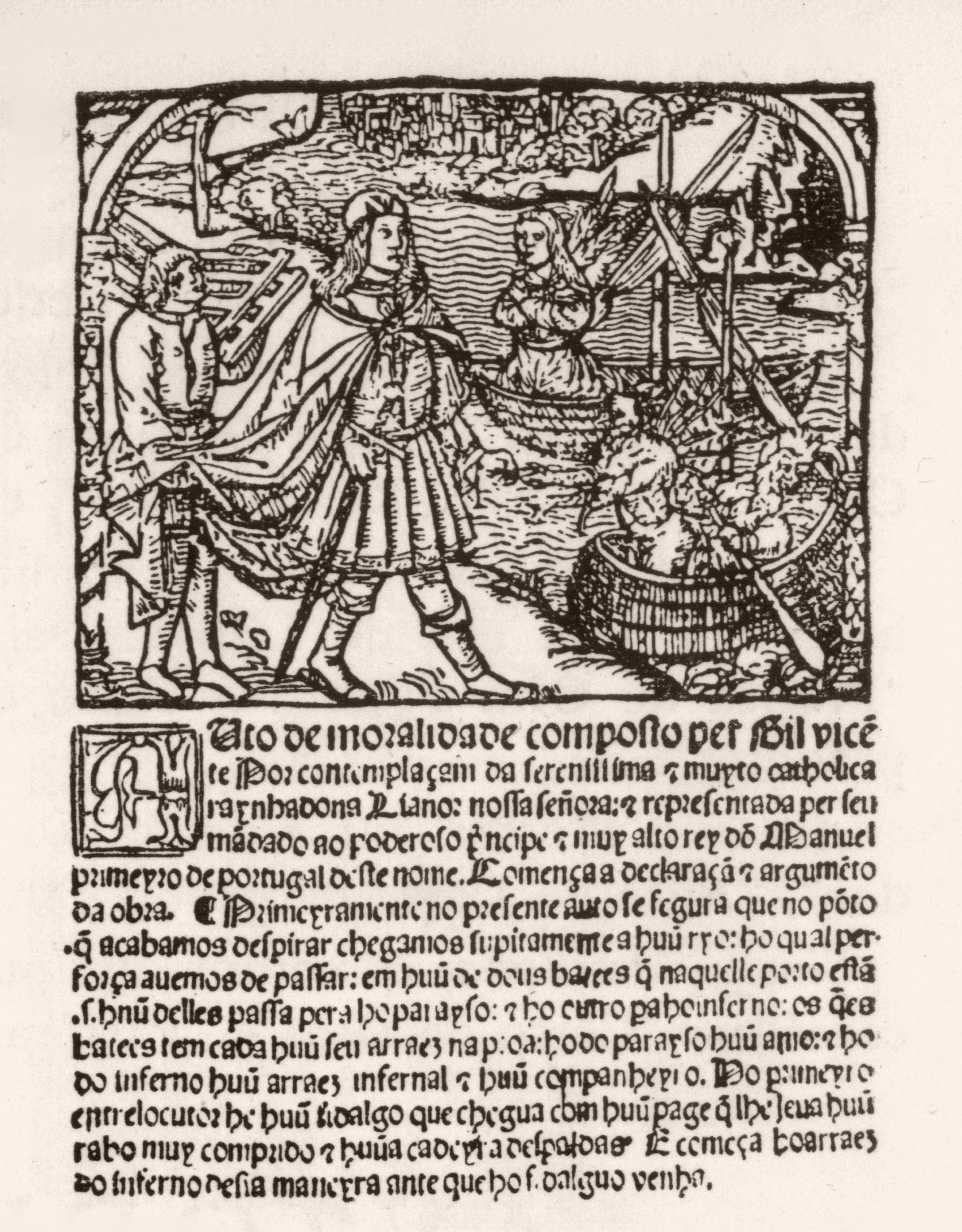
Frontispiece of the Auto da Moralidade, or Gil Vicente's "Auto da Barca do Inferno"

A Trilogia das Barcas (English: The Trilogy of the Barges or The Trilogy of Ships) is a series of one-act dramatic plays with allegorical characters by Portuguese playwright and poet Gil Vicente. Specialists classify them as morality plays even though they resemble more closely farces. They give a glimpse of the Lisboan society in the early 16th century.

== Act of the Ship of Hell ==
The Act of the Ship of Hell, also known as Act of Morality (Auto da Barca do Inferno or "Auto da Moralidade", in Portuguese) is an allegorical play by Gil Vicente premiered in 1517. It is the first part of the Trilogy of the Ships. Despite the fact there are two ferries in the play, it's called "of the Ship of Hell" because this is the destination of most of its characters after the judgement around which it is centered.

=== Characters ===
- The Angel, ferryman of the Ship of Heaven.
- The Devil, ferryman of the Ship of Hell.
- The Nobleman Sir Henry (Portuguese: Dom Henrique), who wears a cloak and brings along a squire carrying a heavy finely decorated chair (symbols of oppression, tyranny and pride).
- The Usurer, who carries a bag of coins to symbolize his greed and attachment to money.
- John Anthony (Portuguese: João Antão) the Shoemaker, a wealthy craftsman. He wears an apron and carries shoe molds, which symbolize the bourgeoisie exploitation.
- John (Portuguese: Joane), a fool who didn't give his own actions much thought. He doesn't bear any symbol, for he has done nothing in life by malice. He represents ingenuity and naïveté.
- The Friar and his mistress, Florença. He carries a sword, a shield, a helmet and a habit and also brings along his mistress. These elements are symbols of the clergy's involvement in worldly affairs.
- Madam Brísida Vaz, a procuress. Her baggage includes chests of spells and fake hymens, a cabinet, stolen goods, jewelry, a wardrobe, a wheeled house, a bed with dais and cushions and young girls. These elements represent exploitation of others and her means to and profits from it.
- Semifará, a usurer Jew. He brings along his goat - a symbol of rejection of the Christian faith and attachment to Judaism.
- The Corregidor and an Attorney, high functionaries in government. They bring with them books, paperwork and a stick.
- The Hanged Man, with the rope still around his neck representing his life of crimes and corruption.
- Four Knights who died fighting for the Christian faith. They bear the cross as symbol of their Catholic faith, being the only characters in the play whose symbol doesn't represent a sin but virtue.

The first two characters are allegorical and biblical in origin, while the others are stereotypical representations of social classes and professions. Their traits and demeanor show their lives and sins.

=== Plot ===
The play takes place in an imaginary port where two ferries await for their passengers. Each character argues with the Devil and the Angel about which ship they deserve to board. There is a pattern in which every character heads first to the Ship of Hell (which is more richly decorated), realizes that this boat goes to Hell and then goes to the Ship of Heaven. The characters that are not admitted in this boat, return to the Ship of Hell.

At the end only the four knights board the Ship of Heaven. All the other characters go to hell. To the Jew who refuses to give up his earthly possessions - a goat - is denied entrance even on the Ship of Hell (a rope is thrown to him and he is dragged in the water). The fool remains in the port, what is meant to say that he is a common and humble man but still has sins to atone. He helps the angel to judge the other characters and acts like a second voice to the author. His fate is not shown.

Three kinds of humour are present on the play:

- humour from the character's demeanor, specially the Fool's.
- situational humour (for instance, when the nobleman is mocked and humbled by the devil).
- linguistic (several of the devil's lines are comic).

There are several allusions to the mythological Charon. For instance, the usurer claims to not have money to pay the ferryman's fee.

== Act of the Ship of Purgatory ==
The Act of the Ship of Purgatory (Auto da Barca do Purgatorio, in Portuguese) is an allegorical play written in 1518 by Gil Vicente. It is the second part of the Trilogy of the Ships.

=== Characters ===
The play presents characters and characters with a more uniform social status than the previous "Ship play": The Angel. The Devil. The Devil's companion. Three minor angels. A ploughman, who carries a plow on his back, exploited by all and whose labors and sacrifices prevent his condemnation; Marta Gil, a saleswoman who practiced small faults; A shepherd who, though a believer, yielded to temptation; A shepherdess, who also will have to atone some minor faults. A young boy. A gambler.

=== Plot ===
All the deceased want to embark on the Angel's ship. These people are condemned to expiate their sins in Purgatory. In the end, only the boy boards the Ship of Heaven and only the gambler goes to hell. The others remain in purgatory.

== Act of the Ship of Heaven ==
The Act of the Ship of Heaven (Auto da Barca da Glória, in Portuguese) is an allegorical play written in 1519 by Gil Vicente. It is the third and final part of the Trilogy of the Ships.

=== Characters and plot ===
The characters of the play are the Devil, Death and several religious and secular authorities: a count, a duke, a king, an emperor, a bishop, an archbishop and, finally, the pope. In this order, they are all condemned to the Ship of Hell for their lives of sin and oppression of the poor.

== See also ==
- Auto (art)
- Portugal in the Age of Discovery
- Portuguese Empire
