= Belém Monstrance =

16th-century Portuguese work of art

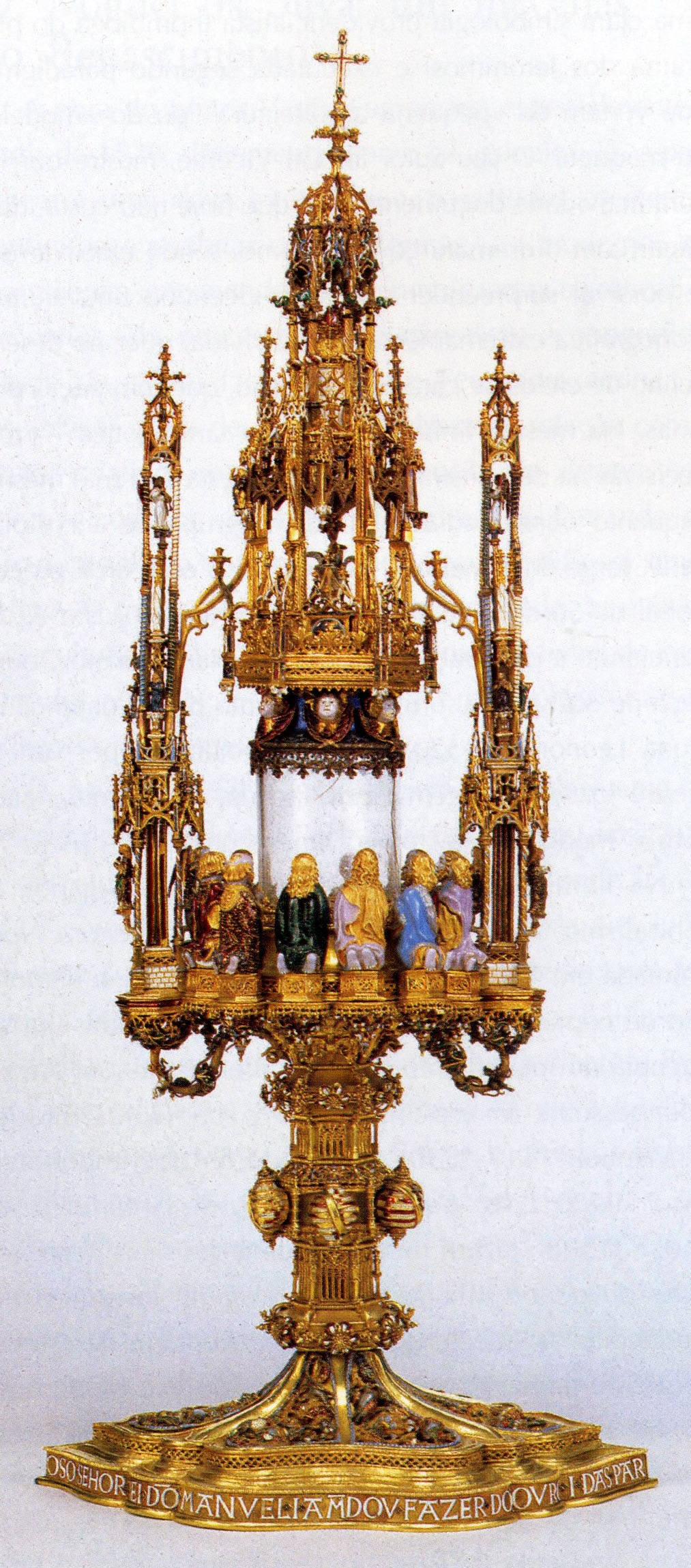
The Belém Monstrance

The Belém Monstrance (Portuguese: Custódia de Belém) is a significant monstrance made of gold and polychrome enamels. It is probably the most famous work by a Portuguese goldsmith, and is much-admired for its historical importance and artistic merit. It is dated 1506 and attributed to the Portuguese goldsmith and playwright Gil Vicente, on a commission by King Manuel I for the Royal Chapel, and later left in the King's will to the Jerónimos Monastery in Belém, at the time an outskirt of Lisbon, whence it derives its name.

It is currently part of the collection of the National Museum of Ancient Art, in Lisbon.

Crafted in late Gothic style, it was fashioned of "1,500 mithqals of gold" brought from Vasco da Gama's second trip to India in 1502 as a tribute from the petty king (régulo) of Kilwa (in present-day Tanzania), a sign of vassalage to the crown of Portugal.

The base is inscribed:

O. MVITO. ALTO. PRICIPE. E. PODEROSO. SEHOR. REI. DÕ. MANVEL. I. A. MDOV. FAZER. DO OVRO. I. DAS. PARIAS. DE. QILVA. AQVABOV. E. CCCCCVI.
("The Most High Prince and Powerful Lord, King Dom Manuel I, ordered this to be made from the gold of the tributes from Kilwa. It was completed in 1506.")
