= A little sheikh from the land of Meknes =

Poem by the Sufi poet Al-Shushtari (1212–1269)

A little sheikh from the land of Meknes (Arabic شويخ من أرض مكناس) is a zajal by the Sufi poet Al-Shushtari (1212–1269). The poem is often taken as evidence that Al-Shushtari himself lived in Meknes at some time.

== Lyrics ==
The lyrics begin: "A little shaykh from the land of Meknes in the middle of the markets singing

I don't intervene in people matters, and people don't intervene in mine.

What I care, my friend about the whole creation? just do good and you'll be saved, and follow the people of the hidden truth and don't say a word, oh my son unless it is sincere. Take my words and write them down as an amulet from me.

I don't intervene in people matters, and people don't intervene in mine.

This speech is clear and needs no explanation No one intervene in matters of the other Understand this advice Look at how old I am, with my walking stick and my sack That's how I lived in Fes and that's how I am here

My God I beg you By your generosity to accept my repentance, for the sake of the prophet and all honored people you loved. The accursed one has tempted me, and I am struggling with him, he filled my heart with scruples of his desires for me.

I don't intervene in people matters, and people don't intervene in mine.

A little shaykh from the land of Meknes in the middle of the markets singing

I don't intervene in people matters, and people don't intervene in mine.

What do I care, my friend about the whole creation? just do good and you'll be saved, and follow the people of the hidden truth and don't say a word, oh my son unless it is sincere. Take my words and write them down as an amulet from me.

I don't intervene in people matters, and people don't intervene in mine.

I don't intervene in people matters, and people don't intervene in mine.

I don't intervene in people matters, and people don't intervene in mine.

== Versions ==
- Ahmed Al-Jumairi, Bahrain
- Mona Amarsha & Adel Mahmoud
