= Mohammed El-Arabi Serghini =

Moroccan classical singer and musician

Mohamed El-Arabi Serghini (Arabic: محمد العربي السرغيني) is a Moroccan classical singer and musician. He has performed with Aouatif Bouamar, with Eduardo Paniagua, Said Belcadi and Omar Metioui. He trained at the Tangier Conservatory (المعهد الموسيقي بطنجة), and sings with the Tangier Orchestra (اوركسترا طنجة).

== Selected discography ==
- Almuedano - Mohammed Berraq, El Arabi Serghini, Azzedine al Badri, Muhamad Zugir, Hassan Ajyar, Said Belcadi. Pneuma CD
- La Felicidad Cumplida El Arabi Serghini, 2006
- La Bellezza Contemplada - Musica Andalusí de Laúd Larbí Akrim, El Arabí Serghini
