= Salim Fergani =

Algerian oud player and singer

- Born: January 1, 1953 (age 73)
- Citizenship: Algeria
- Occupation: Singer

Salim Fergani
- Born: January 1, 1953 (age 73)
- Citizenship: Algeria
- Occupation: Singer

Cheikh Salim Fergani (Arabic الشيخ سليم فرقاني) (born 1953 in Constantine, Algeria) is an Algerian oud player and ma'luf singer.

== Career ==
He is a notable performer of ma'luf music, and has recorded various CDs for the Pneuma label of Eduardo Paniagua. He is the son of the Algerian musician Mohamed Tahar Fergani.
