= Lucas Fernández (musician) =

Spanish dramatist and musician (died 1542)

Lucas Fernández (c. 1474 – 1542) was a Spanish dramatist, musician, and writer. He wrote in the Leonese language.

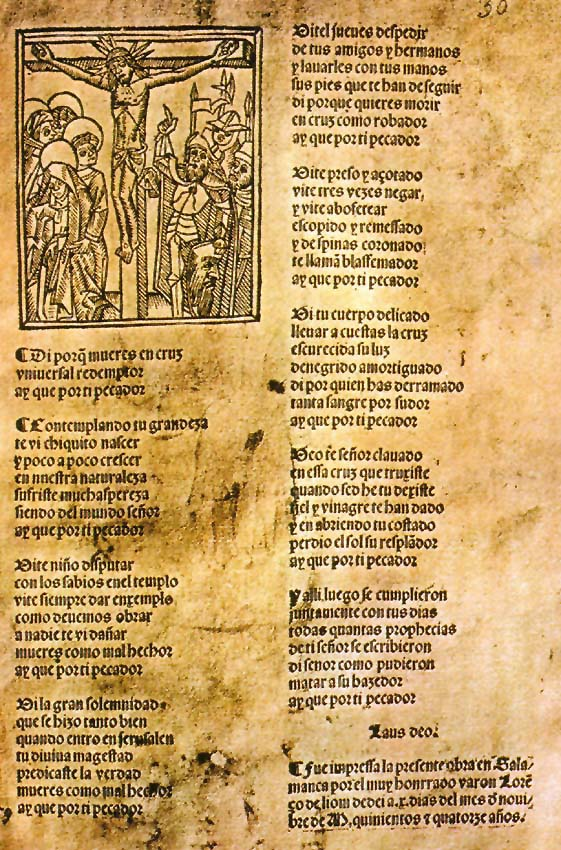
A page from his Farsas y Églogas

== Biography ==
Son of Alfonso de Cantalapiedra and María Sánchez, he was born and educated at Salamanca.

In 1498, he became cantor of Salamanca Cathedral, defeating candidate Juan del Encina. In 1520 he was the priest of Santo Tomás Cantuariense. He was professor of music in the University of Salamanca (1522) and appeared in 1533 in the commission of reform of the statutes of the same.

== Works ==
The surviving work of Lucas Fernández consists of six plays. Although showing the influence of his rival Juan del Encina, they are notable for their dialogue, humor, and the effective interleaving of song and music with the action of play. The best of the works is an Easter play Auto de la Pasión, while his Dialogo para cantar is an early example of the zarzuela.

Lucas Fernández wrote with a great influence of Leonese language, like na (feminine for "in the"), nel (masculine for "in the"), dexay (let), diz (says), quier (wants), sal (goes out), and many others.

== Editions ==
- Françoise Maurizi, ed. Lucas Fernández: Farsas y Églogas. Boydell & Brewer, 2015.
