= Omar Metioui =

Moroccan classical musician

Omar Metioui عمر المتيوي
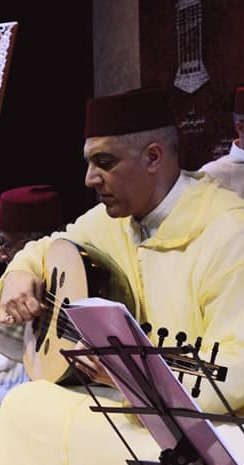

Background information
- Born: 1962; Tangier
- Instrument: oud
- Member of: Ibn Báya Ensemble

Omar Metioui (Arabic: عمر المتيوي) (born 1962) is a Moroccan classical musician.

Metioui was born in Tangier and originally trained as a pharmacist, then concentrated on performance of the oud (Arabic: عود ʿūd), or Arabic lute, as well as performance as a vocalist. He has recorded with his own Ensemble Omar Metioui, and is cofounder in 1994 with Spanish musicologist, flautist and architect Eduardo Paniagua of the group Ibn Báya Ensemble, dedicated to the recovery of medieval Andalusian music. He also founded the group Al Ála Al-Andalusiyya ( الالـــة الانــدلـســيــة ) for performance of Andalusi nubah (نوبة أندلسيّة) and Arabo-Andalusian music.

== Selected discography ==
- PN 150 Al Andalus – Al ala Al-Andalusiya Metioui
- PN 200 Al Andalus – Misticismo - Musica Sufi Andalusi Metioui
- PN 250 Al Andalus – Núba Al-Istihlal Metioui (was Sony)
- PN 360 Al Andalus – Ibn 'Arabi: El intérprete de los deseos (Arabic lyrics) Ens Ibn Bàya
- PN 430 Al Andalus – La Fuente del Amor Secreto El Laúd en la Música Andalusí Metioui
- PN 530 Al Andalus – ritual Sufi-Andalusi Al-Shushtarí (1212–1269) Metioui (Sony)
- PN 630 Al Andalus – Nuba Al-Maya (Arabic lyrics) Metioui
- PN 640 Al Andalus – Nuba rasd d-dayl. Cantos de la Noche (Arabic lyrics) Sony Metioui
- PN 650 Al Andalus – Sufies de Al-Andalus Metioui
- PN --- Al Andalus – Canto Andalusí Ibn Sahl de Sevilla 1212-1251 Metioui (Sony not yet rereleased PN)
