= Atrium Musicae de Madrid =

Atrium Musicae was an early music ensemble from Madrid, Spain, founded in 1964 by Gregorio Paniagua, a Spanish composer.

== Background ==
Perhaps the group's most famous recording is Musique de la Grèce Antique (Music of Ancient Greece), in which they performed ancient Greek music carefully taken from scattered extant fragments of papyrus. Performing the ancient compositions also meant they had to reconstruct an arsenal of ancient instruments. This ancient music was an important aspect of the group's live performances during a series of acclaimed international tours. Another well-known recording by the group is their 1976 disc Musique Arabo-Andalouse, which delves into the Hispanic-Muslim music of southern Spain and is credited with creating new interest in the genre. From the late 1970s to the early 1980s the group made a series of recordings dealing with 15th and 16th century popular Spanish songs, then shifted their attention to the New World for the album Las Indias de España, a recording of Pre-Columbian music collected from archives.

The group dissolved in the early 1980s. Several members, including Eduardo Paniagua, began solo careers.

== Major members ==
- Luis Paniagua
- Carlos Paniagua
- Eduardo Paniagua
- Gregorio Paniagua
- Beatriz Amo
- Cristina Ubeda
- Jesús Greus

== Other members ==
- Begoña Olavide
- Pablo Cano (musician)
- Máximo Pradera
- Andreas Prittwitz

Javier Bergia

Marga Aroca

Sofia Lopez-Ibor

Clara Teran

== Major recordings ==
- MISSA DE BARCELONA-ARS NOVA S.XIV-y MUSICA PROFANA [LP]
  - Edigsa AHMC 10-57 (Barcelona, Spain), Harmonia Mundi HMU 10.033 (France)
  - Recorded: Madrid (Spain), 1971
- MÚSICA IUCUNDA (SIGLOS XII AL XVII) [LP]
  - Hispavox HHS 10-459 (Spain), Erato STU 71098 (France), Melodiya C 10-09899/09900 (USSR)
  - Recorded: Madrid (Spain), 1976
- MUSIQUE ARABO ANDALOUSE [LP]
  - Harmonia mundi HM 389-04 (France)
  - Recorded: Carcasonne (France), 1976
- TARANTULE-TARANTELLE [LP]
  - Harmonia mundi HM 379 (France)
  - Recorded: Carcasonne (France), 1976
- DIEGO ORTIZ RECERCADAS [LPx2]
  - Harmonia mundi HM2393 (France), Victor VIC 2399-0 (Japan)
  - Recorded: Madrid (Spain) & Provence (France), 1977
- MUSIQUE DE LA GRECE ANTIQUE [LP]
  - Harmonia mundi HM 1015 (France), Victor VIC-28067 (Japan)
  - Recorded: Provence (France), 1978
- THIBAUT DE NAVARRE [LP]
  - Victor VIC-28137 (Japan)
  - Recorded: 1978
- VILLANCICOS [LP]
  - Harmonia mundi HM 1025 (France), Victor VIC-28086 (Japan)
  - Recorded: Forcalquier (France), 1979
- LA SPAGNA -XV-XVI-XVII Centuries [LPx2, CD]
  - BIS LP 163/164 (Sweden)
  - Recorded: Madrid (Spain), 1980
- LAS INDIAS DE ESPAÑA MÚSICA PRECOLOMBINA DE ARCHIVOS DEL VIEJO Y NUEVO MUNDO [LP]
  - Hispavox S90.463 (Spain)
  - Recorded: Madrid (Spain), 1981
- LA FOLIA- DE LA SPAGNA [LP]
  - Harmonia mundi HM 1050 (France), Victor VIC-28079 (Japan)
  - Recorded: Provenza (France), 1982
