= Eduardo Paniagua =

Spanish musician and architect (born 1952)

Eduardo Paniagua (born 1952 in Madrid, Spain) is a Spanish architect and musician, specializing in medieval Spanish music.

Between 1966 and 1983, he was a member of the group Atrium Musicae de Madrid, led by his older brother Gregorio, playing wind instruments and percussion. More recently he has been a founding member of the groups Cálamus and Hoquetus which specialize in the music of Al-Andalus (Arabic Andalusia).

In 1994, he created the group Música Antigua to perform and record the Cantigas de Santa Maria. In the same year he also founded the group Ibn Báya Ensemble together with the oud player Omar Metioui, for the performance and recording of Andalusian music. Other regular collaborators include Moroccan singers Said Belcadi, Mohammed El-Arabi Serghini, and the Algerian oud player Salim Fergani.

Paniagua also founded and currently manages the record label Pneuma through which he has published a number of his own recordings. Some of the recordings are reissues of earlier Sony Hispánica recordings, or compilations from other Pneuma recordings.

== Discography ==
With Atrium Musicæ de Madrid: (dir. Gregorio Paniagua):

- La Folía (Harmonia Mundi)
- La Spagna (BIS)
- Musique de la Grèce Antique (Harmonia Mundi)
- Antología de Música Antigua Española

With Música Antigua:

- PN 010 Cantigas de Toledo (was Sony Hispánica 62264)
- PN 020 Cantigas de Castilla y León (was Sony Hispánica 62265)
- PN 210 Cantigas de Castilla-La Mancha
- PN 220 Cantigas – Santa Maria del Puerto vol. I
- PN 240 Cantigas – Remedios Curativos (was Sony "Hispánica" 62263)
- PN 280 Cantigas de Madrid : Virgen de Atocha
- PN 340 Cantigas de Animales – Bestiario
- PN 400 Cantigas de Flauta y Tamboril
- PN 420 Cantigas de Extremadura
- PN 490 Cantigas – Caballeros (was Sony "Hispánica" 63018)
- PN 510 Cantigas de Italia (was Sony "Hispánica" 60843)
- PN 520 Cantigas de Francia (was Sony "Hispánica" 60842)
- PN 540 Morada del Corazón: Sefarad en al-Andalus, siglos XI–XII (2003)
- PN 570 Cantigas de Jerez (was Sony "Hispánica" 60080)
- PN 590 Cantigas de Sevilla (2 CDs) (was Sony "Hispánica" 62859)
- PN 610 Cantigas – La Vida de Maria (2CD)
- PN 660 La Conquista de Granada - Isabel la Católica
- PN 680 Cantigas – El Camino de Santiago en las Cantigas de Alfonso X el Sabio
  - PN 700 Rosa de las rosas (compilation)
  - PN 720 Llena de gracia (compilation)
  - PN 730 Santa María, estrela del día (compilation)
- PN 740 Cantigas de Viola de Rueda
  - Obras Maestras de las Cantigas (compilation)
- PN 820 Cantigas celtas - Merlin
- PN 860 Cantigas de Valencia
- PN 880 Cantigas de Bizancio (2CD)
- PN 980 Cantigas de Catalunya, 2008
- PN 990 Cantigas de Inglaterra, 2008
- PN1080 Cantigas de Burgos, 2009
- PN1090 Cantigas de Alemania, 2009
- PN1150 Cantigas de Flandes, 2010
- PN1170 Cantigas Del Mar Cantábrico 2010
- PN1230 Cantigas de Mujeres 2011
- PN1280 Cantigas de Nuestro Señor 2011
- PN1380 Cantigas Centenales 2013
- PN1490 Cantigas de Roma 2014
- PN1510 Cantigas de Alejandría 2015
- PN1530 Cantigas de Ultramar 2CD 2016
- PN1540 Cantigas de Jerusalen 2017
- PN1560 Cantigas de Murcia 2017

With Ensemble Ibn Baya:

- Jardín de Al-Andalus
- Walladah (Córdoba 994-1077) and Ibn Zaygun (Córdoba 1003-1071)
- La Llamada de Al-Andalus
- Núba Al-Maya
- Ibn Arabi
- El Agua de la Alhambra
- La Felicidad Cumplida
- Nuba Al-Istihlal
- Poemas de la Alhambra
- Alarifes Mudéjares

With Ensemble Cálamus:

- The Splendour of Al-Andalus
- Medieval Women's songs

Various ensembles:

- Danzas medievales españolas
- Tres culturas: judios, moros y cristianos en la España medieval
- Luz de la Mediterranía
- Sepharad
- Música Européa del siglo XV para el Organo de papel de Leonardo da Vinci
- Ecos del Espíritu. Melodías Gregorianas
- El Cantar de la Conquista de Almería

== Books ==
- PN770 Rumi-Ibn Arabí (libro-disco Almuzara) (Rumi, Ibn Arabi)
- PN960 Rabindranath Tagore (libro-disco Almuzara) (Rabindranath Tagore)
- PN1030 Ibn Gabirol. Caballero de la Palabra (libro-disco Almuzara) (Ibn Gabirol)
